= St Fethlimidh's Cathedral, Kilmore =

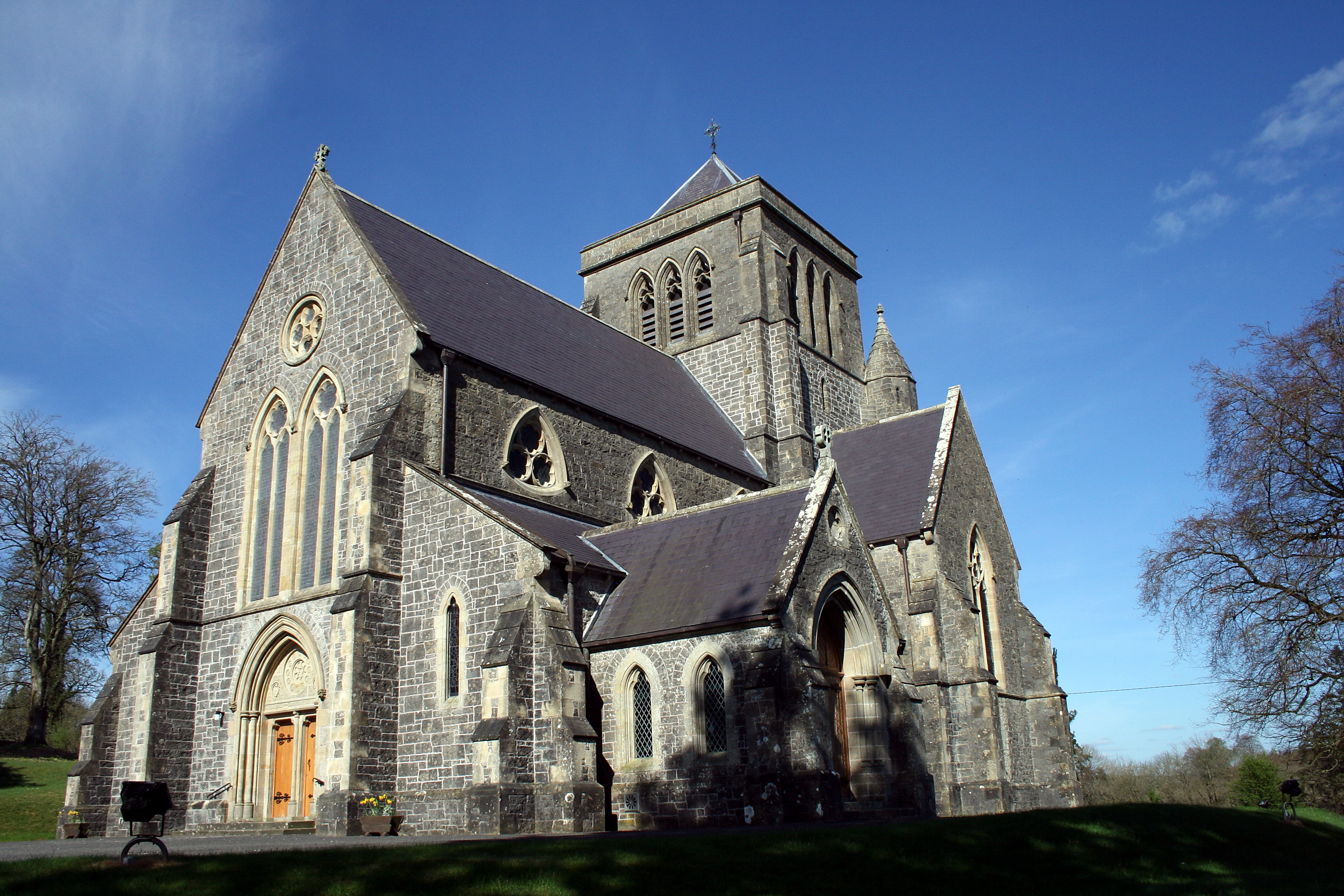
- St Fethlimidh's Cathedral, Kilmore
- St Fethlimidh's Cathedral, Kilmore
- 53°58′47″N 7°24′53″W
- Location: Kilmore, County Cavan
- Country: Ireland
- Denomination: Church of Ireland
- Previous denomination: Roman Catholic
- Website: Kilmore Cathedral

History
- Founded: 1452
- Founder: St Fethlimidh

Architecture
- Completed: 1860

Administration
- Province: Province of Armagh
- Diocese: Diocese of Kilmore, Elphin and Ardagh

Clergy
- Bishop: The Right Reverend Ferran Glenfield
- Dean: The Very Reverend Nigel Crossey

St Fethlimidh's Cathedral, Kilmore, is one of two cathedral churches in the Diocese of Kilmore, Elphin and Ardagh (along with St John the Baptist Cathedral, Sligo) in the Church of Ireland. It is in the parish of Kilmore, southwest of the county town of Cavan. The name Kilmore – Cill Mhor meaning 'the great church' – reflects an earlier prominence that the Annals of the Four Masters have traced to an early medieval foundation. Of that church there are no physical remains

== Design ==
Kilmore Cathedral stands on an elevated wooded site adjacent to an imposing motte and bailie, erected by Walter de Lacy in 1211 in an effort to extend Hiberno-Norman control over the entire Lough Oughter region. The present cathedral features a late Twelfth century Romanesque doorway (c1170), incongruously set into a chancel north wall, employed as a vestry door. Its origins are unclear, as it had previously been inserted into the nave wall of the earlier cathedral since the circa 18th century (which later became a parish hall). The Hiberno-style of Romanesque doorway probably was taken from the now demolished Drumlane St. Mary Augustinian priory. However, some local conjecture suggest that the doorway may have come from the nearby Trinity Island priory church (c.1250). The cathedral also possesses an original first edition copy of the first translation of the Old Testament into Classical Irish by William Bedell, Bishop of Kilmore from 1629 to 1642.

== History ==
According to local tradition, St. Feidhlimidh founded a small church on the site in the 6th century.

In 1455 the old Catholic Parish Church of St. Feidhlimidh became the cathedral for the Kilmore Diocese, continuing after the Reformation as Kilmore Church of Ireland cathedral, even after the Kilmore See was amalgamated in 1841 with those of Elphin and Ardagh. However, by 1858 the building was too small and dilapidated and the present cathedral, designed by William Slater, was built by 1860 alongside the old one, which is now used as a parochial hall.

The present building was refurbished at a cost of 1 million euros. The historic 1860 organ, one of the earliest organs built by Charles Brindley of Sheffield was restored in 2011.

== See also ==
- Dean of Kilmore
- Cavan Cathedral in the Roman Catholic Diocese of Kilmore
- List of Cathedrals in Ireland
