= Bishop of Limerick and Killaloe =

Bishop in the Church of Ireland

The Bishop of Limerick, Killaloe and Ardfert or the Bishop of Limerick and Killaloe (/ˌkɪləˈluː/ kil-ə-LOO; Full title: Bishop of Limerick, Ardfert, Aghadoe, Killaloe, Kilfenora, Clonfert, Kilmacduagh and Emly) is the Church of Ireland Ordinary of the united Diocese of Limerick and Killaloe in the Province of Dublin. Since 2022, the bishop has been Michael Burrows.

== Cathedrals ==
The united bishopric has three cathedrals:

- St Mary's Cathedral, Limerick
- St Flannan's Cathedral, Killaloe
- St Brendan's Cathedral, Clonfert

Five others are in ruins or no longer exist:

- St Brendan's Cathedral, Ardfert was destroyed by fire in 1641
- St Alibeus' Cathedral, Emly was demolished in 1877
- Kilmacduagh cathedral, which is partly in ruins
- Aghadoe Cathedral, which is partly in ruins
- Kilfenora Cathedral, which is partly in ruins, dates from the 12th century.

== Archdeacons ==
For administrative purposes the diocese is divided into two Archdeaconries. As of 2023, Simon Lumby was the Archdeacon of Limerick, Ardfert and Aghadoe and John Godfrey was the Archdeacon of Tuam and Killaloe.

== List of bishops ==
Bishops of Limerick and Killaloe
From	Until	Incumbent	Notes
1976	1981	Edwin Owen	Formerly Bishop of Killaloe and Clonfert; elected Bishop of Limerick and Killaloe on 21 September 1976; enthroned 5 December 1976; retired on 6 January 1981; died 2 April 2005.
1981	1985	Walton Empey	Born 26 October 1934; elected 14 January 1981; consecrated 25 March 1981; translated to Meath and Kildare in 1985, and subsequently to Dublin in 1996.
1985	2000	Edward Darling	Born 24 July 1933; consecrated at Christ Church Cathedral, Dublin on 30 November 1985; retired on 31 July 2000.
2000	2008	Michael Mayes	Born 1941; translated from Kilmore, Elphin and Ardagh; elected 8 September 2000; retired 31 March 2008.
2008	2014	Trevor Williams	Elected 6 May 2008; consecrated at Christ Church Cathedral, Dublin on 11 July 2008. Retired in July 2014.
2015	2021	Kenneth Kearon	Elected 8 September 2014; consecrated 24 January 2015; retired 31 October 2021
2022		Michael Burrows	Elected 14 January 2022

== Episcopal combination history ==
Bishop of Limerick and Killaloe (Bishop of Limerick, Ardfert, Aghadoe, Killaloe, Kilfenora, Clonfert, Kilmacduagh and Emly)	Bishop of Limerick, Ardfert and Aghadoe	Bishop of Limerick	
Bishop of Limerick and Killaloe (Bishop of Limerick, Ardfert, Aghadoe, Killaloe, Kilfenora, Clonfert, Kilmacduagh and Emly)	Bishop of Limerick, Ardfert and Aghadoe	Bishop of Ardfert and Aghadoe (also called Bishop of Kerry or Bishop of Iar Mumhan)	
Bishop of Limerick and Killaloe (Bishop of Limerick, Ardfert, Aghadoe, Killaloe, Kilfenora, Clonfert, Kilmacduagh and Emly)	Bishop of Killaloe and Clonfert (Bishop of Killaloe and Kilfenora with Clonfert and Kilmacduagh)	Bishop of Killaloe and Kilfenora	Bishop of Killaloe (already united with Roscrea)
Bishop of Limerick and Killaloe (Bishop of Limerick, Ardfert, Aghadoe, Killaloe, Kilfenora, Clonfert, Kilmacduagh and Emly)	Bishop of Killaloe and Clonfert (Bishop of Killaloe and Kilfenora with Clonfert and Kilmacduagh)	Bishop of Killaloe and Kilfenora	Bishop of Kilfenora
Bishop of Limerick and Killaloe (Bishop of Limerick, Ardfert, Aghadoe, Killaloe, Kilfenora, Clonfert, Kilmacduagh and Emly)	Bishop of Killaloe and Clonfert (Bishop of Killaloe and Kilfenora with Clonfert and Kilmacduagh)	Bishop of Clonfert and Kilmacduagh	Bishop of Clonfert
Bishop of Limerick and Killaloe (Bishop of Limerick, Ardfert, Aghadoe, Killaloe, Kilfenora, Clonfert, Kilmacduagh and Emly)	Bishop of Killaloe and Clonfert (Bishop of Killaloe and Kilfenora with Clonfert and Kilmacduagh)	Bishop of Clonfert and Kilmacduagh	Bishop of Kilmacduagh
Bishop of Limerick and Killaloe (Bishop of Limerick, Ardfert, Aghadoe, Killaloe, Kilfenora, Clonfert, Kilmacduagh and Emly)	plus the See of Emly, via first Cashel (& Emly) and then Cashel & Waterford		

== See also ==
- List of Anglican diocesan bishops in Britain and Ireland
- List of Anglican dioceses in the United Kingdom and Ireland
