= Diocese of Limerick and Killaloe =

Anglican diocese of the Church of Ireland

United Dioceses of Limerick, Ardfert, Aghadoe, Killaloe, Kilfenora, Clonfert, Kilmacduagh and Emly
- Coat of arms

Location
- Ecclesiastical province: Dublin and Cashel

Information
- Cathedral: St Mary's Cathedral, Limerick, Killaloe Cathedral, Clonfert Cathedral

Website
- limerick.anglican.org

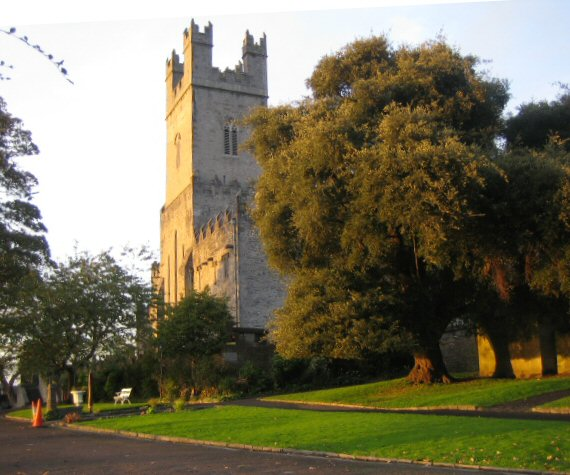
St Mary's Cathedral, Limerick

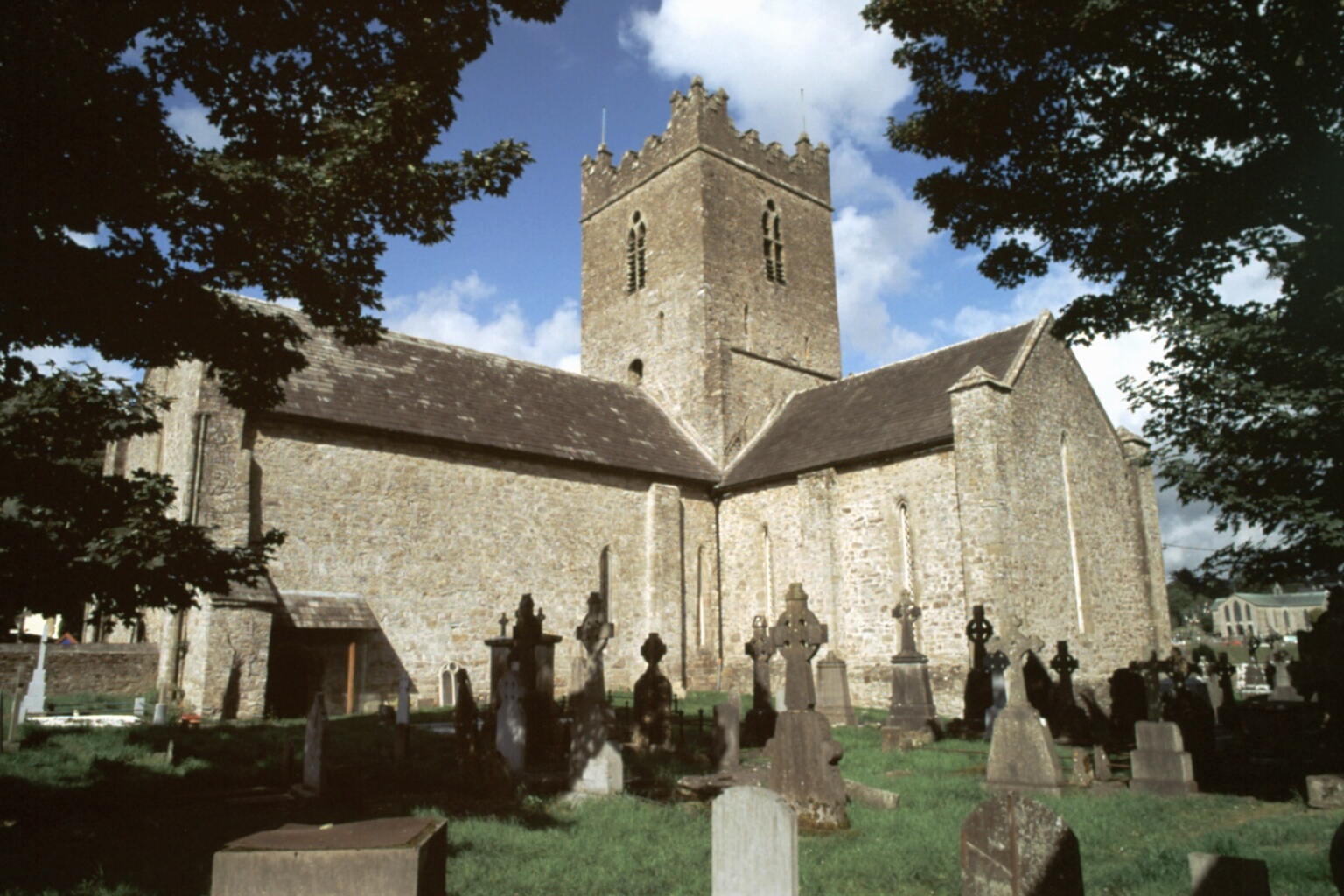
St Flannan's Cathedral, Killaloe

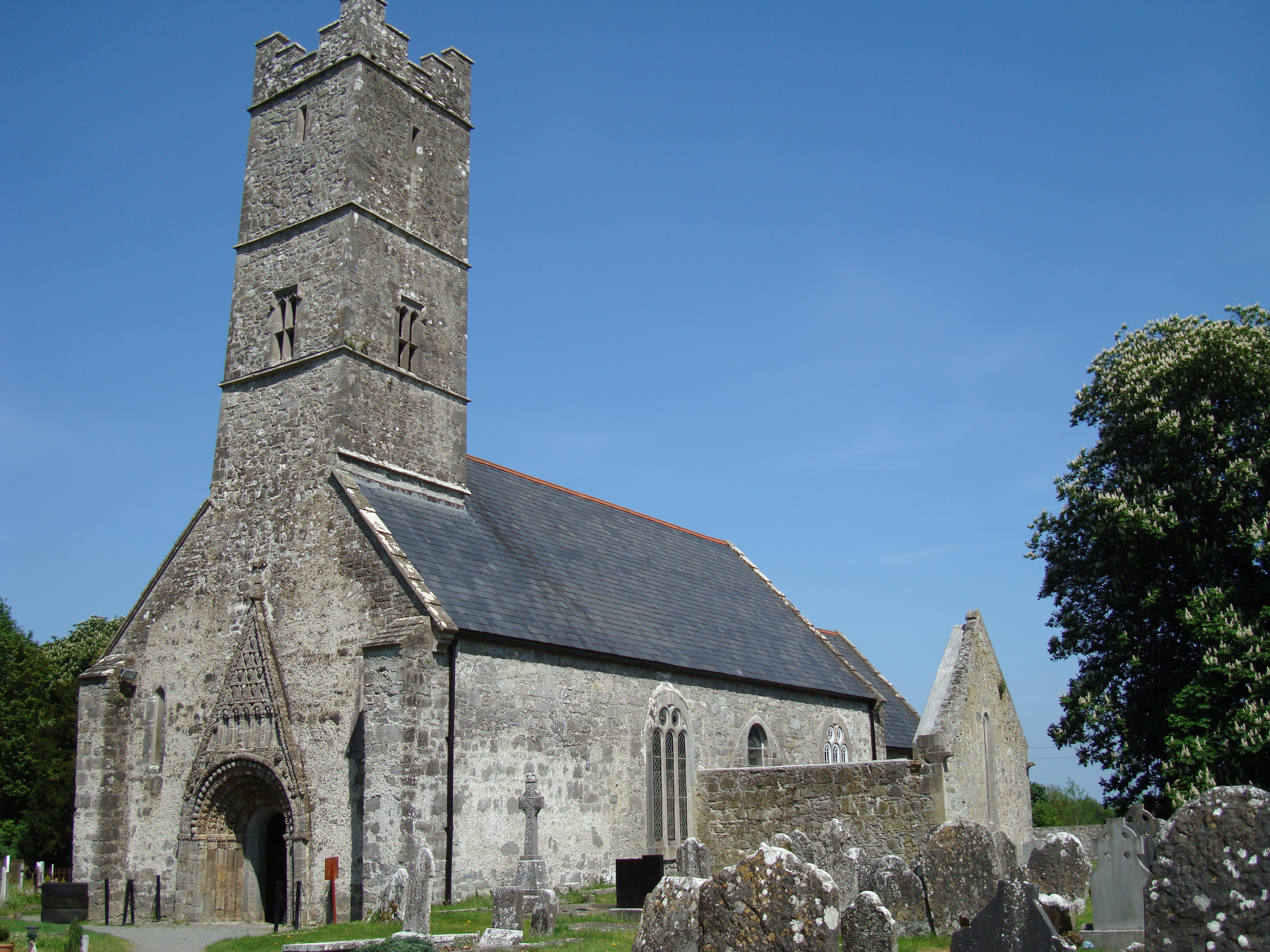
St Brendan's Cathedral, Clonfert

The Diocese of Limerick and Killaloe (formally: 'The United Dioceses of Limerick, Ardfert, Aghadoe, Killaloe, Kilfenora, Clonfert, Kilmacduagh and Emly') was a former diocese of the Church of Ireland that was located in mid-western Ireland. The diocese was formed by a merger of neighbouring dioceses in 1976, before itself merging with the neighbouring Diocese of Tuam in 2022 to form the Diocese of Tuam, Limerick and Killaloe.

The diocese was in the ecclesiastical province of Dublin and was one of the twelve Church of Ireland dioceses that cover the whole of Ireland. The diocese covered all of counties Limerick, Kerry and Clare, plus parts of counties Galway, Cork and Tipperary.

== Overview and history ==
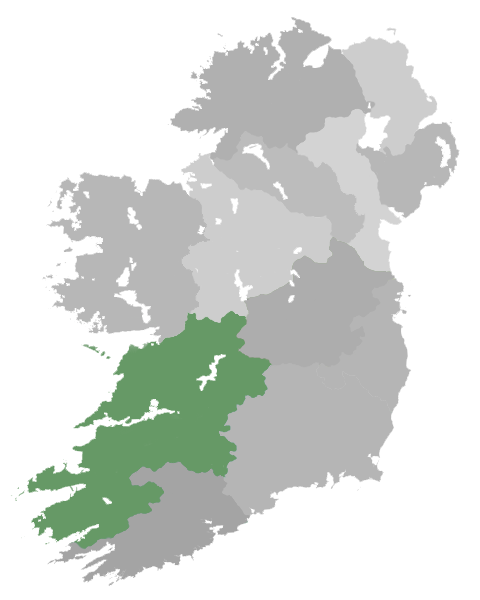
Diocese Highlighted

After the Church of England and the Roman Catholic Church broke communion, by decree of the Irish Parliament, the Church of Ireland became the independent State Church of the Kingdom of Ireland. It assumed possession of most Church property (and so retained a great repository of religious architecture and other items, though some were later destroyed). The substantial majority of the population remained faithful to Roman Catholicism, despite the political and economic advantages of membership in the state church. The English-speaking minority mostly adhered to the Church of Ireland or to Presbyterianism. Since the formation of the Church of Ireland, it has experienced a continual process of merger of dioceses (see below), in view of declining membership. For this reason, the diocese had three cathedrals.

=== Predecessor dioceses ===
Prior to its own merger, the diocese was itself the result of a number of mergers of sees beginning in the seventeenth century:

Ancient dioceses	Unions before 1976		1976
Diocese of Ardfert & Aghadoe	1661: Diocese of Limerick, Ardfert and Aghadoe		Diocese of Limerick & Killaloe
Diocese of Limerick	1661: Diocese of Limerick, Ardfert and Aghadoe		Diocese of Limerick & Killaloe
Diocese of Clonfert	1602: Diocese of Clonfert & Kilmacduagh	1834: Diocese of Killaloe & Clonfert	Diocese of Limerick & Killaloe
Diocese of Kilmacduagh	1602: Diocese of Clonfert & Kilmacduagh	1834: Diocese of Killaloe & Clonfert	Diocese of Limerick & Killaloe
Diocese of Kilfenora	1752: Diocese of Killaloe & Kilfenora	1834: Diocese of Killaloe & Clonfert	Diocese of Limerick & Killaloe
Diocese of Killaloe	1752: Diocese of Killaloe & Kilfenora	1834: Diocese of Killaloe & Clonfert	Diocese of Limerick & Killaloe
Diocese of Emly	United to Cashel from 1569-1976		Diocese of Limerick & Killaloe

== Cathedrals ==
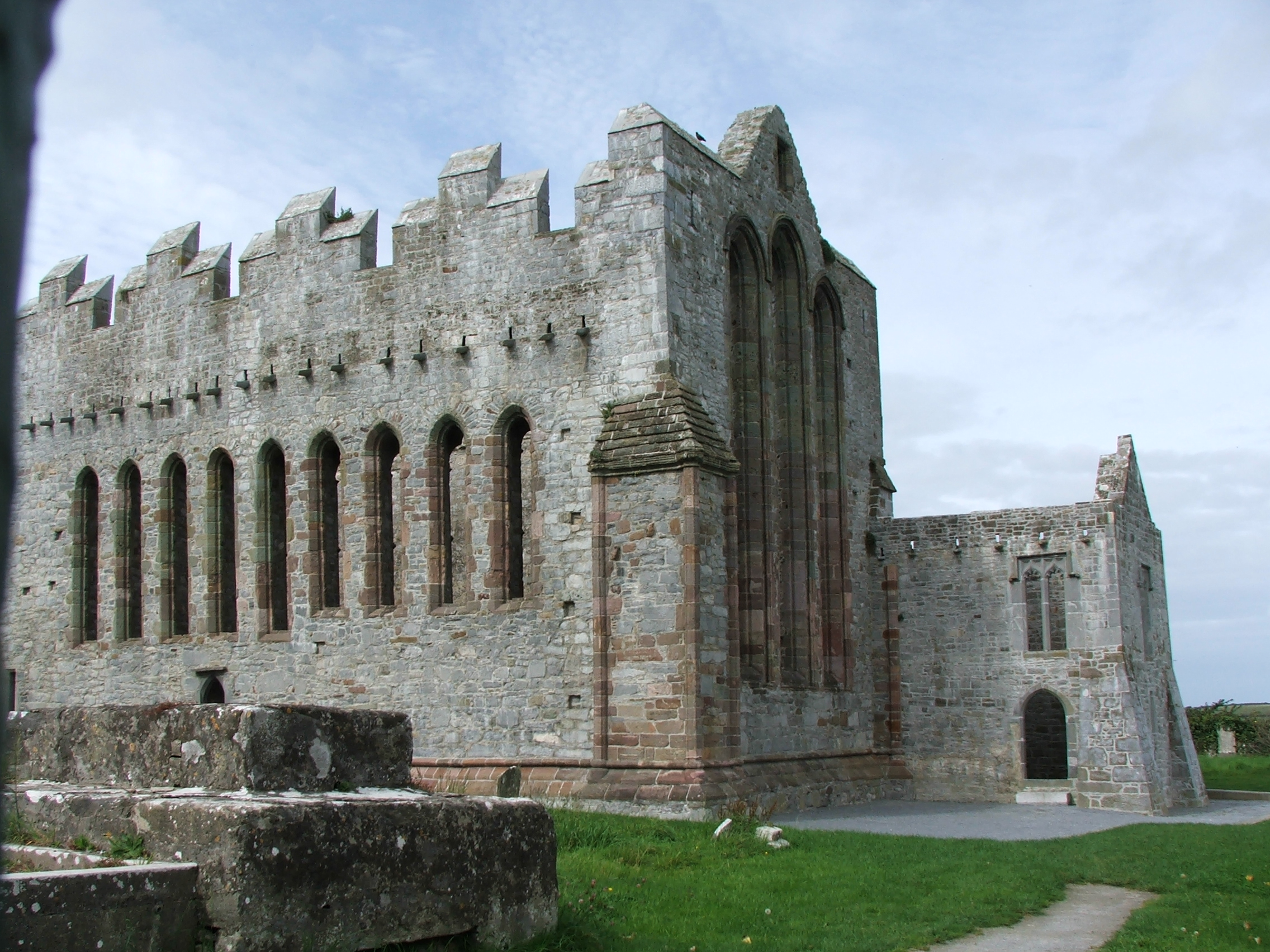
St. Brendan's Cathedral, Ardfert

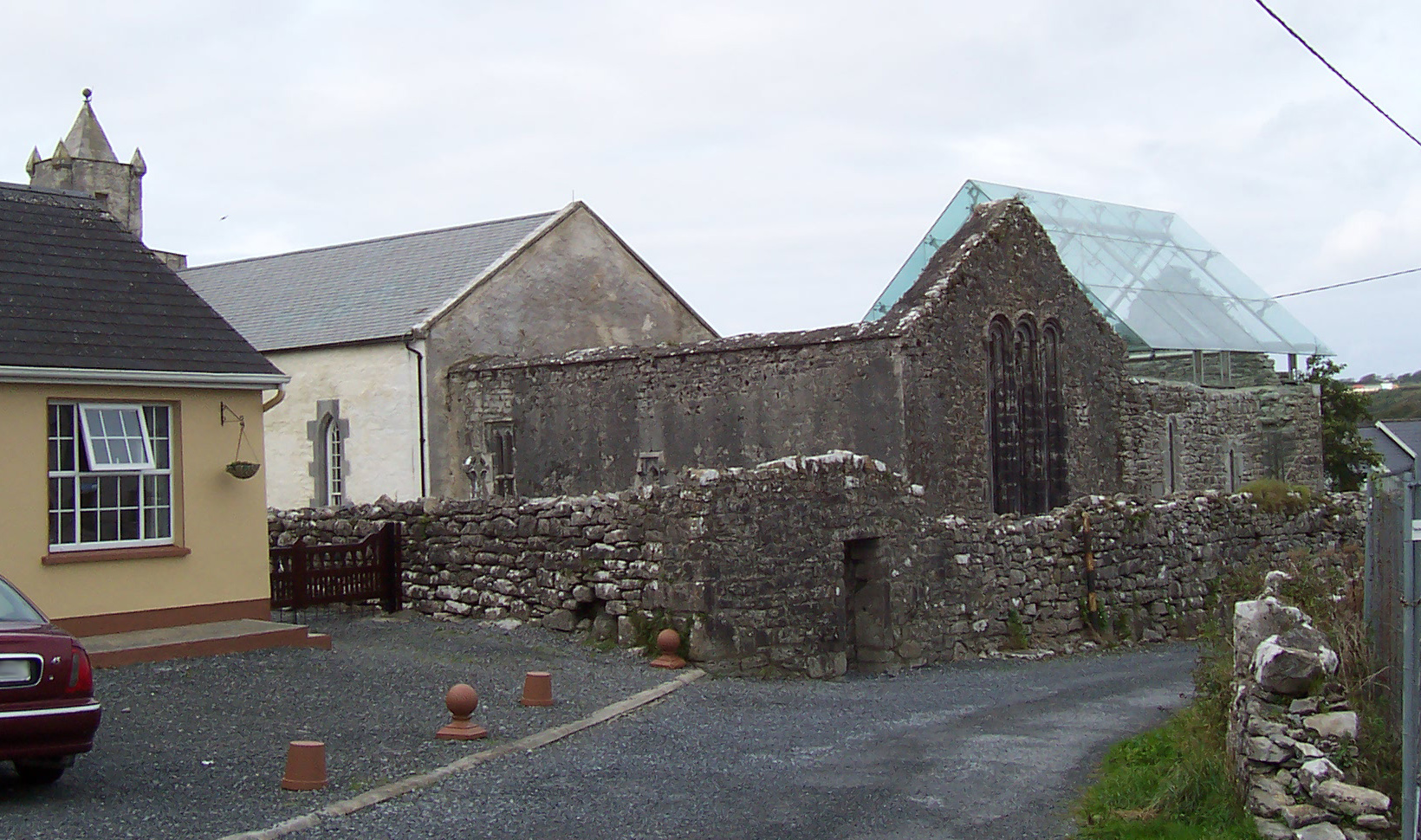
St. Fachnan's Cathedral, Kilfenora

- St Mary's Cathedral, Limerick,
- St Flannan's Cathedral, Killaloe,
- St Brendan's Cathedral, Clonfert.

Five others are in ruins or no longer exist:

- St Brendan's Cathedral, Ardfert was destroyed by fire in 1641
- St Alibeus' Cathedral, Emly was demolished in 1877.
- Kilmacduagh cathedral, which is partly in ruins
- Aghadoe Cathedral, which is partly in ruins
- Kilfenora Cathedral, which is partly in ruins, dates from the 12th century.

== Parish groups ==
The diocese was divided into a number of parish groups.

- Adare Group: St Nicholas', Adare • Croom • St Andrew's, Kilfinane • St Peter & St Paul's, Kilmallock • St Beacon's, Kilpeacon • Knockaney.
- Aughrim Group: St Catherine's, Ahascragh • Ardrahan • Holy Trinity, Aughrim • St Matthew's, Clontuskert • St John the Evangelist's, Creagh • Woodlawn, Kilconell.
- Birr Group: St Brendan's, Birr • Dorrha • Lockeen • St Ruadhan's, Lorrha.
- Clonfert (Cathedral) Group: St Brendan's Cathedral, Clonfert • St John the Baptist's, Donanaughta • Christ Church's, Lickmolassy • St Paul's, Rynagh.
- Cloughjordan Group: Ballingarry • Borrisnafarney • Borrisokane • St Kieran's, Cloughjordan.
- Drumcliffe (Ennis) Group: St Columba, Drumcliffe • Kilfarboy • St Fachan's, Kilfenora • St James', Kilfieragh • Kilnasoolagh • Christ Church's, Shannon.
- Kenmare Group: St Michael & All Angels', Dromod • St Patrick's, Kenmare • Church of the Transfiguration, Kilcrohane • St John the Baptist's, Valentia.
- Kilcolman (Milltown) Group: St John's, Glenbeigh • Kilcolman • St Michael's, Killorglin • St Carthage's, Kiltallagh • Knockane.
- Killaloe (Cathedral) Group: Inniscaltra • St Flannan's Cathedral, Killaloe • St Senan's, Kiltinanlea • All Saints', Stradbally • St. Cronan's Church, Tuamgraney.
- Killarney Group: St Mary, Killarney • Holy Trinity, Muckross.
- Limerick (Cathedral) Group: St Mary's Cathedral, Limerick • Abington • St Michael's, Limerick.
- Nenagh Group: Killodiernan • St Mary's, Nenagh • Templederry.
- Rathkeale Group: St Mary's, Askeaton • Kilcornan • Kilnaughtin • Holy Trinity, Rathkeale.
- Roscrea Group: St Burchin's, Bourney • Christ Church's, Corbally • St Molua, Kyle • St Cronan's, Roscrea.
- Shinrone Group: Aghancon • Dunkerrin • St Finnian's, Kinnitty • St Mary's, Shinrone.
- Tralee Group: Ballymacelligott • Ballyseedy • St James's, Dingle • Kilgobbin, Camp • Killiney, Castlegregory • St John's, Tralee.
- Plus the University of Limerick.

== List of bishops ==
- Edwin Owen (1976–1981)
- Walton Newcombe Francis Empey (1981–1985)
- Edward Flewett Darling (1985–2000)
- Michael Hugh Gunton Mayes (2000–2008)
- Trevor Williams (2008–2014)
- Kenneth Kearon (2015–2021)

== See also ==
- Dean of Limerick and Ardfert
- Dean of Killaloe and Clonfert
- List of Anglican dioceses in the United Kingdom and Ireland
- Roman Catholic Diocese of Limerick
- Roman Catholic Diocese of Kerry (formerly Ardfert and Aghadoe)
- Roman Catholic Diocese of Killaloe
- Roman Catholic Diocese of Galway, Kilmacduagh and Kilfenora
- Roman Catholic Diocese of Clonfert
- Roman Catholic Archdiocese of Cashel and Emly
