= Diocese of Ardagh =

The Diocese of Ardagh can refer to:

- The Roman Catholic Diocese of Ardagh and Clonmacnoise
- The former Church of Ireland diocese of Ardagh is now incorporated within the united Diocese of Kilmore, Elphin and Ardagh

== See also ==
- The Bishop of Ardagh
- The Bishop of Kilmore, Elphin and Ardagh
