= Isaac Hanna =

Isaac Hanna is an Anglican priest. He has been Archdeacon of Elphin and Ardagh.

Hanna was born in 1970, educated at York St John University, (Commissioned) Church Army Evangelist 2001, and served in Christ Church Fulwood (Sheffield), Killowen (Coleraine). His first post was as Bishop's curate at Bovevagh and Dungiven. After that he held incumbencies at Maghera and Drumcliff.
