= St John the Baptist Cathedral, Sligo =

- The Cathedral Church of St Mary the Virgin and St John the Baptist, Sligo
- Ardeaglais na Maighdine Muire agus Naomh Eoin Baiste, Sligeach
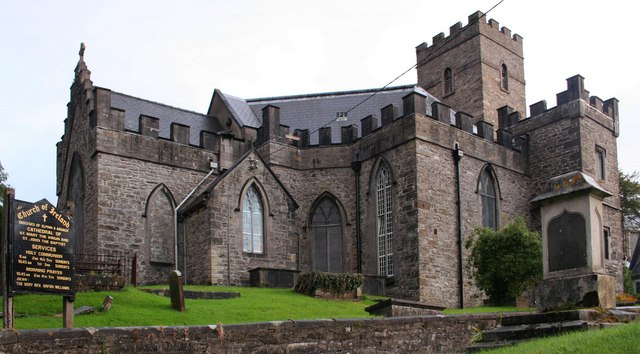
- St John the Baptist Cathedral, Sligo
- 54°16′13″N 08°28′38″W
- Location: Sligo
- Country: Ireland
- Denomination: Church of Ireland
- Website: https://www.dkea.ie/parishes/elphin/#sligo

History
- Consecrated: 18th century (25 October 1961 as a cathedral)

Architecture
- Groundbreaking: c. 1730

Administration
- Province: Province of Armagh
- Diocese: Diocese of Kilmore, Elphin and Ardagh

Clergy
- Bishop: The Right Reverend Ferran Glenfield
- Dean: The Very Reverend Arfon Williams

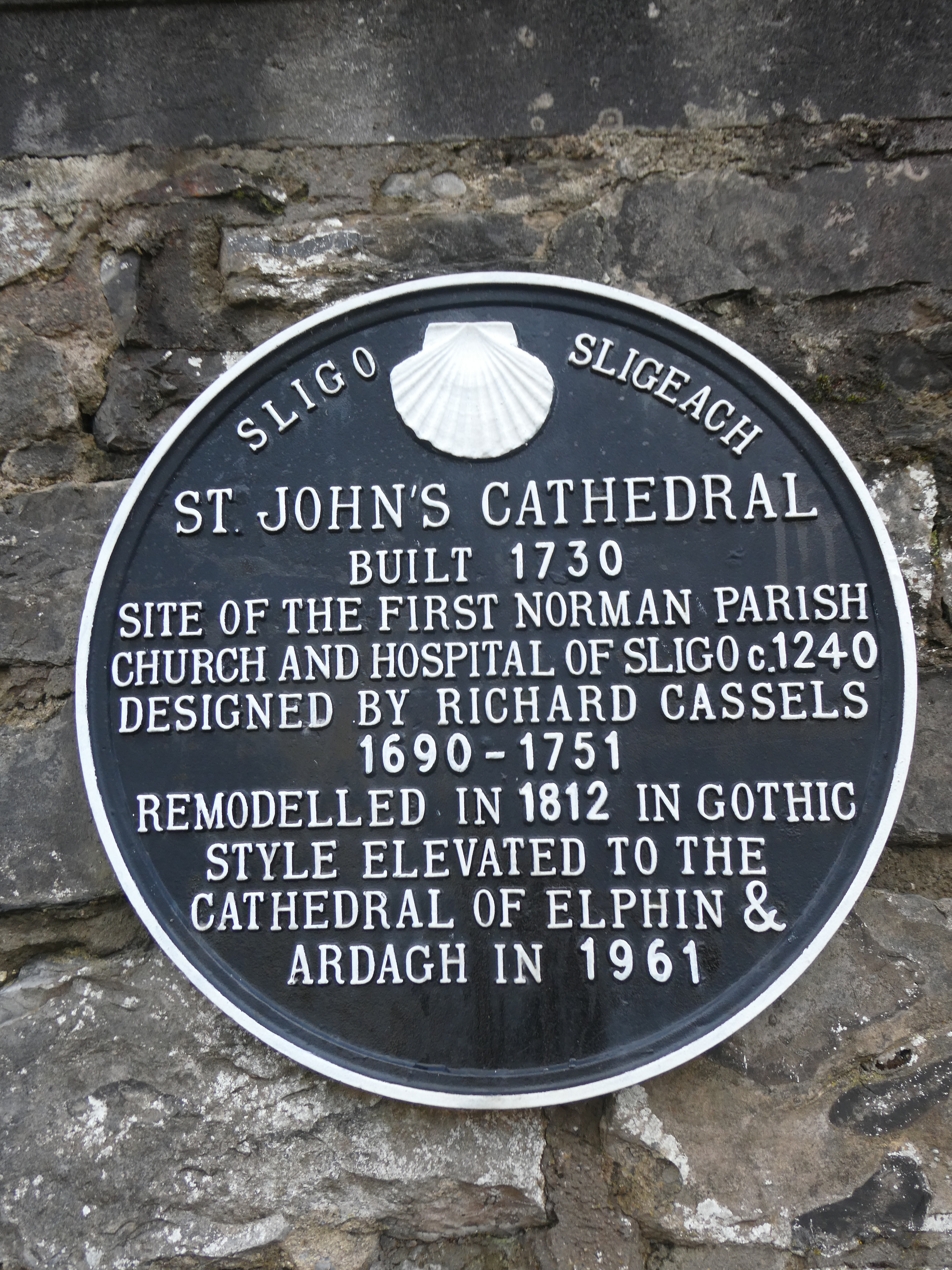
Informational sign

St John the Baptist Cathedral, Sligo or more properly the Cathedral of St Mary the Virgin and St John the Baptist, Sligo but also known as Sligo Cathedral is one of two cathedral churches in the diocese of Kilmore, Elphin and Ardagh (the other is St Fethlimidh's Cathedral, Kilmore) in the Church of Ireland. It is situated in the town of Sligo, Ireland in the ecclesiastical province of Armagh. The cathedral is the oldest building still in continuous use in the town.

== History ==
The site on which the church was built was originally a 13th-century hospital and parish. The current church's west tower is thought to contain remnants of the original building.

German architect Richard Cassels originally came to Sligo in 1730 in order to design Hazelwood House for the Wynne family. At the same time he was also commissioned to design St. John's Church. Sir Roger Jones built the church using Cassels' designs in about 1730.

In 1961, the Elphin and Ardagh diocese cathedral church was abandoned after sustaining significant damage during a storm in 1957. The Seat of the Bishop of Elphin and Ardagh was subsequently transferred to St. John's Church and on 25 October 1961, St. John's officially became the Cathedral Church of the Elphin and Ardagh dioceses, under the name of the Cathedral of St. Mary the Virgin and St. John the Baptist.

== Architecture ==
Cassels was inspired by Roman architecture and used basilica patterns from that time.

In 1812 and 1883, the church underwent significant renovations. During this time, the round-arched Romanesque windows were removed, and the chancel was expanded. Additionally, small towers and battlements were added to the building. However, some of the original Romanesque windows still survive in the west tower.

== See also ==
- Dean of Elphin and Ardagh
- List of cathedrals in Ireland
