= Albert Hughes (bishop) =

Albert Edward Hughes (13 February 1878 – 11 May 1954) was Bishop of Kilmore, Elphin and Ardagh from 1939 to 1950.

Educated at Trinity College Dublin, he was an Inspector of Education for the Diocese of Dublin, Rector of Rathfarnham and then Christ Church Leeson Park before ordination to the episcopate as the 10th bishop of the United Diocese.

Albert Edward Hughes (13 February 1878 – 11 May 1954) was the son of John and Margaret Hughes who are buried in the graveyard at Rathmolyon, County Meath. His siblings were Arthur Charles Hughes, William Henry Hughes, Anne Hughes, John Maddoc Hughes, Archibald Hughes, Charles Clement Hughes and Edith Elizabeth Hughes. Their births are registered in the Registry of Births at Ardrahan, Co Galway.

He graduated from the old Royal University of Ireland in mathematics and mathematical physics in 1902 and afterwards entered Trinity College. He received the Divinity Testimonium in 1907 and took his MA degree in 1911, receiving the D.D. degree (jure dignatatis) in 1939.

Following his ordination in 1907 he was appointed headmaster of Christ Church Cathedral Grammar School and curate of Drumcondra and North Strand where he remained until 1911. Afterwards he was curate and then Rector of Rathfarnham until 1921 when he became rector of the Mariners' Church, Dún Laoghaire, where he remained for three years. During the period 1907 to 1917 he was diocesan inspector of religious education in Dublin. From 1912 to 1919 he was a minor canon of St Patrick's Cathedral and in 1920-1921 he was chaplain to the Lord Lieutenant.

In 1923 he was appointed rector of Christ Church, Leeson Park, Dublin and he spent the next 15 years of his ministry there until his election to the House of Bishops. (The Church of Ireland closed the church in Leeson Park in May 2005 because of reduced numbers attending the church. Since 1972 the church had been shared with the Methodist Centenary congregation, following the destruction of the Methodist Centenary Church, St Stephen's Green by fire a few years before. The intention was that the church would be used on Sundays and holy days by the Rumanian Orthodox church from June 2005 onwards.)

In 1929 he was appointed a canon of Christ Church Cathedral and in 1933 he was appointed canon and prebend of Dunlavin in St Patrick's Cathedral, Dublin in room of Canon Thomas Arnold Harvey who had been elected Dean of St Patrick's.

While Rector of Christ Church, Leeson Park, he was also chaplain to the Molyneux Female Blind Asylum and in this, as in many other charitable works, he was an indefatigable worker and a first rate organiser. When his chaplaincy came to an end the trustees of the institution put on record their appreciation of the zealous manner in which Canon Hughes had discharged the work of both chaplain and rector.

On the death of Archbishop Day in 1938, Hughes became Bishop-elect of Armagh in order to complete the House of Bishops. When the Archbishop Gregg succeeded to the primacy and Bishop Barton, Bishop of Kilmore, became Archbishop of Dublin, Hughes became bishop of the vacant diocese of Kilmore, Elphin and Ardagh. He was consecrated in St Patrick's Cathedral, Armagh on St Mark's Day, 25 April 25, 1939.

As a bishop he continued to show the same earnest and unfailing zeal in the carrying out of his episcopal duties that had characterised the earlier years of his ministry. His retirement on 12 May 1950 for health reasons was deeply regretted by the General Synod of the Church of Ireland.

He was one of the best known and most popular men in the church and during the years when he ministered in Dublin, he made many friends, both clerical and lay and was admired and respected by all who knew him. Having been a teacher himself, he was keenly interested in education and on many occasions spoke effectively on the subject, both in the Dublin Synod and in the General Synod. In Dublin he was a member of the governing bodies of several schools and took a special interest in the work of the Incorporated Society for Promoting Protestant Schools in Ireland. His wide parochial experience and activities were an invaluable background when he was asked to assume the responsibilities of bishop.

Throughout his life Hughes was a rugby football enthusiast. As a young man he had played for Surrey County and at one time was captain of the Dublin Wanderers’ Club.

Albert's obituary describes him as “a distinguished Churchman, a great Christian, a fine scholar and a notable organiser”.

A portrait of Hughes is held by the National Portrait Gallery in London. It was painted by Lafayette (Lafayette Ltd) and is a vintage bromide print, circa 1920s measuring 5 3/4 in. x 3 7/8 in and was given to the National Portrait Gallery by Corporation of Church House, 1949.

In 1911 Hughes married Marguerite Hall Baker. They had three children; Brian Hughes, John Derrick Watson Hughes and Hazel Hughes.

== Notes ==
Religious titles
Preceded by Arthur William Barton	Bishop of Kilmore, Elphin and Ardagh; 1939 –1950	Succeeded by Frederick Julian Mitchell
