= Diocese of Limerick =

Diocese of Limerick may refer to:

- The former Church of Ireland Diocese of Limerick is now incorporated within the united Diocese of Tuam, Limerick and Killaloe
- Roman Catholic Diocese of Limerick
