= Michael Mayes =

Michael Mayes may refer to:

- Michael Mayes (bishop)
- Michael Mayes (American football)
