= Astley's Amphitheatre (disambiguation) =

Astley's Amphitheatre may refer to:

- Amphithéâtre Astley, Paris, France
- Astley's Amphitheatre (Dublin), Ireland
- Astley's Amphitheatre, London, England
- Astley's Amphitheatre (Melbourne), Australia

== See also ==
- Philip Astley, founder of eponymous circus and theatre
