= Province of Armagh =

Province of Armagh may refer to

- Province of Armagh (Church of Ireland)
- Province of Armagh (Roman Catholic)

== See also ==
- Ulster, secular province whose territory corresponds roughly to that of the Roman Catholic ecclesiastical province
