= List of cathedrals in Ireland =

This article lists the current and former cathedrals of the main Christian churches in Ireland. Since the main denominations are organised on an all-Ireland basis, this article includes information about both jurisdictions: Northern Ireland and the Republic of Ireland.

== Overview ==
It is a commonly held perception that the term 'cathedral' may be applied to any particularly large or grand church. Whilst many cathedrals may be such, this is due to their ecclesiastical status (such a church is grand because it is a cathedral, rather than it being a cathedral because of its grandeur). A cathedral may therefore be a smaller building, particularly where they exist in sparser or poorer communities. Modern cathedrals may lack the grandeur of former times, focussing on the functional aspect of a place of worship, though it should be borne in mind that many of the grand and ancient cathedrals of today were originally built to a much smaller plan, and have been successively extended and rebuilt over the centuries. Some cathedrals were purpose-built as such, whilst others were formerly parochial, or parish churches, subsequently promoted in status due to ecclesiastical requirements such as periodic diocesan reorganisation.

Essentially, a cathedral church is a Christian place of worship that is the chief, or 'mother' church of an episcopal see and is distinguished as such by being the location for the cathedra or bishop's seat. Strictly speaking therefore, only those Christian denominations with an Episcopal polity possess cathedrals. However, the label 'cathedral' remains in common parlance for notable churches which were formerly part of an episcopal denomination, such as may be the case with some Scottish churches which are now within the Presbyterian Church of Scotland (see List of cathedrals in Scotland). In addition, former cathedrals which may now be in a ruined state, retain their nominal status.

The following list comprises, for the Republic of Ireland and Northern Ireland, all locations of a current cathedral church, or former cathedral church, as well as those locations where no trace remains of the structure, indeed where the precise location is no longer known.

Also included are those structures or sites of intended cathedrals as well as pro-cathedrals (churches serving as an interim cathedral), for instance, whilst a permanent cathedral is acquired, or (as a co-cathedral where the diocesan demographics/geography requires the bishop's seat to be shared with a building in an alternate location).

The inclusion of the entire island of Ireland is strictly for ecclesiastical reasons. Northern Ireland is represented because, although it politically comprises part of the United Kingdom, ecclesiastically the island comprises a single geographically based unit.

In the list which follows the cathedrals are listed by denomination and (where applicable) denominational hierarchy. Disused establishments are listed separately.

The geographical co-ordinates provided are sourced from details provided by Ordnance Survey Ireland.

Terms not covered in the above preamble include translated, which is the move of a bishop's seat from one location to another, moving cathedral status from the former church and bestowing it on the destination church, such as may occur in a diocesan or provincial re-organisation.

== Abbreviations and key ==
- + indicates non-cathedral ecclesiastical use.
- NM = National Monument

== Listing of establishments ==
=== Catholic Church ===
==== Province of Armagh ====
Establishment	Image	Dedication	Established	Notes/provenance	Location & website
Armagh		St. Patrick	1870	Archdiocese of Armagh	54°21′08″N 6°39′37″W
Belfast		St. Peter	1866	Diocese of Down and Connor Architects Jeremiah McAuley, a native Belfast priest and John O'Neill	54°35′57″N 5°56′40″W
Cavan		St. Patrick and St. Feidlim	1942	Diocese of Kilmore	53°59′54″N 7°21′40″W
Derry		St. Eugene	1873	Diocese of Derry	55°00′00″N 7°19′42″W
Letterkenny		St. Eunan and St. Columba	1901	Diocese of Raphoe	54°57′01″N 7°44′24″W
Longford		St. Mel	1840	Diocese of Ardagh and Clonmacnois Destroyed by fire in December 2009, then restored and reopened on 24 December 2014.	53°43′38″N 7°47′47″W
Monaghan		St. Macartan	1892	Diocese of Clogher	54°14′41″N 6°57′31″W
Mullingar		Christ the King	1936	Diocese of Meath	53°31′37″N 7°20′47″W
Newry		St. Patrick and St. Colman	1829	Diocese of Dromore	54°10′29″N 6°20′16″W

==== Province of Cashel ====
Establishment	Image	Dedication	Established	Notes/provenance	Location & website
Cobh		St. Colman	1915	Diocese of Cloyne	51°51′05″N 8°17′36″W
Cork		St. Mary and St. Anne	1869	Diocese of Cork and Ross pro-cathedral	51°54′17″N 8°28′35″W
Ennis		St. Peter and St. Paul	1843	Diocese of Killaloe pro-cathedral	52°50′30″N 8°59′00″W
Killarney		The Assumption of the Blessed Virgin Mary	1855	Diocese of Kerry (Ardfert & Aghadoe)	52°03′34″N 9°31′07″W
Limerick		St. John the Baptist	1859	Diocese of Limerick	52°39′44″N 8°37′02″W
Skibbereen		St. Patrick	1826	Diocese of Cork and Ross	51°33′08″N 9°15′49″W
Thurles		The Assumption of the Blessed Virgin Mary	1879	Archdiocese of Cashel and Emly built on the site of a Carmelite Priory	52°40′48″N 7°48′35″W
Waterford		The Most Holy Trinity	1796	Diocese of Waterford and Lismore	52°15′41″N 7°06′40″W

==== Province of Dublin ====
Establishment	Image	Dedication	Established	Notes/provenance	Location & website
Carlow		The Assumption of the Blessed Virgin Mary	1839	Diocese of Kildare and Leighlin	52°50′13″N 6°55′41″W
Dublin		The Immaculate Conception of the Blessed Virgin Mary	1825	Archdiocese of Dublin pro-cathedral	53°21′03″N 6°15′33″W
Enniscorthy		St. Aidan	1860	Diocese of Ferns	52°30′09″N 6°34′16″W
Kilkenny		The Assumption of the Blessed Virgin Mary	1857	Diocese of Ossory	52°39′09″N 7°15′25″W

==== Province of Tuam ====
Establishment	Image	Dedication	Established	Notes/provenance	Location & website
Ballaghaderreen		The Annunciation of the Blessed Virgin Mary and St Nathy	1860	Diocese of Achonry	53°54′13″N 8°34′41″W
Ballina		St Muredach	1892	Diocese of Killala	54°06′46″N 9°09′02″W
Galway		St. Nicholas and Our Lady Assumed into Heaven	1965	Diocese of Galway, Kilmacduagh and Kilfenora	53°16′31″N 9°03′27″W
Loughrea		St. Brendan	1902	Diocese of Clonfert	53°11′49″N 8°34′01″W
Sligo		The Immaculate Conception of the Blessed Virgin Mary	1874	Diocese of Elphin	54°16′12″N 8°28′42″W
Tuam		The Assumption of the Blessed Virgin Mary	1837	Archdiocese of Tuam	53°30′55″N 8°50′51″W

=== Church of Ireland ===
==== Province of Armagh ====
Establishment	Image	Dedication	Established	Notes/provenance	Location & website	Diocese
Armagh		The Cathedral and Metropolitan Church of St. Patrick	445		54°20′51″N 6°39′23″W	Armagh
Belfast		St. Anne	1904		54°36′10″N 5°55′43″W	Connor and Down and Dromore
Clogher		St. Macartan	1744	on site of an ancient monastery	54°24′39″N 7°10′19″W	Clogher
Derry		St. Columb	1633		54°59′38″N 7°19′23″W	Derry and Raphoe
Downpatrick		The Holy and Undivided Trinity	1818	(also known as Down Cathedral) on site of ancient monastery	54°19′40″N 5°43′16″W	Down and Dromore
Dromore		Christ the Redeemer	1609	on site of an earlier church	54°24′53″N 6°09′06″W	Down and Dromore
Enniskillen		St. Macartan	1923	former 17thC parish church	54°20′48″N 7°38′28″W	Clogher
Kilmore		St. Fethlimidh	1860	Bedell Memorial Church	53°59′35″N 07°24′46″W	Kilmore, Elphin and Ardagh
Lisburn		Christ Church	1662		54°30′41″N 6°02′30″W	Connor
Raphoe		St. Eunan	9thC	on site of 6thC monastery	54°52′26″N 7°35′53″W	Derry and Raphoe
Sligo		St. Mary the Virgin and St. John the Baptist	1874		54°16′13″N 8°28′38″W	Kilmore, Elphin and Ardagh

==== Province of Dublin ====
Establishment	Image	Dedication	Established	Notes/provenance	Location & website	Diocese
Cashel		St. John the Baptist and St. Patrick's Rock	1780		52°30′56″N 7°53′08″W	Cashel and Ossory
Clonfert		St. Brendan			53°14′22″N 8°03′32″W	Tuam, Limerick and Killaloe
Cloyne		St. Colman			51°51′42″N 8°07′09″W	Cork, Cloyne and Ross
Cork		St. Fin Barre	1870		51°53′40″N 8°28′49″W	Cork, Cloyne and Ross
Dublin		The Holy Trinity		commonly called Christ Church Cathedral	53°20′36″N 6°16′16″W	Dublin and Glendalough
Dublin		St. Patrick		The National Cathedral is not a cathedral of the Diocese of Dublin. It has a common relationship with all the dioceses of the Church of Ireland.	53.339444°N 6.271417°W	Dublin and Glendalough
Ferns		St. Edan			52°35′23″N 6°29′36″W	Cashel and Ossory
Kildare		St. Brigid			53°09′29″N 6°54′41″W	Meath and Kildare
Kilfenora		St. Fachtan	c.1200	partly ruined; nave in use for worship	52°59′28″N 9°12′57″W	Tuam, Limerick and Killaloe
Kilkenny		St. Canice			52.654161°N 7.257505°W	Cashel and Ossory
Killala		St. Patrick	17thC		54°12′44″N 9°13′15″W	Tuam, Limerick and Killaloe
Killaloe		St. Flannan	12thC	founded (on the site of an earlier monastery) in 1185 by Donal Mor O'Brien	52°48′23″N 8°26′21″W	Tuam, Limerick and Killaloe
Leighlin		St. Laserian			52°44′11″N 7°01′34″W	Cashel and Ossory
Limerick		The Blessed Virgin Mary	1168		52°40′05″N 8°37′24″W	Tuam, Limerick and Killaloe
Lismore		The Blessed Virgin Mary and Saint Carthage			52°08′23″N 7°55′44″W	Cashel and Ossory
Rosscarbery		St. Fachtna			51°34′41″N 9°01′47″W	Cork, Cloyne and Ross
Trim		St. Patrick	1954	19thC Parish Church	53°33′30″N 6°47′26″W	Meath and Kildare
Tuam		St. Mary	19thC		53°30′50″N 8°51′19″W	Tuam, Limerick and Killaloe
Waterford		The Holy Trinity	1770	Commonly called Christ Church Cathedral	52°15′36″N 7°06′27″W	Cashel and Ossory

=== Former cathedrals ===
With some exceptions, these former cathedrals were established prior to the Reformation in Ireland and the subsequent transfer of Church assets to the Established church. Most had ceased to be cathedrals prior to the establishment of the Church of Ireland.

Establishment	Image	Dedication	Established	Notes/provenance	Location & website
Achonry		St. Crumnathy	1822–1997	Closed in 1997. The cathedral was built on the site of a monastery	54°04′39″N 8°39′15″W
Aghadoe			1158	Abandoned by 1740. Now in ruins.	52°04′37″N 9°33′16″W
Annaghdown		St. Brendan	10thC		54°04′39″N 8°39′15″W
Ardagh		Mél of Ardagh	10thC	Although reputed to date from the time of St Mél, the structure visible today is a 9th- or 10th-century building.	53°40′02″N 7°41′33″W
Ardfert		St. Brendan	13thC	destroyed by fire 1641 (NM)	52°19′44″N 9°46′55″W
Ardmore			13thC		51°56′56″N 7°43′34″W
Cashel					52°31′13″N 7°53′28″W
Clonard		St. John		destroyed by fire 1206	
Connor ^{+}		St. Saviour		destroyed in the Irish Rebellion of 1641; CI Parish Church on site	54°48′26″N 6°12′45″W
Duleek				Co. Meath	
Elphin		St. Mary the Virgin		Church of Ireland parish church, wrecked by storm damage in the 1950s, now ruined; diocese amalgamated with Sligo	53°50′43″N 8°11′26″W
Emly		St. Alibeus		demolished 1877	
Fermoy		St. Patrick		co-cathedral, now parochial church	52°08′11″N 8°16′47″W
Glendalough		St. Peter and St. Paul	7th-13thC	(NM)	53°00′38″N 6°19′37″W
Kilmacduagh		St. Colman	15thC	(NM)	53°02′52″N 8°53′17″W
Newtown-Trim		St. Peter and St. Paul	15thC	(NM)	53°33′21″N 6°46′19″W
Scattery Island				Co. Clare	52°36′51″N 9°31′00″W

== See also ==
- List of abbeys and priories
- List of basilicas in Ireland
- List of cathedrals in the United Kingdom
- List of English cathedrals
- List of monasteries dissolved by Henry VIII of England
- List of monastic houses in England
- List of monastic houses in Ireland
- List of monastic houses in Scotland
- List of monastic houses in Wales
- List of monastic houses on the Isle of Man
- Dissolution of the monasteries
