= John Darley =

John Darley may refer to:

- John Darley (bishop) (1799–1884), Irish Anglican bishop
- John Darley (politician) (born 1937), Australian politician
- John M. Darley (1938–2018), American social psychologist
