= List of Anglican diocesan bishops in Great Britain and Ireland =

This article lists Diocesan Bishops and Archbishops in the Church of England, the Church in Wales, the Scottish Episcopal Church, and the Church of Ireland.

== In the Church of England ==
Province of Canterbury

- Archbishop of Canterbury
- Bishop of London
- Bishop of Winchester
- Bishop of Bath and Wells
- Bishop of Birmingham
- Bishop of Bristol
- Bishop of Chelmsford
- Bishop of Chichester
- Bishop of Coventry
- Bishop of Derby
- Bishop of Ely
- Bishop of Exeter
- Bishop of Gibraltar in Europe
- Bishop of Gloucester
- Bishop of Guildford
- Bishop of Hereford
- Bishop of Leicester
- Bishop of Lichfield
- Bishop of Lincoln
- Bishop of Norwich
- Bishop of Oxford
- Bishop of Peterborough
- Bishop of Portsmouth
- Bishop of Rochester
- Bishop of Salisbury
- Bishop of Southwark
- Bishop of St Albans
- Bishop of St Edmundsbury & Ipswich
- Bishop of Truro
- Bishop of Worcester

Province of York

- Archbishop of York
- Bishop of Durham
- Bishop of Blackburn
- Bishop of Carlisle
- Bishop of Chester
- Bishop of Liverpool
- Bishop of Leeds
- Bishop of Manchester
- Bishop of Newcastle
- Bishop of Sheffield
- Bishop of Sodor and Man
- Bishop of Southwell and Nottingham

== In the Church in Wales ==
- Archbishop of Wales
- Bishop of Bangor
- Bishop of Llandaff
- Bishop of Monmouth
- Bishop of St Asaph
- Bishop of St David's
- Bishop of Swansea and Brecon

== In the Scottish Episcopal Church ==
- Primus of the Scottish Episcopal Church
- Bishop of Aberdeen and Orkney
- Bishop of Argyll and the Isles
- Bishop of Brechin
- Bishop of Edinburgh
- Bishop of Glasgow and Galloway
- Bishop of Moray, Ross and Caithness
- Bishop of St Andrews, Dunkeld and Dunblane

== In the Church of Ireland ==
Province of Armagh

- Archbishop of Armagh
- Bishop of Clogher
- Bishop of Connor
- Bishop of Derry and Raphoe
- Bishop of Down and Dromore
- Bishop of Kilmore, Elphin and Ardagh

Province of Dublin

- Archbishop of Dublin
- Bishop of Cashel and Ossory
- Bishop of Cork, Cloyne and Ross
- Bishop of Tuam, Limerick and Killaloe
- Bishop of Meath and Kildare

== See also ==
- List of bishops in the Church of England
- List of Anglican dioceses in Great Britain and Ireland
