= William Moore (bishop) =

Bishop of Kilmore, Elphin and Ardagh

The Rt Rev William Richard Moore ( 1858–1930) was Bishop of Kilmore, Elphin and Ardagh from 1915 to 1930.

Educated at Trinity College, Dublin, he was ordained in 1882 and his first post a curacy at Temple Michael. After this he was Vicar of Donnybrook and Kiltoghert. He was Archdeacon of Ardagh from 1896 until his elevation to the episcopate as the 9th bishop of the United Diocese. He was additionally Dean of Ardagh from 1920.

== Notes ==
Religious titles
Preceded by Alfred George Elliott	Bishop of Kilmore, Elphin and Ardagh; 1915 –1930	Succeeded by Arthur William Barton
