= Dearmid O'Cuana =

13th-century Irish priest

Dearmid O'Cuana (died 1248), also spelled Dairmid O'Cuana, was a priest of the Diocese of Elphin in what is now County Sligo, Ireland. He is referred to by two sources as the "great priest of Elphin."

From the Annála Connacht (Annals of Loc Ce) of 1248 (Author: [unknown]):

1248.2 Diarmait O Cuanna, the great priest of Elphin, died and was buried at Kilmore.

== Sources ==
- Annals of Connacht, ed. and tr. A. Martin Freeman (1944). Annála Connacht: The Annals of Connacht (A.D. 1224-1544). Dublin: DIAS. s.a. 1248. (Edition and translation available from CELT)
- Rootsweb.com
- GoIreland.com
