= Molyneux Asylum =

Coordinates: 53.329895°N 6.252230°W

The Molyneux Asylum for Blind Females
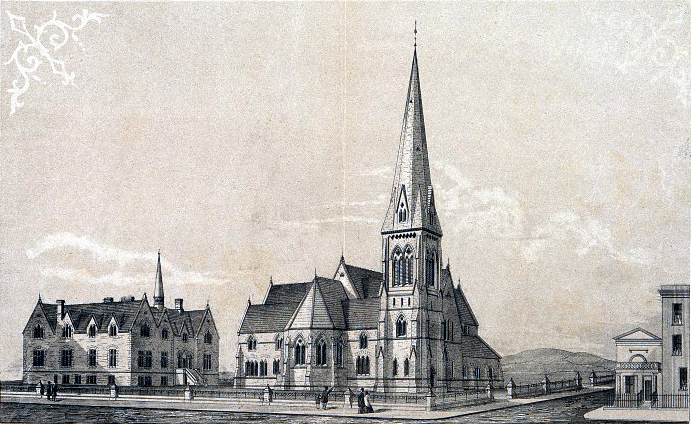
- Molyneux Church and Asylum, Leeson Street Upper, Dublin, 1860
- Peter St., later Leeson Park; Dublin; Ireland

Information
- School type: Asylum for blind females
- Religious affiliation: Church of Ireland (Anglican)
- Opened: 1815
- Closed: 2012

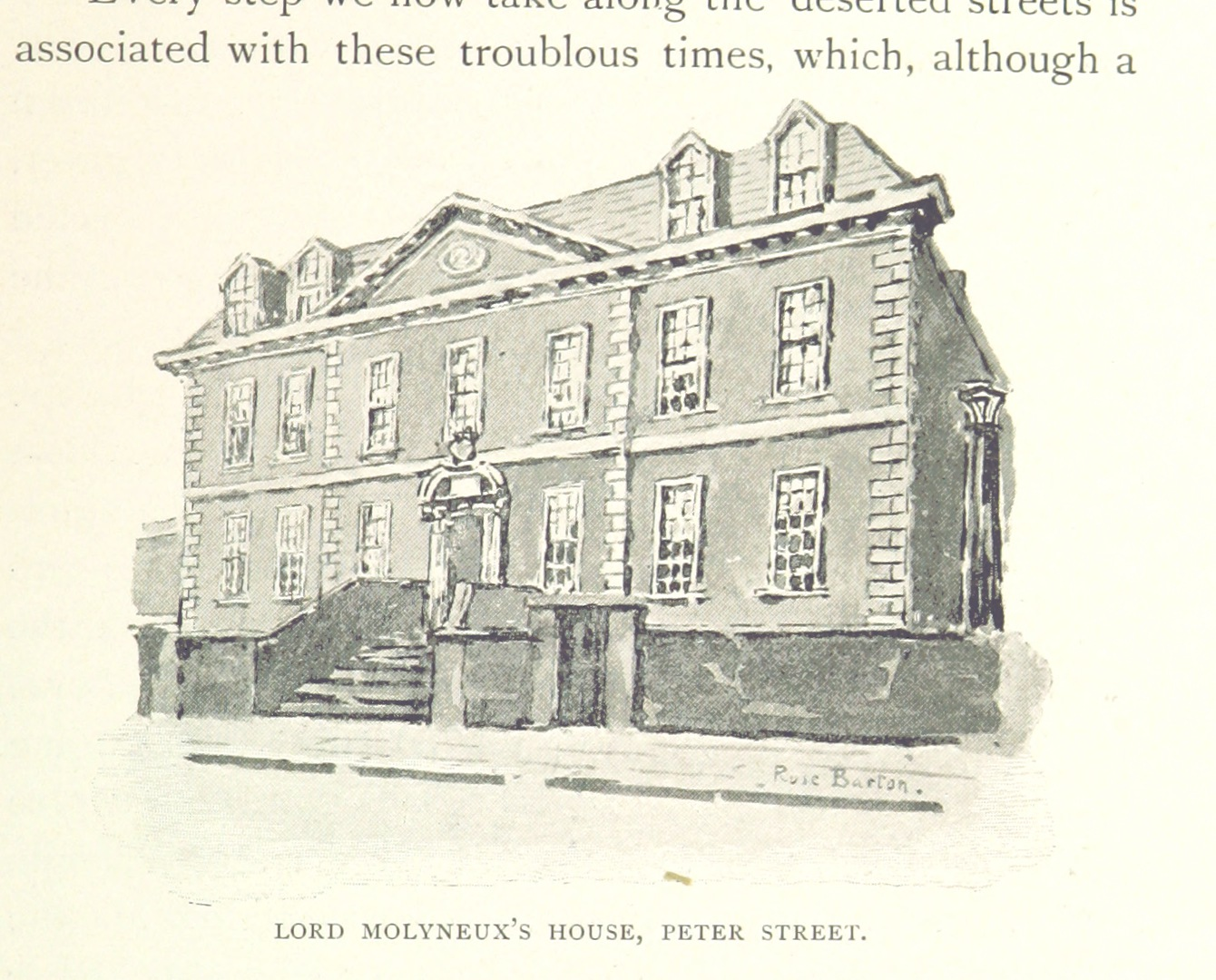
Molyneux House, Peter Street

The Molyneux Asylum for Blind Females was opened June 1, 1815 in Peter Street, Dublin, in what was formerly the residence of Thomas Molyneux (1641-1733), whose sister-in-law, Lucy Domville, had been blind. The building had been sold to Philip Astley, operating as Astley's Amphitheatre from 1789 to 1812, then the actor Henry Johnstone, intended to develop it as a theatre, however it reverted back to the Molyneux and was leased to a charity as an asylum for blind women. There was an Anglican church (Christ Church) attached to the asylum. Music was an important part of the school and worship in the chapel. R.W. Beaty was an organist and music instructor from 1824. Henry Charles Shellard was organist and choirmaster from 1901 to 1955. The chapel was called the Albert Chapel, honoring the Queen's Husband.

It was an exclusively Protestant institution, with all pupils educated in the principles of the Church of England.

A new home for the asylum, along with a church, was constructed between 1860–1862 at Leeson Park. The architect, selected after a competition, was James Rawson Carroll. The adjoining Christ Church Chapel was consecrated in 1868.

The first chaplain was Rev. John Crosthwaite MA; another early chaplain to the asylum was Rev. Piers Edmund Butler. Later came Rev. Dr. Charles Marley Fleury, in Peter St. and continuing with the move to Leeson Park. Rev. William R. Smith, a Rev. Arthur Thomas was a resident chaplain. Chaplain in the mid-19th century was Rev. James Metge, of Carlow. John Duncan Craig was chaplain from 1873 to 1884. Rev. E. Marks and Rev. J.C.Lloyd served as Chaplains. The future Bishop Albert Hughes was a chaplain in the 1920s and 1930s.

Over the years the term Molineux House and Molyneux Institute for Blind Females, began to be used, dropping the outdated word Asylum in the name.

The building became a nursing home, with accommodation for 25 clients. The last client left in 2012, and the leeson park building was sold in 2015 for over 3million euro. The Leeson Park Building and Chapel, are Listed Buildings. The Molyneux Home mission continues in partnership with St John's House, St Mary's Home and under the umbrella of the Protestant Aid, with the development of a new Nursing home at St. John's Merrion Rd.

After the move to Leeson Park, the Molyneux House on Peter Street and Bride Street was used as a hospital and then a night shelter by the Salvation Army; its Chapel was still used by the Church up until the 1920s. In 1943 it was developed by Jacob's Biscuit factory; some of the Chapel walls are incorporated into newer buildings.

== Molyneux Asylum Chapel (Christ Church) ==
Consecrated in 1868 the church was an episcopal church managed and funded by the patrons of the Asylum. It received the dedication of Christ Church in 1873. It became the functioning parish church for the area. As the area grew a chapel of ease St. Columba's, Ranelagh, (the tin church) was founded. In 1961 Christ Church became a separate entity from the Asylum. In 1963 due to a decline in numbers St. Columba's was closed. In 1972 the Methodist Congregation from St. Stephens Green, began to share the church for worship. In 2006 The Methodist Centenary Congregation developed Wesley House on Leeson Park site. Also in 1972 the church was joined with St Bartholomew's Church, Dublin in a cluster of churches sharing clergy. The Church of Ireland ceased to worship as a parish church in 2005, and the parish was formally merged into St. Bartholomews, clyde road. From June 2005 the church was used to hold services for the Romanian Orthodox Community, with Fr. Godfrey O'Donnell and Fr. Calin Florea based there, the church is referred to in Romanian as Biserica Mare (Romanian: The Great Church). There is still a mid-week Eucharist celebrated by the Anglican community in the chapel, and it is also used occasionally by the Methodist Church, the President of the Methodist Church Peter Murray was installed at the church in 2014.

=== Clergy and People associated with the Molyneux Asylum and Christ Church, Leeson Park ===
- Rev. Albert Hughes, served Chaplain to Molyneux Asylum and Rector from 1923-1939, subsequently serving as Bishop of Kilmore
- Rev. John Phair, served as rector until 1923, later became Bishop of Ossory, Ferns and Leighlin
- Rev. Maurice Neligan DD (father of Bishop Moore Neligan) Evangelical clergyman served as rector
- Rev. Edwin Owen, served as a curate, later Bishop of Killaloe and Limerick
- Rev. John Curtis, served as a curate, later served as an Anglican Bishop in China
- Rev. Richard Clarke, served as a curate 1977-79, served as Bishop of Meath, and Archbishop of Armagh
- Rev. John Neill, Archbishop of Dublin, served in St Bartholomew's Church, Dublin with Christ Church Leeson Park from 1978-85.
- Rev. John Armstrong, Archbishop of Armagh, served as Rector of Leeson Park
- T. R. G. Jozé, organist and composer, conducted the Leeson Park Choral Society
