= Alfred Elliott =

Alfred George Elliott (1828–1915) Bishop of Kilmore, Elphin and Ardagh from 1897 to 1915.

Educated at Trinity College Dublin, he ordained in 1858 and his first post a curacy at Bailieborough. He later held Incumbencies at Muntoconnaught, Castleraghan and Drumlease before appointment to the episcopate as the eighth Bishop of the United Diocese.

Religious titles
Preceded by Samuel Shone	Bishop of Kilmore, Elphin and Ardagh; 1897–1915	Succeeded by William Moore
