= George Simms =

Irish Anglican archbishop (1910–1991) and scholar

The Right Reverend George Simms Ph.D.
- Archbishop of Armagh; Primate of All Ireland
- Church: Church of Ireland
- Diocese: Armagh
- Elected: 17 July 1969
- In office: 1969–1980
- Predecessor: James McCann
- Successor: John Armstrong
- Previous posts: Bishop of Cork, Cloyne and Ross (1952–1956); Archbishop of Dublin (1956–1969)

Orders
- Ordination: 1934 (deacon); 1936 (priest)
- Consecration: 28 October 1952 by Arthur Barton

Personal details
- Born: 4 July 1910 Dublin, Ireland
- Died: 15 November 1991 (aged 81) Dublin, Ireland
- Buried: St. Maelruain's Church, Tallaght
- Denomination: Anglican
- Parents: John Francis A Simms; Ottilie Sophie Stange
- Spouse: Mercy Felicia Gwynn
- Education: Cheltenham College; Trinity College, Dublin

George Otto Simms (4 July 1910 – 15 November 1991) was an archbishop in the Church of Ireland, and a scholar.

== Early life and education ==
George Otto Simms was born on 4 July 1910 in North Dublin in Ireland to parents John Francis A Simms & Ottilie Sophie Stange, who were both, according to as his birth certificate, from Lifford, County Donegal. He attended the Prior School in Lifford for a time and later Cheltenham College, a public school in England. He went on to study at Trinity College Dublin, where in 1930 he was elected a Scholar and graduated with a BA in classics in 1932 and a Bachelor of Divinity degree in 1936. He completed a PhD in 1950.

== Clerical career ==
He was ordained a deacon in 1934 and a priest in 1936, beginning his ministry as a curate at St Bartholomew's, Clyde Road, Dublin under Canon W.C. Simpson. In 1937 he took a position in Lincoln Theological College but returned to Dublin in 1939 to become Dean of Residence in Trinity College Dublin and Chaplain Secretary of the Church of Ireland College of Education.

He was appointed Dean of Cork in 1952. Consecrated a bishop, he served as Bishop of Cork, Cloyne and Ross, between 1952 and 1956. At forty-two, he was the youngest Church of Ireland clergyman appointed to a bishopric since John Gregg in 1915. He served as Archbishop of Dublin, from 1956 to 1969. During this time, he maintained a courteous relationship with John Charles McQuaid, his Roman Catholic counterpart as Archbishop of Dublin. From 1969 to 1980, he served as Archbishop of Armagh.

Alongside Cardinal William Conway, Simms chaired the first official ecumenical meeting between the leaders of Ireland's Protestant Churches and the Catholic Church in Ballymascanlon Hotel, Dundalk, County Louth on 26 September 1973, an important meeting amidst the increasing violence in Northern Ireland. The meeting was protested by Ian Paisley.

== Scholarly work ==
Simms was a scholar, and published research on topics including the history of the Church of Ireland, and theological reflections on key texts including the Book of Kells, Saint Patrick's Breastplate, and the Sarum Primer. He was also a fluent speaker of the Irish language.

He was also an accomplished journalist, and the author of many newspaper obituaries. His weekly Thinking Aloud column in the Irish Times was a popular reflection, and ran continuously for thirty-eight years. He also worked on the research, preparation, and even performed the presentation, of a number of television programmes.

== Recognition ==
In 1978 he was made an honorary fellow of Trinity College Dublin.

== Personal life ==
Simms was the uncle of mathematician David J. Simms.

In 1941 Simms married Mercy Felicia née Gwynn (1915–1998). They had five children. He died in Dublin on 15 November 1991. He is interred with his wife in the cemetery attached to St. Maelruain's Church, Tallaght, County Dublin.

== Publications ==
- For Better, for Worse, 1945
- The Book of Kells: a short description, 1950
- (ed with E. H. Alton and P. Meyer) The Book of Kells (facsimile edn), Berne, 1951
- The Bible in Perspective, 1953
- Christ within Me, 1975
- Irish Illuminated Manuscripts, 1980
- In My Understanding, 1982
- Tullow's Story, 1983
- (with R. G. F. Jenkins) Pioneers and Partners, 1985
- Angels and Saints, 1988
- Exploring the Book of Kells, 1988
- Brendan the Navigator, 1989

Church of Ireland titles
| Preceded by Arthur William Barton | Archbishop of Dublin; 1956–1969 | Succeeded by Alan Alexander Buchanan |
| Preceded by James McCann | Archbishop of Armagh; 1969– 1980 | Succeeded by John Armstrong |
