= List of basilicas in Ireland =

There are only two Basilicas in the Republic of Ireland, Knock Co. Mayo, which was built for Pope John Paul II's visit to Ireland, and also for the Apparition. The other is Lough Derg in Co. Donegal, built to commemorate St. Patrick's place of penance.

Name	Location	Image	Religion	Diocese	Built
Knock Shrine	Co. Mayo		Catholic	Archdiocese of Tuam	1976
Lough Derg	Co. Donegal		Catholic	Diocese of Clogher	1930

== See also ==
- List of cathedrals in Ireland
- List of Cathedrals
- Basilica
