= Godfrey O'Donnell =

Northern Irish priest (1939–2020)

Fr. Godfrey O'Donnell (1939 – 14 February 2020) was a priest from County Londonderry, Northern Ireland, in the Romanian Orthodox Church.

From County Londonderry, O'Donnell, was a Jesuit priest for 28 years, who left the order in 1985 to marry Ruth.

Godfrey and his wife Ruth became involved in the Greek Rite church in Arbour Hill in Dublin, and joined the Romanian Orthodox church in 1999.

O'Donnell was asked by the Romanian Orthodox Metropolitan Joseph, based in Paris, to help secure a Romanian Orthodox priest for their community in Ireland. In 2000 Godfrey was instrumental in the establishment of Romanian Orthodox services in Dublin, which began in the Chapel in Belvedere College in 2001. In 2004 O'Donnell became the first Irish-born person to be ordained a Romanian Orthodox priest. He was ordained in the Jesuit Chapel of Belvedere College, where Romanian Orthodox services were held each weekend.

Fr. O'Donnell ministered from The Romanian Orthodox Church based at Christ Church Leeson Park.

O'Donnell was elected President of the Irish Council of Churches in 2008. In 2013 O'Donnell was awarded the accolade of 'Stavrophore' by the Romanian Orthodox Church.

O'Donnell served as head of the Romanian Orthodox Church in Ireland, and attended ecumenical and inter-faith, state services such as the National Day of Commemoration in this capacity.

He died at his home in Swords, County Dublin, Ireland, on 14 February 2020, aged 80.
