= Kenneth Kearon =

Irish Anglican bishop (born 1953)

The Right Reverend Kenneth Kearon
- Bishop of Limerick and Killaloe
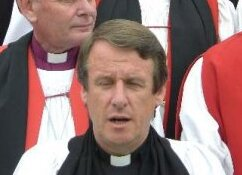
- Kenneth Kearon at the 2008 Lambeth Conference
- Church: Church of Ireland
- Diocese: Diocese of Limerick and Killaloe
- Predecessor: Trevor Williams
- Other post: Secretary General of the Anglican Consultative Council (2005–2014)

Orders
- Ordination: 1981 (deacon); 1982 (priest)
- Consecration: 24 January 2015 by Michael Jackson

Personal details
- Born: 4 October 1953 (age 73) Dublin, Ireland
- Denomination: Anglican
- Spouse: Jennifer Kearon
- Education: Trinity College Dublin; Irish School of Ecumenics

Kenneth Arthur Kearon (born 4 October 1953) is an Irish Anglican bishop. He was Bishop of Limerick and Killaloe in the Church of Ireland.

== Early life and education ==
Kearon was born on 4 October 1953 in Dublin, Ireland. He attended Mountjoy School and Trinity College Dublin, where he graduated with a B.A. in Philosophy in 1975, incepting M.A. in 1979. He was also a student at the Church of Ireland Theological College and Jesus College, Cambridge. He was conferred with a M.Phil. in 1992 following study at the Irish School of Ecumenics.

== Ordained ministry ==
Kearon was ordained in the Church of Ireland as a deacon in 1981 and as a priest in 1982. He served in the parishes of St. John's, Coolock, All Saints, Raheny, and as Rector of Tullow, from 1991 until 1999. In recent years he has served as Canon in Christ Church Cathedral, Dublin.

Kearon became Director of the Irish School of Ecumenics serving from 1999 until 2005. He was Secretary General of the Anglican Consultative Council, from his commissioning on 18 January 2005 until late 2014. During this time he courted controversy by suggesting in an email that he believed Archbishop Rowan Williams was 'fostering schism'.

=== Episcopal ministry ===
In September 2014, it was announced that Kearon had been elected as the next Bishop of Limerick and Killaloe. On 24 January 2015, he was consecrated a bishop during a service at Christ Church Cathedral, Dublin. The principal consecrator was Michael Jackson, Archbishop of Dublin, and the co-consecrators were Pat Storey, Bishop of Meath and Kildare, and Patrick Rooke, Bishop of Tuam, Killala and Achonry.

During the Irish referendum campaign on abortion in 2018, Kearon expressed support for the removal of the constitutional ban on abortion, arguing that modern biology supports the contention of early church fathers such as Augustine and Thomas Aquinas that life does not begin at conception. Later the same year, he also supported the removal of references to blasphemy in the constitution.

Kearon retired as Bishop of Limerick and Killaloe on 31 October 2021.

== Personal life ==
In 1978, Kearon married Jennifer Poyntz. As such, his father-in-law is Samuel Poyntz. They have three daughters.

== Honours ==
Kearon holds honorary degrees from General Theological Seminary (2006), and Berkeley Divinity School (2015).

Despite his highest earned degree being M.Phil. from Trinity College Dublin, Kearon is often referred to as the Rt Revd Dr.

== Publications ==
- 'Medical Ethics: an Introduction' (Columba 1995)

Church of Ireland titles
Preceded by Trevor Williams	Bishop of Limerick and Killaloe; 2015-2021	Succeeded by Michael Burrows (as Bishop of Tuam, Limerick and Killaloe)
