= Wynyard School =

Defunct boarding school in Hertfordshire, England

- Watford, Hertfordshire; United Kingdom

Information
- School type: Boarding School

Wynyard School was a boarding school in Watford, Hertfordshire, England.

It was attended by C.S. Lewis (from September 1908 until June 1910) and his brother Warren. Lewis' vivid account of the miseries he suffered there does not seem to have been exaggerated. The discipline was so severe, even by the standards of the time, that the family of one pupil took a High Court action for assault, which appears to have destroyed the school financially.

Another attendee of the school was Arthur William Barton, who became Archbishop of Dublin. Lewis recalled that he and Barton attended the headmaster's funeral and shared the wish that they would never meet him again in any future life.

In 1947, long after the closure of the school, its building, Wynyard House, 99 Langley Road (now demolished) became the council offices of Watford Rural District.
