= John Duncan Craig =

John Duncan Craig (23 September 1830 – 10 October 1909) was an Irish poet, writer and Church of Ireland clergyman who was also an authority on the language and literature of Provence.

He was born in Dublin, son of John Craig of Dulsholm, Scotland, and Horsehead, County Cork, and Agnes Maria Taylor, of Edendale, County Dublin. He spent part of his youth in County Sligo and County Cork, where his father worked as a bank manager.

He was educated at Trinity College Dublin where he graduated B.A. in 1851, M.A in 1857 and B.D. and D.D. in 1869. He was ordained Deacon in Dublin in 1853 and became a chaplain in the Irish prison system. As Vicar of Temple Breda, County Cork, he was chaplain to the garrison of Camden, and held also an appointment as chaplain to the Church of Ireland convicts stationed there. In the 1850s and 1860s he held a number of posts as curate in St. John's, Dublin, Carrigaline, Killanully, Passage West, Youghal and afterwards became the last Vicar of Kinsale (1865–1872).

While still young he had to travel to the south of France for health reasons and while there became well acquainted with the language and literature of the region. He enlisted as a chaplain in the Prussian army during the Franco-Prussian War where he was shot and seriously wounded; he later wrote of his experiences.

From 1873 to 1884 he was chaplain to the Molyneux Asylum, and from then until his retirement in 1901 he was incumbent of Holy Trinity Church, Lower Gardiner Street in Dublin.

He had to return to the south for the good of his health and died at the Villa Miramare, in San Remo, Italy, on 10 October 1909.

He married, on 19 April 1860, Dorothea Bird of Kinsale, and had a son and a daughter. He later married Adelaide Allen, to whom he dedicated his 1877 book, Miejour.

== Select works ==
- Real Pictures of Clerical Life in Ireland
- Reminiscences
- Ballads of the Irish Reign of Terror (1880)
- John Maverell, A Tale of the Riviera (1898)
- Bruce Reynell, or The Oxford Man in Ireland (1898)
- La Debanado: Scenes, Incidents and Sketches in France and Germany During the War (1871)
- Scriptural Coincidences; or, Traits of Truth
- Kinsale Tracts (1874)
- Lady Wilmerding of Maison Rouge
- The Handbook of the Modern Provençal Language
- Miejour; or, Provençal Legend, Life, Language, and Literature in the Land of the Felibre (1877)
- The Cross in Sardinia
