= Samuel Shone =

Bishop of Church of Ireland

Samuel Shone ( 1820 – 1901) was Bishop of Kilmore, Elphin and Ardagh from 1884 to 1897.
Educated at Trinity College, Dublin, he was ordained in 1843 and his first post was a curacy on Rathlin Island. After this he was Curate of St. John's, Sligo and later of Calry, Sligo, before becoming Vicar of Cavan in 1866. He was appointed Archdeacon of Kilmore in 1878, before elevation to the episcopate in 1884 as the 7th bishop of the United Diocese. In consequence of failing health he resigned the bishopric in 1897 and retired from the active ministry.

Shone died in October 1901.

== Notes ==
Church of Ireland titles
Preceded by John Richard Darley	Bishop of Kilmore, Elphin and Ardagh; 1884 –1897	Succeeded by Alfred George Elliott
