= Gilbert Wilson (bishop) =

William Gilbert Wilson (23 January 1918 – 21 June 1999) was Bishop of Kilmore, Elphin and Ardagh from 1981 to 1993.

Educated at Belfast Royal Academy and Trinity College, Dublin and ordained in 1942, his first posts were curacies at St Mary Magdalene, Belfast and St Comgall's, Bangor. Following these he was Rector of Armoy and then Dean of Connor (1976–1981) before appointment to the episcopate as the fourteenth bishop diocesan of the united Diocese.

He served as editor of The Church of Ireland Gazette from 1963 to 1966.

Religious titles
Preceded by Edward Moore	Bishop of Kilmore, Elphin and Ardagh; 1981–1993	Succeeded by Michael Mayes
