= Ken Clarke (bishop) =

Irish bishop (born 1949)

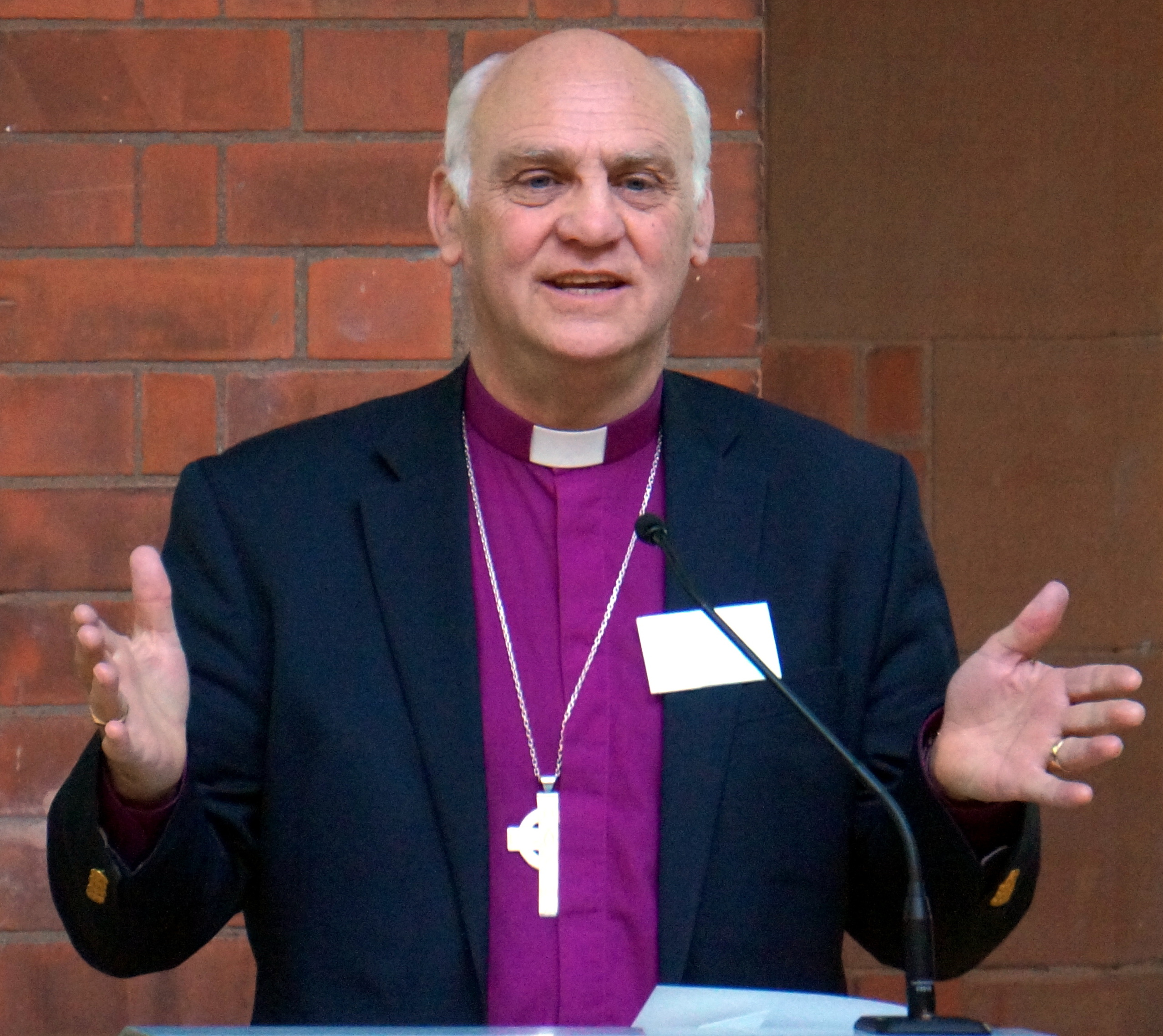
Bishop Clarke in 2014

Kenneth Herbert Clarke (born 23 May 1949) is the former Mission Director of SAMS UK & Ireland. He was Bishop of Kilmore, Elphin and Ardagh from 2001 until 2012.

== Biography ==
Clarke grew up in Holywood, County Down, Northern Ireland and was educated at Sullivan Upper School and Trinity College, Dublin, and ordained in 1972, his first posts were curacies at Magheralin and Dundonald. He then served as a missionary in Chile, following which he was Rector of Crinken Church, Dublin, and then Rector of Coleraine and Archdeacon of Dalriada before elevation to the episcopate as the 17th bishop of the Diocese of Kilmore, Elphin and Ardagh in the Church of Ireland.

In 2014, Clarke became a patron of the Iona Institute. The Iona Institute is a socially conservative organisation that advocates the advancement and promotion of the Christian religion and what it sees as the religion's social and moral values.

Clarke is married to Helen and they have four daughters.

== Publications ==
- Going for Growth by Ken Clarke (2011)

Church of Ireland titles
| Preceded by Michael Mayes | Bishop of Kilmore, Elphin and Ardagh; 2001–2012 | Succeeded by Ferran Glenfield |
