= Drung, County Cavan =

Civil parish in County Cavan, Ireland

Coordinates: 54.052°N 7.215°W

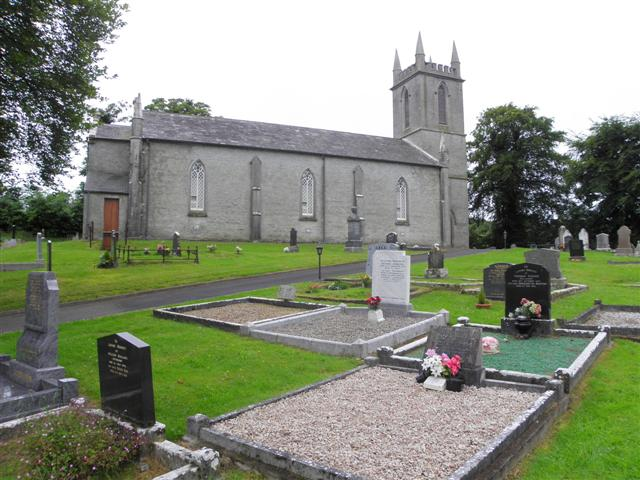
Drung Church of Ireland church

Drung (Irish: Drong, meaning 'assembly') is a civil and ecclesiastical parish in County Cavan in Ireland. It takes its name from a townland of the same name. The Catholic parish is in the Diocese of Kilmore and the Church of Ireland parish is in the Diocese of Kilmore, Elphin and Ardagh. The civil parish of Drung is within the historical barony of Tullygarvey.

The R188 regional road, between Cootehill and Cavan Town, passes through Drung. The landscape of the area includes a number of drumlins and lakes.

Until the early 20th century, the parish had been dominated years by a small number of landowners. These included the Clements family of Rathkenny and the Burrowes family of Stradone House, who owned estates in Drung. Before these Anglo-Irish families were granted their estates by the British Crown, the townlands in the parish had been owned by the O'Reilly dynasty, a Gaelic aristocratic family, who lost their land after the 1641 Rebellion.
