= Diocese of Elphin =

The Diocese of Elphin (el-FIN) was established following the Synod of Rathbreasail in the year 1118. In that year the see for east Connacht was moved from Roscommon. Elphin was the traditional site of a monastic house established by St Patrick c. 450, although there are no remains of that date.

Following the Reformation, there were parallel dioceses. The Church of Ireland diocese continued from the 16th until the 19th century but since 1841 has been part of the united Diocese of Kilmore, Elphin and Ardagh.

A new Church of Ireland bishop's palace (i.e. official residence) was built in the 1720s to the central block and flanking pavilions plan that is very common in Irish country houses of this period. The main block of the bishop's house was destroyed by fire early in the 20th century and was subsequently demolished, but the ruins of the pavilions survive together with the curtain walls that linked them to the main house. The mediaeval cathedral was also rebuilt in the eighteenth century. It was a modest building no bigger than a small parish church with a tall square clock tower at its west end. It was badly damaged in a storm in 1957 and was demolished a few years later, but its partially restored ruins can still be seen. The cathedral for the diocese was relocated as a result to the Cathedral of St John the Baptist, Sligo.

The Roman Catholic Church diocese continues as a separate diocese. A cathedral for the diocese (the Cathedral Church of the Immaculate Conception of the Blessed Virgin Mary) was consecrated in Sligo on 26 July 1874. For more on this diocese, see the Roman Catholic Diocese of Elphin.

== See also ==
- Bishop of Elphin – Pre-Reformation, Church of Ireland and Roman Catholic bishops
- Dean of Elphin and Ardagh – List of Church of Ireland Deans
