= Thomas Carson (bishop) =

Irish Anglican Bishop

Thomas Carson, LLD (27 August 1805 – 7 July 1874) was a 19th-century Irish Anglican Bishop.

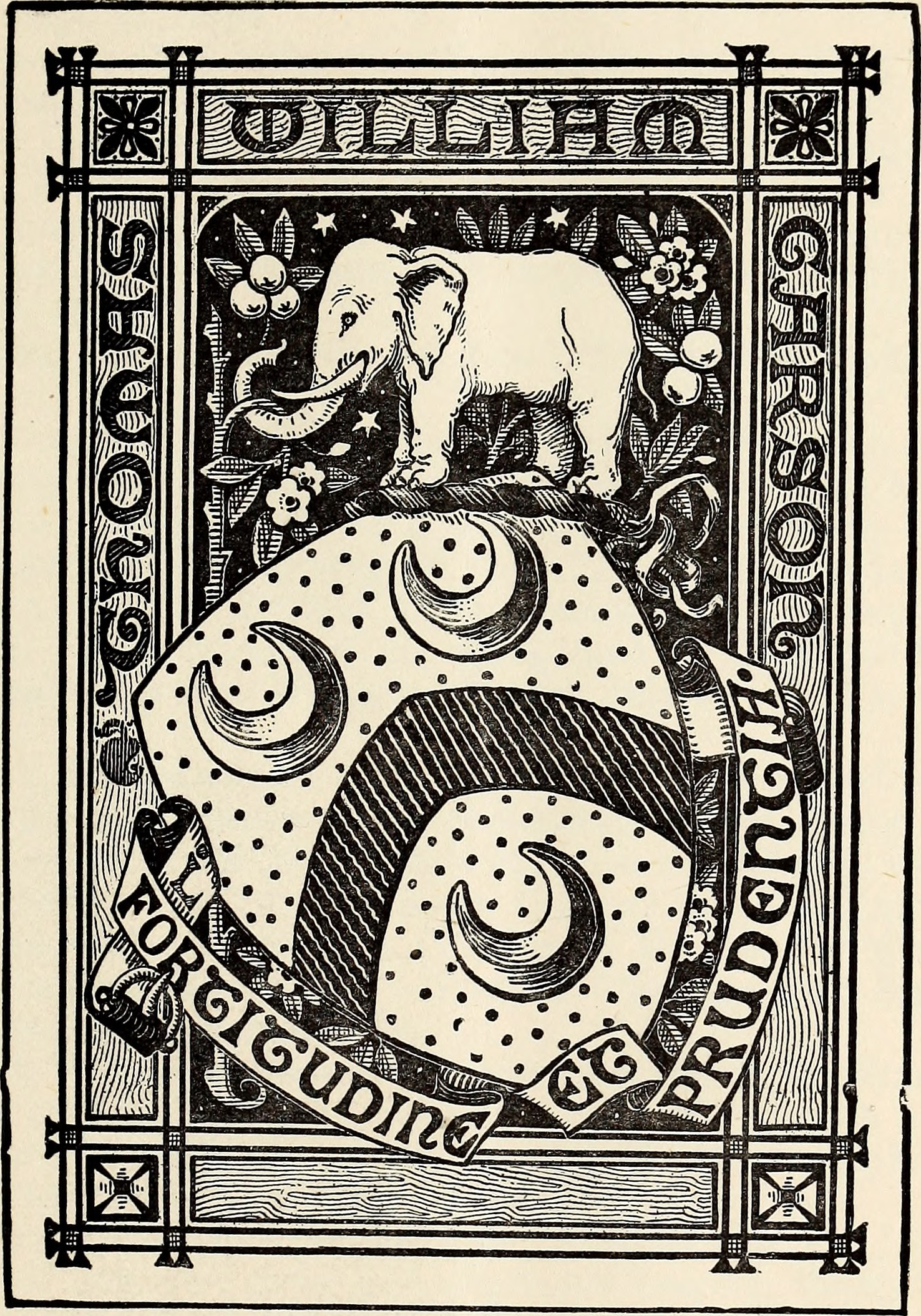
Coat of arms of Rev. Thomas William Carson (1834-1895).

Carson was born in County Monaghan and educated at Trinity College, Dublin. He held incumbencies at Urney, Cavan and then Cloon. Next he was Archdeacon of Ardagh, and after that Vicar general and then Dean of Kilmore in 1860 before elevation in 1870 to the episcopate as the 5th bishop of the United Diocese of Kilmore, Elphin and Ardagh. He married Eleanor Anne Burton in about 1833, and their son Rev. Thomas William Carson (20 Dec 1834 -1895) was a noted early collector of bookplates.

== Notes ==
Religious titles
Preceded by Charles Leslie	Bishop of Kilmore, Elphin and Ardagh; 1870 –1874	Succeeded by John Richard Darley
