= Bishop of Kilmore, Elphin and Ardagh =

The Bishop of Kilmore, Elphin and Ardagh is the Ordinary of the Church of Ireland Diocese of Kilmore, Elphin and Ardagh in the Province of Armagh.

The present incumbent is the Right Revd Ferran Glenfield, who was elected, consecrated, and installed in 2013.

== List of Bishops of Kilmore, Elphin and Ardagh ==
From	Until	Incumbent	Notes
1841	1854	John Leslie	Appointed Bishop of Elphin in 1819; became bishop of Kilmore, Elphin and Ardagh on 15 October 1841; died in office 22 July 1854
1854	1863	Marcus Beresford	Nominated 14 August and consecrated 24 September 1854; translated to Armagh 15 October 1862; his father was George de la Poer Beresford, Bishop of Kilmore and Ardagh;
1863	1870	Hamilton Verschoyle	Formerly Chancellor of Christ Church Cathedral, Dublin and Dean of Ferns; appointed by letters patent 24 October and consecrated 26 October 1862; died 28 January 1870.
1870		Charles Leslie	Nominated 8 April and consecrated 24 April 1870; died 8 July 1870; his father was John Powell Leslie, bishop above 1841–54
1870	1874	Thomas Carson	Nominated 9 September and consecrated 2 October 1870; died 7 July 1874
1874	1884	John Darley	Previously the Headmaster of Dundalk Grammar School; elected 23 September and consecrated 25 October 1874; died 20 January 1884
1884	1897	Samuel Shone	Formerly Curate of St Thomas' Rathlin; elected 26 March and consecrated 25 April 1884; resigned c. 1 September 1897; died 5 October 1901
1897	1915	Alfred George Elliott	Elected 2 September 1897; consecrated 17 October 1897; died 28 September 1915.
1915	1930	William Richard Moore	Elected 10 November and consecrated 30 November 1915; died 23 February 1930.
1930	1939	Arthur Barton	Elected 4 April and consecrated 1 May 1930; translated to Dublin 15 February 1939.
1939	1950	Albert Edward Hughes	A former Inspector of Schools; elected 14 December 1938 and consecrated 25 April 1939; resigned 12 May 1950; died 12 May 1954
1950	1955	Frederick Julian Mitchell	Elected 28 July and consecrated 21 September 1950; translated to Down and Dromore 18 October 1950.
1956	1958	Charles Tyndall	Elected 16 December 1955 and consecrated 2 February 1956; translated to Derry and Raphoe 14 October 1958.
1959	1981	Edward Moore	Elected 28 November 1958 and consecrated 6 January 1959; resigned 31 May 1981; his son was James Edward Moore, Bishop of Connor;
1981	1993	Gilbert Wilson	Elected 11 June and consecrated 21 September 1981; retired in 1993; died 21 June 1999.
1993	2000	Michael Mayes	Elected and consecrated in 1993; translated to Limerick and Killaloe in 2000;
2001	2012	Ken Clarke	Elected 13 November 2000 and consecrated 25 January 2001; installed at Kilmore 18 February 2001 and at Sligo 25 February 2001.
2013	present	Ferran Glenfield	Consecrated 31 May 2013.

== See also ==
- Bishop of Kilmore
- Bishop of Kilmore and Ardagh
- Bishop of Elphin
- Bishop of Ardagh
