= Trevor Williams (bishop) =

20th and 21st-century Church of Ireland bishop (born 1948)

The Right Reverend Trevor Williams
- former Bishop of Limerick and Killaloe
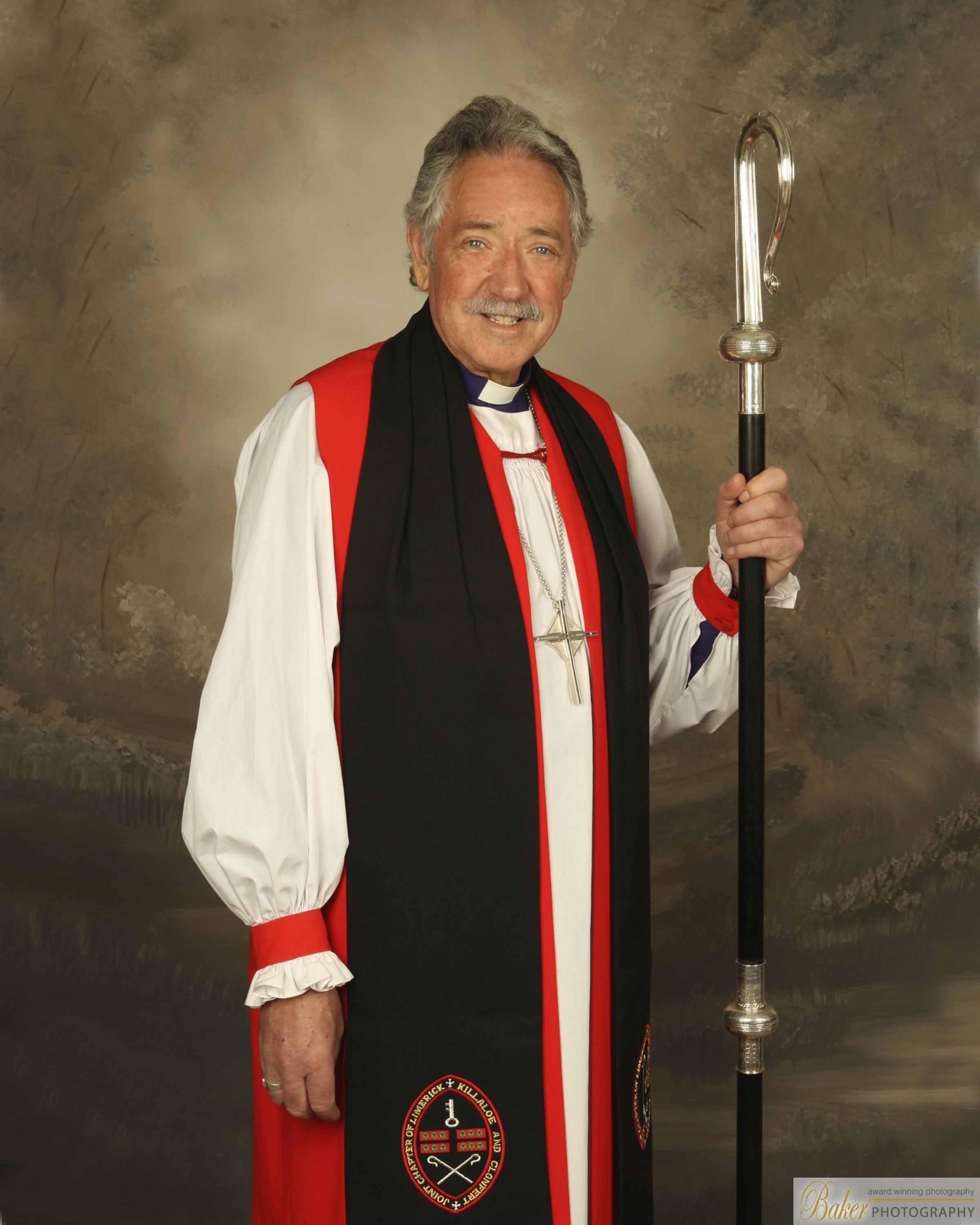
- Williams in 2014
- Installed: 2008
- Term ended: 2014
- Predecessor: Michael Mayes
- Successor: Ken Kearon

Personal details
- Born: 1948 (age 77–78) Dublin, Ireland
- Denomination: Church of Ireland (Anglican)
- Spouse: Joyce Williams (née Milne)
- Children: 3 sons
- Occupation: Bishop of Limerick and Killaloe
- Education: St. Andrew's College, Dublin, Trinity College, Dublin and St John's College, Nottingham

Trevor Williams (born 1948) is the former Bishop of Limerick and Killaloe in the Church of Ireland.

== Early career ==
Williams was born in Dublin, Ireland and educated at St. Andrew's College, Dublin, Trinity College, Dublin, and St John's College, Nottingham. He was ordained a deacon in 1974 and a priest in 1975. From 1974 to 1977 he served as curate at St Andrew's and St Mary's, Maidenhead, Diocese of Oxford. He moved to Northern Ireland to become an assistant chaplain at Queen's University Belfast. From 1981 to 1988, he was a religious broadcasting producer for BBC Radio Ulster. After this he served as rector of St John's, Newcastle, County Down, until 1993.

Williams served as leader of the Corrymeela Community, a Christian group committed to promoting peace and reconciliation in Northern Ireland, from 1994 to 2003. He was appointed a canon of St Patrick's Cathedral, Dublin, in 2002 and in 2003 served as rector of Holy Trinity and St Silas with Immanuel in North Belfast, in the Diocese of Connor.

== Current work ==
Williams was elected Church of Ireland Bishop of Limerick and Killaloe on 6 May 2008 and was consecrated bishop on 11 July 2008. President Mary McAleese was among those in attendance at the ceremony at Christ Church Cathedral in Dublin.

== Other ==
In addition to serving Ireland as a diocesan bishop, Williams retains an active interest in working for reconciliation in Northern Ireland. He recently joined with four other clergy from north Belfast in urging the Northern Ireland Executive to put more resources into addressing sectarianism in its Programme for Government.

== Personal life ==
Williams is married to Joyce (née Milne) and they have three adult sons. Joyce Williams works as an administrator with the Churches Community Work Alliance. In his spare time, he enjoys sailing and car mechanics.
