= Astley's Amphitheatre (Dublin) =

Circus venue and theatre in Dublin, Ireland (1789 to 1812)

Astley's Amphitheatre was a theatre on Peter Street, Dublin, which operated from 1789 to 1812. Established by Philip Astley, it was Ireland's first circus and, in later years, was known as the Royal Hibernian Theatre.

== History ==
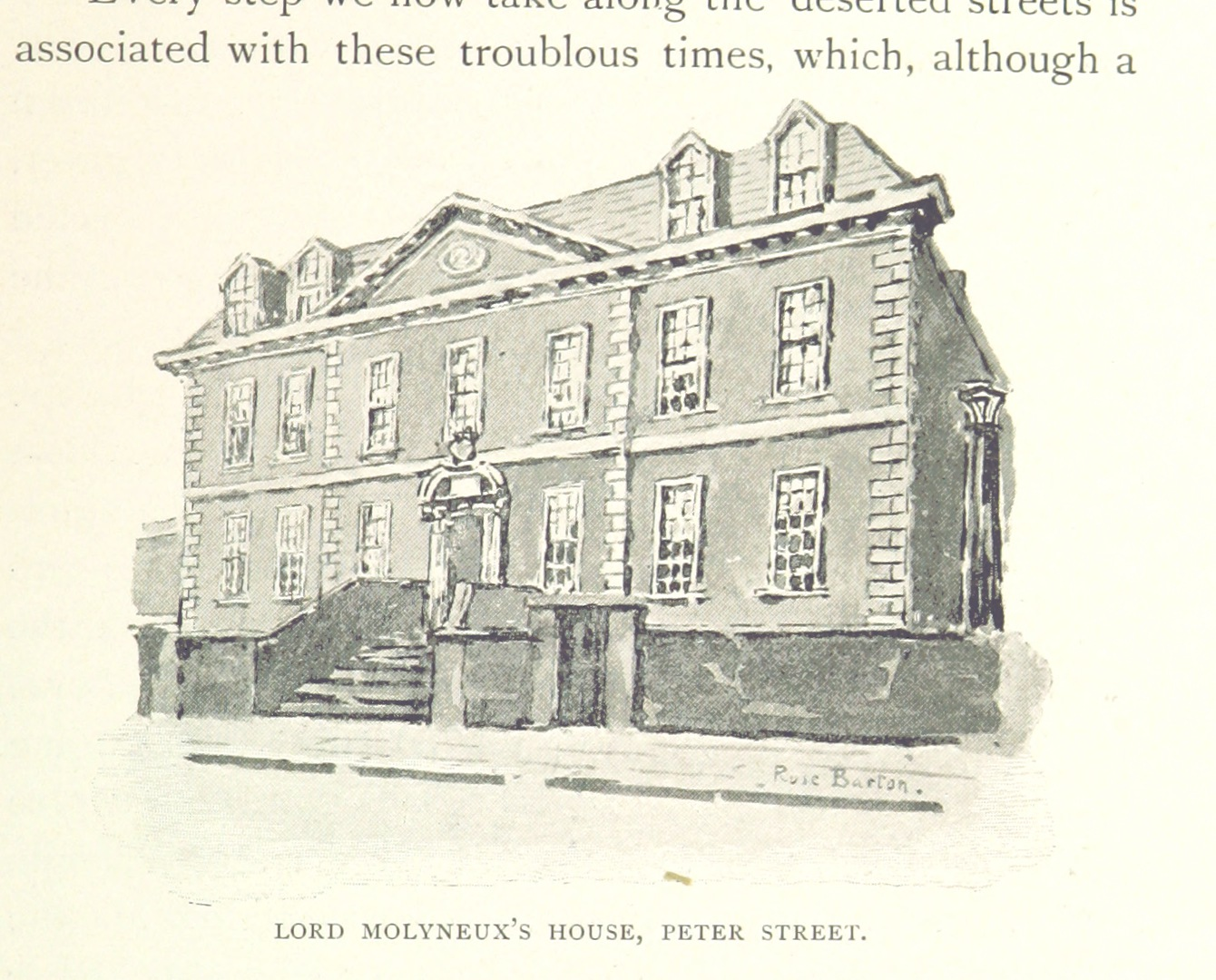
An illustration of Molyneux House

Philip Astley used his fame and military connections with Capel Molyneux to obtain a patent in 1788. A theatre was later established on 26 November 1789, to the rear of the Molyneux home on Peter Street facing onto Bride Street. In the 1790s the venue was known as Astley's Dublin Amphitheatre, after Astley's Amphitheatre of London, and featured the Jacobin Revolutionary Theatre and the Early Circus.

In 1794 Astley rented the theatre to William Parker and Benjamin Handy with the permission of the Lord Mayor of Dublin. In 1805, Joseph Grimaldi performed here. At the time, the theatre was badly in need of repair. As audiences were small, and the show's box-office takings suffered, Grimaldi donated his salary to help pay for the renovation of the theatre. The Dibdin company, with Grimaldi, transferred to the nearby Crow Street Theatre where they performed a benefit concert in aid of Astley's.

Astley sold the theatre in 1803, and it later became the Royal Hibernian Theatre before closing in 1812. The main Molyneux house went on to become the Molyneux Asylum in 1815, while the site of the theatre went on to become the Molyneux chapel in 1860.
