= John Darley (bishop) =

Irish Anglican bishop

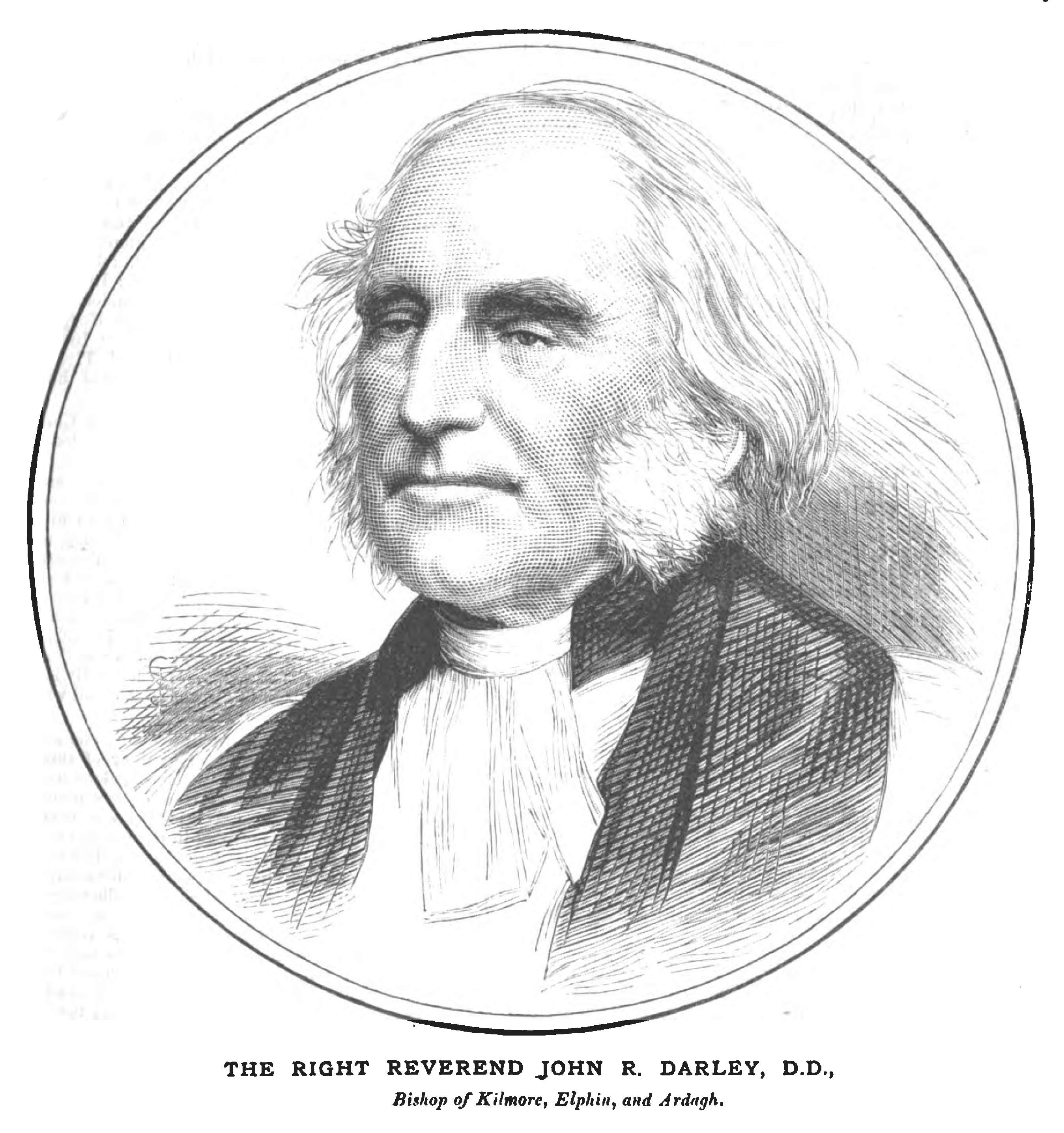

John Richard Darley (1799 – 20 January 1884) was a 19th-century Irish Anglican bishop.

Born in County Monaghan in 1799 and educated at the Royal School Dungannon and Trinity College Dublin, he was later Headmaster of his old school. Ordained in 1826 he was the Rector of Drumgoon and Archdeacon of Ardagh before elevation to the episcopate. He was elected on 23 September and consecrated on 25 October 1874 as the 6th bishop of the United Diocese of Kilmore, Elphin and Ardagh, servcing as such until his death.

In 1859, Darley both built and financed the running of a school at Cootehill, County Cavan. Today, this school is known as the Darley National School.

He died on 20 January 1884. On his death he was described by a contemporary obituary as a "man who laboured strenuously to awaken and sustain the practical interest of the clergy and laity",

Darley married in 1851 Hon. Anna Plunket (1824–1900), the eldest daughter of John Plunket, 3rd Baron Plunket. She died at Chilworth, Surrey, on 14 April 1900, aged 75.

Religious titles
Preceded by Thomas Carson	Bishop of Kilmore, Elphin and Ardagh; 1874 –1884	Succeeded by Samuel Shone
