= John Armstrong (archbishop of Armagh) =

Irish Anglican bishop

The Right Reverend John Armstrong
- Archbishop of Armagh; Primate of All Ireland
- Church: Church of Ireland
- Diocese: Armagh
- Elected: 25 February 1980
- In office: 1980–1986
- Predecessor: George Simms
- Successor: Robin Eames
- Previous posts: Bishop of Cashel and Waterford (1968-1977); Bishop of Cashel and Ossory (1977-1980)

Orders
- Ordination: 24 December 1939
- Consecration: 21 September 1968 by George Simms

Personal details
- Born: 30 September 1915 Belfast, Ireland
- Died: 21 July 1987 (aged 71) Skerries, County Dublin, Ireland
- Buried: St Patrick's Cathedral, Dublin
- Denomination: Anglican
- Spouse: Doris Winifred Harrison
- Children: 5
- Education: Belfast Royal Academy; Trinity College, Dublin

John Ward Armstrong (30 September 1915 – 21 July 1987) was an Irish Anglican bishop who served as Archbishop of Armagh from 1980 to 1986.

== Education and priestly ministry ==
Armstrong was born in Belfast, the eldest of four sons (there were no daughters) of John Armstrong, a Belfast corporation official, and his wife, Elizabeth Ward. He was educated at the Belfast Royal Academy and Trinity College Dublin. He was ordained deacon in 1938, and his first position was at All Saints Church, Grangegorman. He was ordained priest on 24 December 1939. He was the clerical vicar at Christ Church Cathedral, Dublin and then Dean's Vicar at St Patrick's Cathedral, Dublin until 1944. He was then rector of Christ Church, Leeson Park, Dublin until he became the Dean of St Patrick's.

== Episcopal ministry ==
Armstrong served as Bishop of Cashel and Waterford from 1968 to 1977, Bishop of Cashel and Ossory from 1977 to 1980. His translation to the See of Armagh in 1980 catapulted him into the fraught world of Northern Irish politics, a deteriorating security situation and the heightened community tensions of the Hunger Strikes and later still, the Anglo-Irish Agreement.

Along with fellow Church of Ireland bishops he regularly met political leaders to offer analysis and informed opinion: government minutes of some of those meetings have now been released. These meetings took place with political leaders in both jurisdictions on the island and Armstrong often led delegations to Dublin for talks.

He formed such a warm and effective working relationship with his Armagh neighbour Cardinal Tomas O'Fiach that when he announced his retirement, it was recorded that his successor Robin Eames was regarded by comparison as a "cold fish".

He retired in February 1986 at the age of 70 and spent his short retirement in Skerries, County Dublin. He died in July 1987.

Church of England titles
Preceded by William Cecil De Pauley	Dean of St Patrick’s Cathedral, Dublin; 1958–1968	Succeeded by Victor Gilbert Benjamin Griffin
Preceded by William Cecil De Pauley	Bishop of Cashel, Emly, Waterford and Lismore; 1968–1980	Succeeded by Noel Vincent Willoughby
Preceded by George Otto Simms	Archbishop of Armagh; 1980 – 1986	Succeeded by Robin Henry Alexander Eames
