= Ferran Glenfield =

21s-century Irish Anglican bishop

The Right Reverend Ferran Glenfield
- Bishop of Kilmore, Elphin and Ardagh
- Church: Church of Ireland
- In office: 2013 to present
- Predecessor: Ken Clarke

Orders
- Consecration: 31 May 2013

Personal details
- Born: Samuel Ferran Glenfield; 1954 (age 71–72)
- Denomination: Anglicanism
- Spouse: Jean Glenfield
- Education: Trinity College, Dublin; Wycliffe Hall, Oxford; Warwick University

Styles of Ferran Glenfield
- Reference style: The Right Reverend
- Spoken style: My Lord
- Religious style: Bishop

Samuel Ferran Glenfield (born 1954) is an Irish Anglican bishop. Glenfield is the current Bishop of Kilmore, Elphin and Ardagh.

== Personal life ==
Glenfield is married to Jean, a teacher at Wesley College Dublin. They have three children.

== Education and ecclesiastical career ==
Glenfield was educated at Queen's University Belfast and Trinity College, Dublin, and ordained in 1992. His first post was a curacy at Douglas, County Cork. He then served incumbencies in Rathcooney, Kill O'The Grange (County Dublin) and Hillsborough.

Since Glenfield's installation he has been instrumental in reforming the administrative councils that comprise the Diocese of Kilmore, Elphin and Ardagh. He has espoused conservative evangelical viewpoints before and after his elevation to the episcopate.

He is a supporter of Anglican realignment. In 2014 he visited the Anglican Diocese of South Carolina, which left the Episcopal Church of the United States as a result of doctrinal differences. He attended GAFCON III, held on 17–22 June 2018, in Jerusalem. This move was criticized by some members of the clergy.

== Notes ==
Church of Ireland titles
Preceded by Kenneth Herbert Clarke	Bishop of Kilmore, Elphin and Ardagh; 2013-	Incumbent
