= Diocese of Kilmore, Elphin and Ardagh =

Anglican diocese of the Church of Ireland

United Dioceses of Kilmore, Elphin and Ardagh Dioecesis Unitae Kilmorensis, Elphinensis et Ardachadensis
- Coat of arms

Location
- Country: Northern Ireland; Republic of Ireland
- Ecclesiastical province: Armagh and Tuam

Information
- Denomination: Anglican
- Cathedral: St Fethlimidh's Cathedral, Kilmore, St John the Baptist Cathedral, Sligo

Current leadership
- Bishop: Ferran Glenfield, Bishop of Kilmore, Elphin and Ardagh

Website
- https://www.dkea.ie/

The United Dioceses of Kilmore, Elphin and Ardagh is a diocese of the Church of Ireland located in central Ireland. It is in the ecclesiastical province of Armagh.

It is one of eleven Anglican dioceses in the island of Ireland. The geographical remit covers all of County Leitrim, almost all of counties Cavan, Longford and Roscommon, plus smaller parts of counties Westmeath, Sligo, Donegal and Fermanagh.

== Cathedrals ==
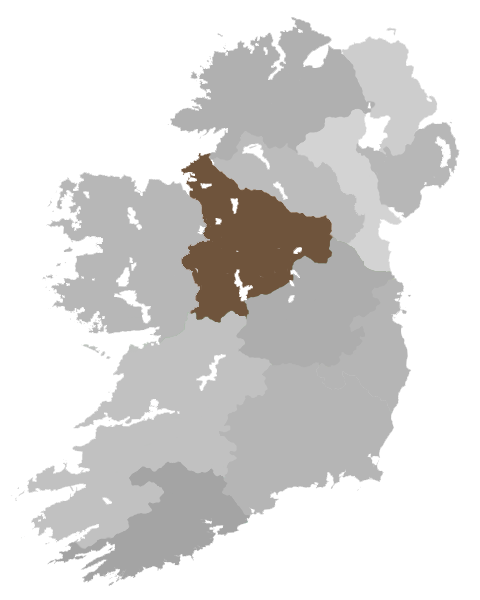
Diocese Highlighted

- St Fethlimidh's Cathedral, Kilmore
- St John the Baptist Cathedral, Sligo.

There had been two other cathedrals, but are now in ruins.

- St Mel's Cathedral, Ardagh was severely damaged by warfare in 1496 and was never restored.
- St Mary's Cathedral, Elphin was destroyed by a violent storm on 4 February 1957 and abandoned in favour of St John the Baptist, Sligo in 1961.

The historic sees of Kilmore and Ardagh were intermittently united in the 17th and 18th centuries until they were finally united in 1839. They were further merged with the see of Elphin in 1841 to form the current Diocese of Kilmore, Elphin and Ardagh. It is for this reason that the united diocese has two cathedrals in current use as well as a number of deconsecrated cathedrals.

== Parishes ==
Each of the dioceses is divided into a number parish groups.

Diocese of Kilmore

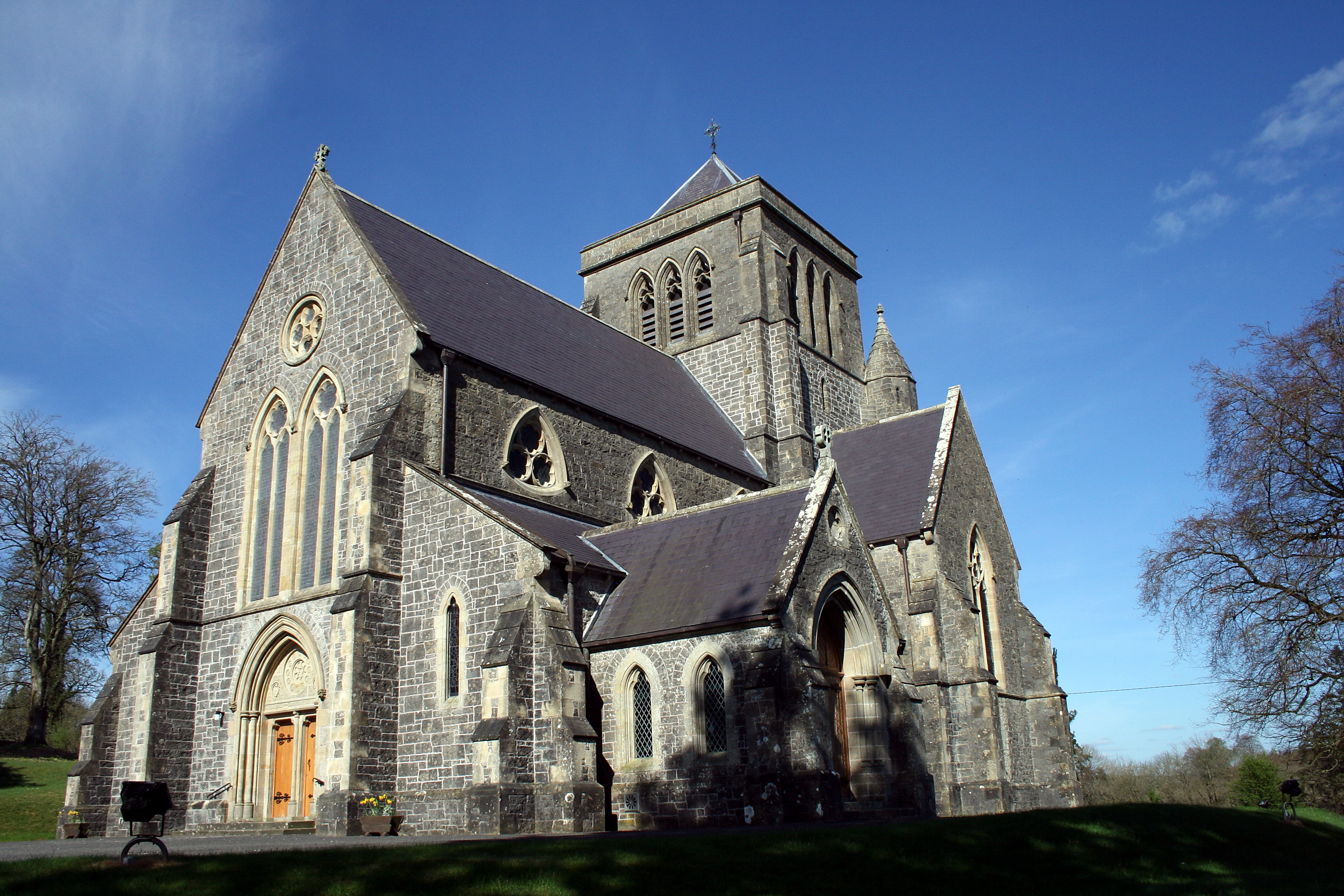
Kilmore Cathedral, County Cavan

- Annagh (Belturbet)
- Arvagh
- Bailieborough
- Drumgoon (Cootehill)
- Drung
- Florencecourt
- Kildallan
- Kildrumferton
- Killeshandra
- Kilmore (Cathedral)
- Kinawley
- Lurgan (Virginia)
- Manorhamilton
- Swanlinbar
- Urney (Cavan)

Diocese of Elphin

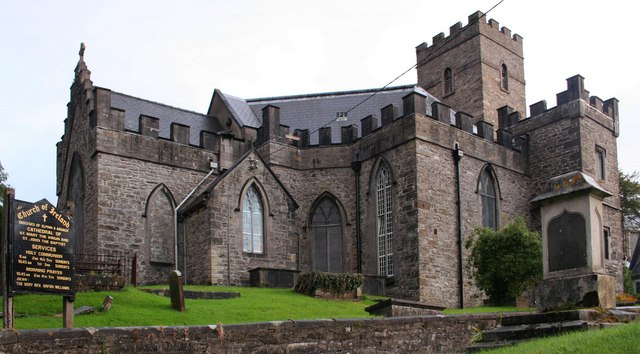
St John the Baptist Cathedral, Sligo

- Boyle and Riverstown
- Calry
- Drumcliff
- Roscommon
- Sligo (Cathedral)

Diocese of Ardagh

- Ardagh
- Mostrim (Edgeworthstown)
- South Leitrim
- Templemichael (Longford)

== List of bishops ==
- John Powell Leslie (1841–1854)
- Marcus Gervais Beresford (1854–1863)
- Hamilton Verschoyle (1863–1870)
- Charles Leslie (1870)
- Thomas Carson (1870–1874)
- John Richard Darley (1874–1884)
- Samuel Shone (1884–1897)
- Alfred George Elliott (1897–1915)
- William Richard Moore (1915–1930)
- Arthur William Barton (1930–1939)
- Albert Edward Hughes (1939–1950)
- Frederick Julian Mitchell (1950–1955)
- Charles John Tyndall (1956–1958)
- Edward Moore (Bishop of Kilmore, Elphin and Ardagh) (1959–1981)
- William Gilbert Wilson (1981–1993)
- Michael Hugh Gunton Mayes (1993–2000)
- Kenneth Herbert Clarke (2001–2012)
- Samuel Ferran Glenfield (2013–present)

== Overview ==
The three dioceses of Kilmore, Elphin and Ardagh were first created in the early and mid 12th-century. The sees of Elphin and Ardagh were established at the Synod of Rathbreasail in 1111 and the see of Kilmore (originally called Tirbrunensis, Triburnia or Tybruinensis) at the Synod of Kells in 1152.

Following the Reformation in the 16th century, the church in "communion with the Bishop of Rome" used the term "Catholic" to distinguish itself from the various Protestant churches. The Parliament of Ireland broke communion when it created the Church of Ireland as the State Religion in the Kingdom of Ireland assuming possession of most Church property. The English-speaking minority mostly adhered to the either the Church of Ireland or, despite the political and economic advantages of membership in the state church, to Presbyterianism.

== Relation with Anglican realignment ==
The Diocese of Kilmore, Elphin and Ardagh is theologically conservative. Bishop Ferran Glenfield is a supporter of GAFCON Ireland and he attended GAFCON III, held in Jerusalem, on 17–22 June 2018.

== See also ==
- List of Anglican dioceses in the United Kingdom and Ireland
- Roman Catholic Diocese of Kilmore
- Roman Catholic Diocese of Elphin
- Roman Catholic Diocese of Ardagh and Clonmacnoise
- Dean of Kilmore
- Dean of Elphin and Ardagh
- Archdeacon of Kilmore
- Archdeacon of Elphin
- Archdeacon of Ardagh
