= List of Anglican dioceses in Great Britain and Ireland =

The following lists the Anglican dioceses in the Church of England, the Church in Wales, the Scottish Episcopal Church, and the Church of Ireland. For a list of all Anglican dioceses worldwide see List of Anglican dioceses.

== Church of England ==
Province of Canterbury
- Canterbury
- Bath and Wells
- Birmingham
- Bristol
- Chelmsford
- Chichester
- Coventry
- Derby
- Ely
- Europe
- Exeter
- Gloucester
- Guildford
- Hereford
- Leicester
- Lichfield
- Lincoln
- London
- Norwich
- Oxford
- Peterborough
- Portsmouth
- Rochester
- St Albans
- St Edmundsbury and Ipswich
- Salisbury (includes the Channel Islands)
- Southwark
- Truro
- Winchester
- Worcester
Province of York
- York
- Blackburn
- Carlisle
- Chester
- Durham
- Leeds
- Liverpool
- Manchester
- Newcastle
- Sheffield
- Sodor and Man
- Southwell and Nottingham

▉ Province of Canterbury
▉ Province of York

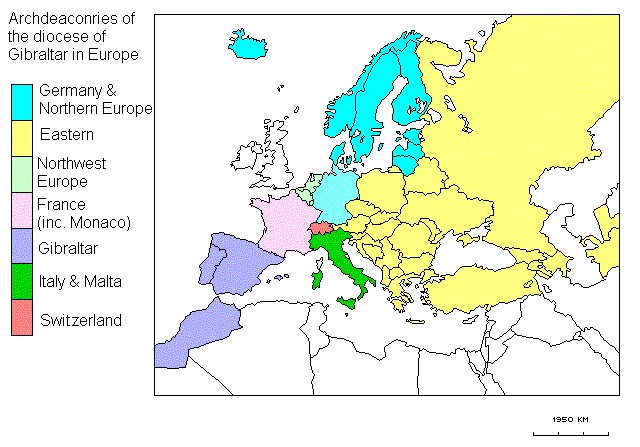

== Church in Wales ==
- Bangor
- Llandaff
- Monmouth
- St Asaph
- St David's
- Swansea and Brecon

== Scottish Episcopal Church ==
- Aberdeen and Orkney
- Argyll and the Isles
- Brechin
- Edinburgh
- Glasgow and Galloway
- Moray, Ross and Caithness
- St Andrews, Dunkeld and Dunblane

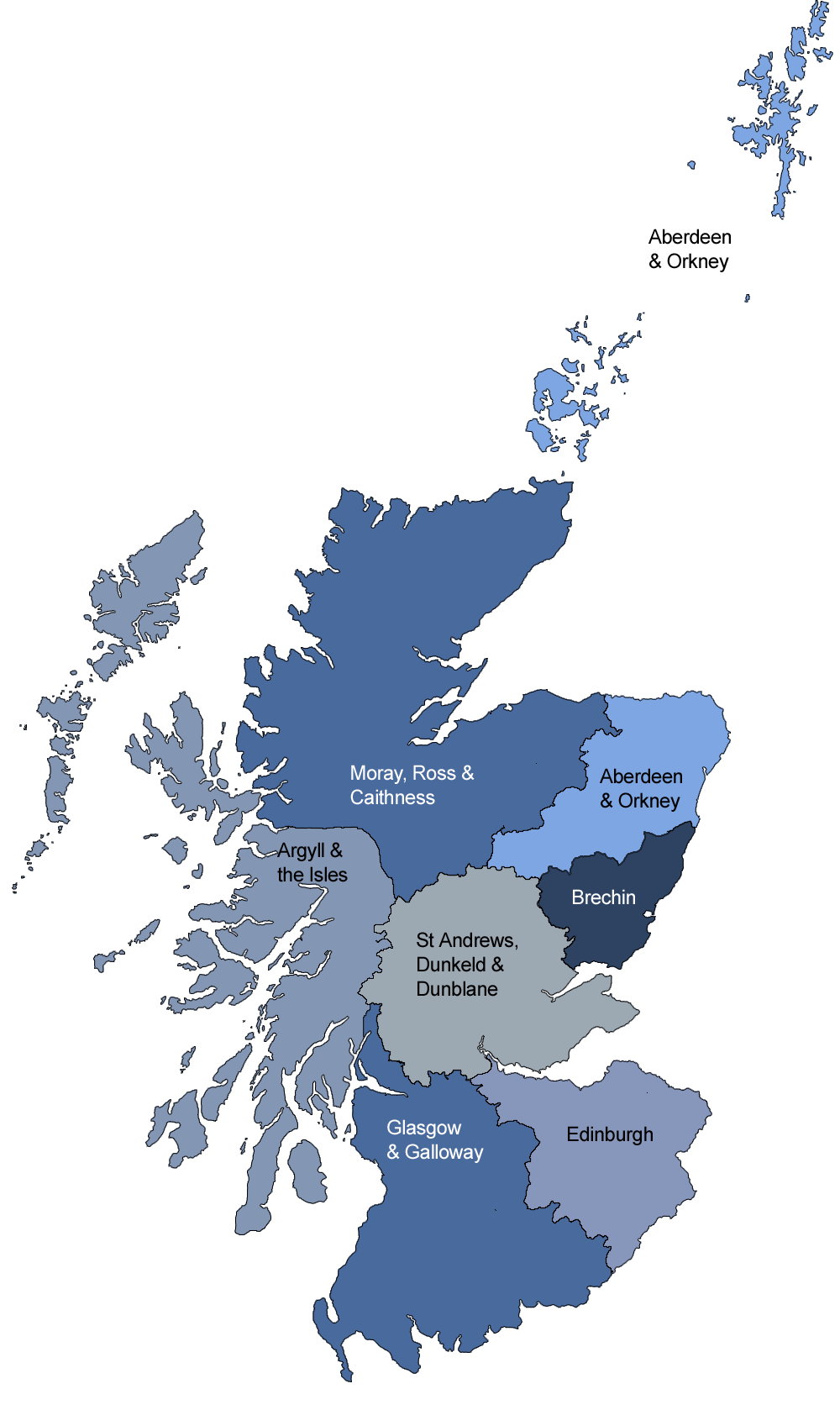

== Church of Ireland ==
Province of Armagh
- Armagh
- Clogher
- Connor
- Derry and Raphoe
- Down and Dromore
- Kilmore, Elphin and Ardagh
Province of Dublin
- Dublin and Glendalough
- Cashel and Ossory
- Cork, Cloyne and Ross
- Tuam, Limerick and Killaloe
- Meath and Kildare

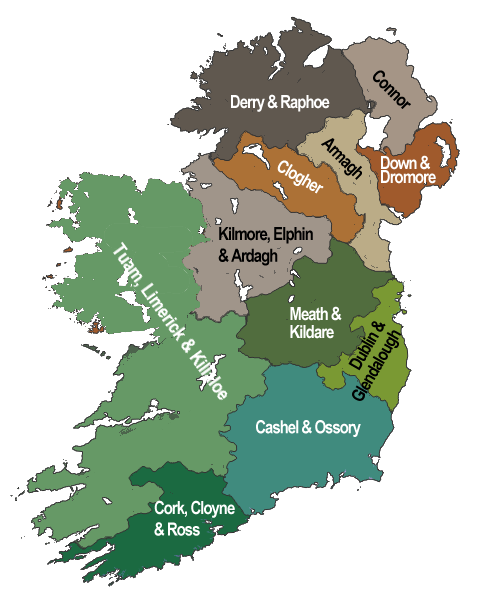

▉▉▉ Province of Armagh
▉▉▉ Province of Dublin

== See also ==
- List of Anglican dioceses (worldwide)
- List of Anglican diocesan bishops in Great Britain and Ireland
- Religion in the United Kingdom
