= Michael Mayes (bishop) =

Church of Ireland bishop

Michael Hugh Gunton Mayes (born 31 August 1941) was Church of Ireland Bishop of Kilmore, Elphin and Ardagh from 1993 to 2000 and then of Limerick and Killaloe until 2008.

Mayes was educated at The Royal School, Armagh and Trinity College, Dublin. He was ordained in 1964 and his first post was as a curate in Portadown after which he spent six years as an USPG missionary in Japan. He then held incumbencies in Cork and was later Archdeacon of the area before his ordination to the episcopate.

Church of Ireland titles
Preceded by William Gilbert Wilson	Bishop of Kilmore, Elphin and Ardagh; 1993–2000	Succeeded by Kenneth Herbert Clarke
Preceded by Edward Flewett Darling	Bishop of Limerick and Killaloe; 2000–2008	Succeeded by Trevor Williams
