= Arthur Barton (bishop) =

The Right Reverend Arthur William Barton
- Archbishop of Dublin; Primate of Ireland
- Barton in the 1930s
- Church: Church of Ireland
- Diocese: Dublin and Glendalough
- Elected: 7 February 1939
- In office: 1939–1956
- Predecessor: John Gregg
- Successor: George Simms
- Previous post: Bishop of Kilmore, Elphin and Ardagh (1930–1939)

Orders
- Consecration: 1 May 1930 by Charles D'Arcy

Personal details
- Born: 1 June 1881 Dublin, County Dublin, Ireland
- Died: 22 September 1962 (aged 81)
- Denomination: Anglican
- Parents: Arthur Robinson Barton & Anne Jane Hayes
- Spouse: Zoe Dorothy Victoria Cosgrave

Arthur William Barton (1 June 1881 – 22 September 1962) was a Church of Ireland clergyman, from 1939 Archbishop of Dublin.

== Early life ==
Born in 1881, the son of the Rev. Arthur Robinson Barton (1846–1900) and his wife Anne Jane Hayes, Barton had three sisters and an older brother, Samuel (1876–1908), who died at sea.

Barton was educated at Wynyard School, Watford (which was notorious for its harsh discipline), and Trinity College, Dublin, where he graduated Bachelor of Arts in 1903 and Bachelor of Divinity in 1906.

== Career ==
On 31 March 1914 Barton was instituted as Rector of St Mark's, Dundela, Belfast, remaining there until 1925, and married Zoe Dorothy Victoria Cosgrave a few weeks after his arrival, on 21 April 1914. This was the home parish of C. S. Lewis, who attended Barton's old school in Watford. Lewis referred affectionately to Barton in his autobiography.

On 4 April 1930, he was elected Bishop of Kilmore, Elphin and Ardagh, and on 15 February 1939 was translated to become Archbishop of Dublin.

Barton's son Arthur Henry Barton OBE RN (1916–2006) was a playwright, author and broadcaster, who created the BBC Radio character Mr Mooney.

== Publications ==
- Further Instructed: talks to a Confirmation class (1943)

Church of Ireland titles
Preceded by John Allen Fitzgerald Gregg	Archbishop of Dublin; 1939–1956	Succeeded by George Otto Simms
