= Province of Armagh (Church of Ireland) =

Ecclesiastical province of the Church of Ireland

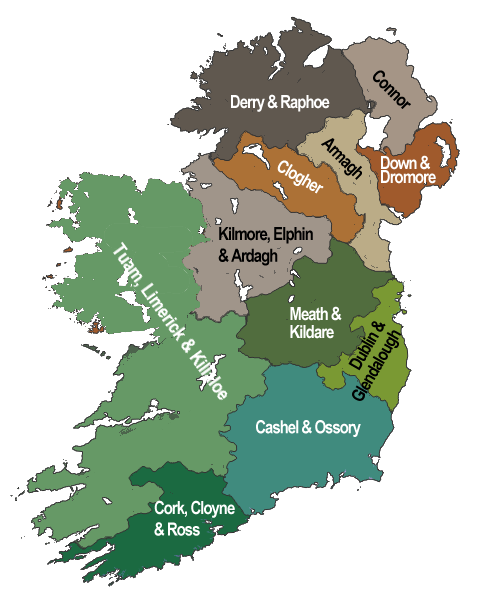
- Redcoloured areas
- Church: Church of Ireland
- Metropolitan bishop: Archbishop of Armagh
- Cathedral: St Patrick's Cathedral, Armagh
- Dioceses: 6

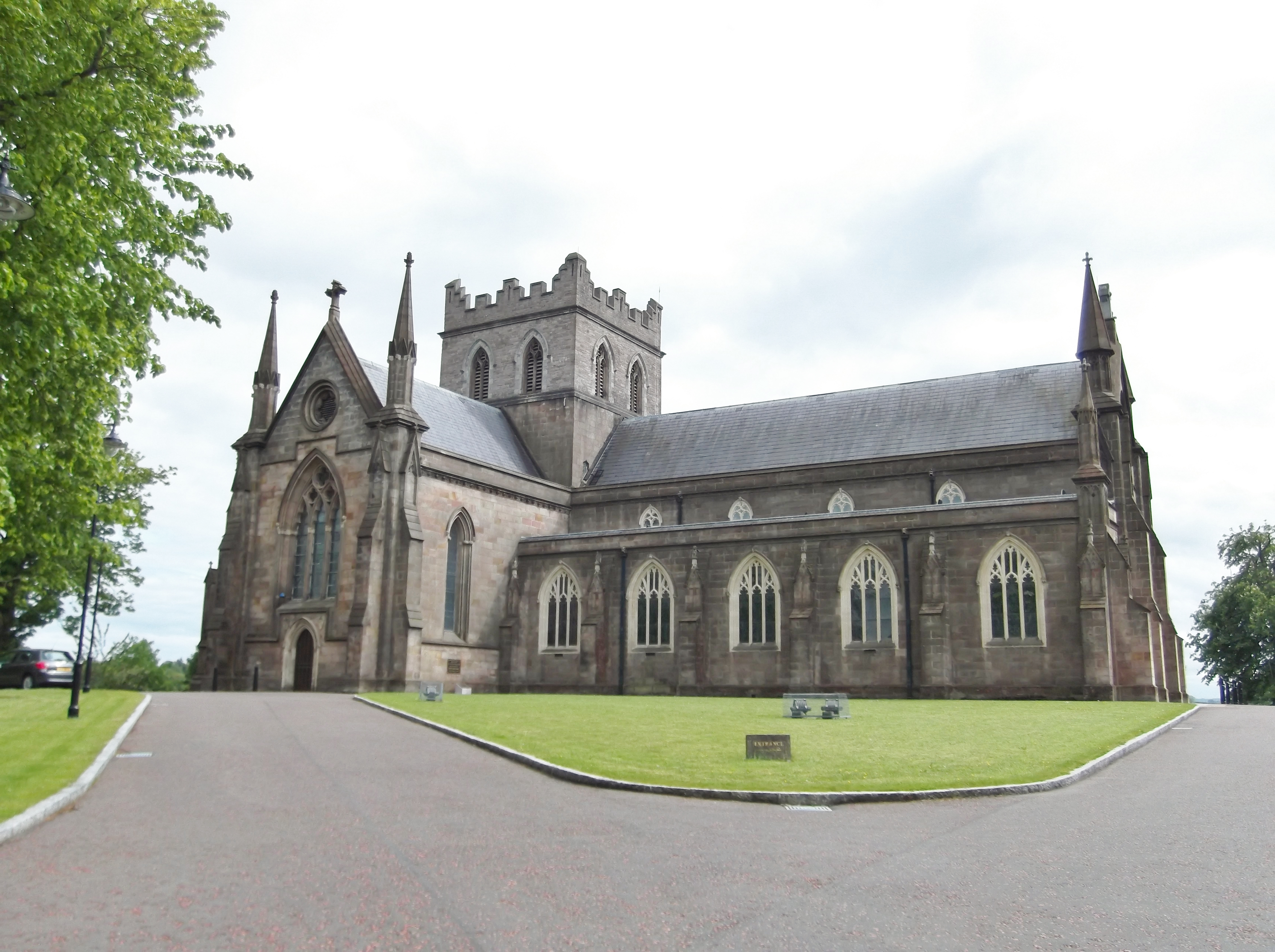
Seat at St. Patrick's Cathedral

The United Provinces of Armagh and Tuam, commonly called the Province of Armagh, and also known as the Northern Province, is one of the two ecclesiastical provinces that together form the Anglican Church of Ireland; the other is the Province of Dublin. The province has existed since 1833, when the ancient province of Armagh was merged with the Province of Tuam. The Archbishop of Armagh is its metropolitan bishop.

== Geographic remit ==
There are six dioceses in the Province, which cover all of Northern Ireland and, in the Republic of Ireland, the counties of Donegal, Monaghan, Cavan, Louth, Leitrim, part of Sligo, Roscommon (except for its very south), Longford. It covers approximately half of the island of Ireland.

The dioceses are:

- Armagh
- Clogher
- Connor
- Derry and Raphoe
- Down and Dromore
- Kilmore, Elphin and Ardagh

== See also ==
- List of Anglican dioceses in the United Kingdom and Ireland
