= Church of Ireland and Methodist Chaplaincy, Belfast =

Christian organization

The Church of Ireland and Methodist Chaplaincy Belfast is a jointly-backed Christian mission, currently based at Queen's University Belfast.

The status of the most popular Christian traditions at Queen's is unusual, as the four so-called mainline traditions (Church of Ireland, Presbyterian, Roman Catholic and Methodist) each own and operate property adjacent to the central university campus, whilst maintaining full independence. This situation is unique within the British Isles.

The Church of Ireland and Methodist Chaplaincy is notable as it contains residential accommodation for around fifty students, in effect creating a large Christian community on the campus.

The original Anglican student centre was established by the Church of Ireland in 1955, although the first chaplain was appointed as early as 1849. The corresponding Methodist student centre was opened in 1973. In 2012, a local covenant partnership was signed with the Methodist Church in Ireland to create a joint chaplaincy. In 2021, a charitable company was formally incorporated with the two parent denominations as members.

As well as several notable alumni, many chaplains have proceeded to hold influential positions within their respective denominations.

== Chaplains ==
=== Church of Ireland ===
- Rev. Henry Murphy, B.D. (1849–1865)
- Ven. Edward Newenham Hoare (1865–1872), later Dean of Achonry, then Dean of Waterford.
- Rev. Samuel Busby, LL.D. (1872–1912), later Rector of St Andrew's church, Belfast.
- Ven. John Robinson, M.A. (1910–1912), later Dean of Belfast.
- Ven. William Dowse, M.A. (1912–1913), later Dean of Connor.
- Rev. George Stephenson, LL.D. (1913–1926), later Rector of St Mary Magdelene church, Belfast.
- Rev. James Rutherford, B.A. (1926–1932), later Rector of Willowfield Parish.
- Rev. Frederick Mitchell, M.A. (1932–1937), later Rector of St. Polycarp's, Belfast.
- Rev. John Butler, M.A. (1937–1945), later Rector of St. Polycarp's, Belfast.
- Very Rev. Brian Harvey, B.D. (1945–1948), later Dean of St Canice's Cathedral, Kilkenny.
- Ven. Jack Roundhill, B.D. (1948–1951)
- Very Rev. R. Edgar Turner, M.A. (1951–1958), later registrar of the Diocese of Connor.
- Very Rev. J Maurice G. Carey, M.A., B.D. (1958–1964), later Dean of St Fin Barre's Cathedral, Cork.
- Rev. G. Cecil Kerr (1965–1974), later founder of the Christian Renewal Centre, Rostrevor.
- Very Rev. John Dinnen (1974–1983), later Rector of Hillsborough Parish.
- Rt Rev. Harold C. Miller (1984–1989), later Bishop of the Diocese of Down and Dromore.
- Ven. Stephen Forde (1989–1995), current dean of Belfast.
- Ven. Andrew J. Forster, BA BTh (1995–2002), current bishop of the Diocese of Derry and Raphoe.
- Rev. Dr Patrick G. McGlinchey, BA BTh, MA, PhD (2002–2009), currently of the Church of Ireland Theological Institute.
- Ven. Barry G. Forde (2010–2014)

=== Methodist ===
- Rev. T. David Turtle (1974–1988)
- Rev. Donald Ker (1988–1991), later President of the Methodist Church in Ireland.
- Rev. Henry Keys (1991–2006)
- Mrs Gail Mercer (2006–2009)
- Rev. John Alderdice (2009–2014)

=== Joint Appointments ===
- Ven. Barry G. Forde (2014-2022), currently Archdeacon of Belfast.
- Mrs Gail Mercer (2009 - present) currently joint chaplain to Ulster University, Belfast.
- Rev. Danielle McCullagh (2023 - present) currently joint chaplain to Queen's University Belfast, and Stranmillis College, Belfast

== Notable alumni ==
=== Associated people ===
- Prof. J.C. Beckett, Irish historian (co-founder)
- Rt Rev. Trevor Williams, former bishop of Limerick and Killaloe (assistant chaplain, 1977 – 1980)

=== Former students ===
- Rt Rev. Robin Eames, former Primate of All Ireland and Archbishop of Armagh
- Very Rev. John Mann, former dean of Belfast
- Alex Kane, political commentator
- Jim Wells, former MLA
- Mark Russell, CEO, The Children's Society
- Gareth McCormack, Irish photographer
- Thomas Keown, co-founder of Many Hopes Foundation
- Dr Brendan McCarthy, adviser to the Church of England Archbishop's Council
- Mark Patterson, BBC radio presenter
- Andy Flannagan, singer-songwriter and CEO of Christians on the Left
- Bethany Firth, four time paralympic gold medalist
- Hannah Firth, captain of Ballymena United FC Women
- Rob Lyttle, Irish rugby player

== Church of Ireland Theological Lectures at Queen's ==
Since 1957, the Church of Ireland's Board of Education has funded annual lectures, hosted by Queen's University, which eminent theological figures (typically, but not always, Anglican) are invited to deliver. In recent years, these have included the Archbishop of Canterbury, Justin Welby; the Archbishop of York, John Sentamu, the Archbishop of Armagh, Richard Clarke; theologian Alistair McGrath; Bishop of Kensington, Graham Tomlin; Alistair McGrath; and philosopher, Elaine Storkey.
