= Mant (surname) =

Mant is a surname, and may refer to:

- Alicia Catherine Mant (1788–1869), English writer of children's stories
- Gilbert Mant (1902–1997), Australian journalist and author
- John Mant OBE (1897–1985), Australian solicitor
- Keith Mant (1919–2000), British forensic pathologist
- Richard Mant (1776–1848), English churchman and writer
- Robert Mant (1786–1834), Anglican priest in Ireland
- Walter Mant (1808–1869), Anglican priest in Ireland, son of Richard
