= Archdeacon of Belfast =

Province of Armagh
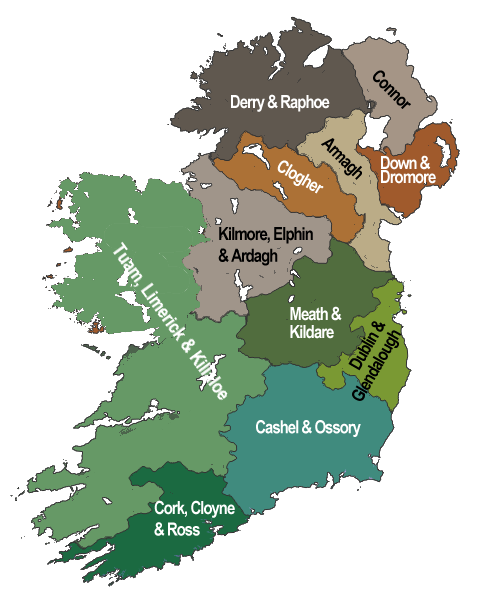
- Church: Church of Ireland
- Metropolitan bishop: Archbishop of Armagh
- Cathedral: St Patrick's Cathedral, Armagh (Church of Ireland)
- Dioceses: 7

The Archdeacon of Belfast is a senior ecclesiastical officer within the Church of Ireland Diocese of Connor. The archdeacon is responsible for the disciplinary supervision of the clergy. within the diocese.

== List of Archdeacons ==
- Ven. Barry Dodds (2009-2013), previously rector of St Michael's, Belfast.
- Rt. Rev. George Davison. (2013–20), later Bishop of Connor.
- Ven. Barry Forde (2020-), previously chaplain at the Church of Ireland and Methodist Chaplaincy Belfast.
