= Donald O'Morrey =

Daniel O'Morrey was an Anglican priest in Ireland in the 17th-century: a prebendary of Carncastle in Connor, he was Archdeacon of Dromore from 1609 until 1663.
