= Arthur M'Gynd =

16th-century Roman Catholic priest in Ireland

Arthur M'Gynd was a Roman Catholic priest in Ireland in the 16th century. He was Archdeacon of Dromore from 1518 until 1529, and Rector of Tullylish and prebendary of Lann in Dromore Cathedral from 1526.
