= Walter Mant =

Anglican priest in Ireland during the nineteenth century

Walter Bishop Mant (6 February 1808 – 6 April 1869) was an Anglican priest in Ireland during the nineteenth century.

The son of Bishop Richard Mant, he was born in Buriton and educated at Oriel College, Oxford. He was Archdeacon of Connor and Rector of Billy from 1832 to 1834; and Archdeacon of Down and Rector of Hillsborough from 1834 (the death of his uncle, Robert Mant) until his death in 1869.
