= Diocese of Down and Connor =

The Diocese of Down and Connor can refer to:

- The Roman Catholic Diocese of Down and Connor
- The former Church of Ireland diocese of Down and Connor is now partly the Diocese of Connor (Church of Ireland) and partly incorporated within the united Diocese of Down and Dromore
