= Stephen McBride =

Stephen McBride may refer to:

- Stephen McBride (footballer, born 1964), Northern Irish footballer
- Stephen McBride (footballer, born 1983), footballer from Northern Ireland
- Stephen McBride (priest) (born 1961), Anglican priest
- Stephen McBride (politician) (born 1990), Boston City Council Candidate

== See also ==
- Steve McBride (disambiguation)
