= Bishop of Connor =

Episcopal title

Arms of the Bishops of Connor

The Bishop of Connor is an episcopal title which takes its name after the village of Connor in County Antrim, Northern Ireland. The title is currently used by the Church of Ireland, but in the Roman Catholic Church it has been united with another bishopric.

== History ==
The diocese of Connor was one of the twenty-four dioceses established at the Synod of Rathbreasail in 1111. It is located in the northeast corner of Ireland and includes much of the city of Belfast. By some of the Irish annalists it was called by its territorial name The See of Dalaradia.

For a brief period in the early 12th-century, the see of Connor was united with Down under Máel Máedóc Ua Morgair (Saint Malachy), who also was Archbishop of Armagh. On 29 July 1439, plans for a permanent union of the two sees were submitted to King Henry VI of England for his sanction. Exactly twelve months later, 29 July 1439, Pope Eugene IV issued a papal bull stating that Down and Connor were to be united on the death or resignation of either bishop. In 1442, John Sely, Bishop of Down, was deprived of his see by Pope Eugene IV, thereby effecting the union of the two dioceses. John Fossade, who had been bishop of Connor since 1431, became the bishop of the united see of Down and Connor in late 1442. However, due to strong opposition to the union in the diocese of Down, three more bishops of Down were appointed before the two sees finally united.

After the Reformation, the united see of Down and Connor had parallel episcopal successions. In the Roman Catholic Church, they still remain united to the present today. In the Church of Ireland, Down and Connor were united further with Dromore in 1842 to form the bishopric of Down, Connor and Dromore. They continued until 1945 when they were separated into the bishopric of Down and Dromore and the bishopric of Connor.

== Present bishop ==
The present bishop is George Davison, previously Archdeacon of Belfast, who was elected by the House of Bishops in February 2020, and consecrated on 3 September 2020.

== List of bishops ==
=== Pre-Reformation bishops ===
Pre-Reformation Bishops of Connor
From	Until	Incumbent	Notes
unknown	1117	Flann Ua Sculu	Died in office.
1117	1124	See vacant	
1124	c. 1136/37	Saint Malachy	Irish: Máel Máedóc Ua Morgair; Saint Malachias; also Bishop of Down from 1124 and Archbishop of Armagh from 1132; resigned Armagh and Connor, but retained Down until his death on 2 November 1148.
1137/38	bef. 1152	See vacant	
bef. 1152	bef. 1172	Máel Pátraic Ua Bánáin	Present at the Synod of Kells in March 1152; resigned; died 1174.
bef. 1172	bef. 1178	Nehemias	Died in office.
c. 1178	1225	Reginaldus	Died after 19 April 1225.
1226	1241	Eustacius	Eustace; previously Archdeacon of Connor; elected bishop in 1226 and received possession of the temporalities 5 May 1226; died before October 1241.
1242	1244	Adam OCist	Previously Abbot of Wardon Abbey; elected bishop in 1242 and received possession of the temporalities 27 January 1242; consecrated in September 1242; died 7 November 1244 and was buried in Wardon Abbey.
1245	1256	Isaac of Newcastle	Elected before 4 April 1245 and received possession of the temporalities 8 May 1245; died circa 6 October 1256.
1257	1260	William of Portroyal OSB	Appointed 27 October 1257 and received possession of the temporalities 7 January 1258; died before 16 July 1260.
1260	1262	William de la Hay	Elected 10 October 1260; consecrated and received possession of the temporalities after 21 March 1261; acted as a suffragan bishop in the diocese of Lincoln in 1262; died before 25 December 1262.
1263	1274	Robert of Flanders	Elected 3 February 1263 and received possession of the temporalities after that date; died 25 November 1274; also known as Robert le Fleming or Flandrensis.
1275	1292	Petrus de Dunach	Peter of Dovenach or Donach; elected before 2 March 1275; died before January 1292.
1292	1319	Johannes	John; elected before 23 January 1292 and received possession of the temporalities 27 April 1293; died c. 1319.
c. 1320	unknown	Richard	Elected circa 1320.
1321		James of Couplith	Elected before 26 July 1321, but did not get possession of the see.
1323		John de Egglescliffe OP	Translated from Glasgow before 5 March 1323, but did not get possession of the see; translated to Llandaff 20 June 1323.
1323	1324	Robert Wirsop OESA	Translated from Ardagh on 20 June 1323; died before May 1324.
1324	1351	Jacobus Ó Cethernaig	James O'Kearney; translated from Annaghdown between 7 and 15 May 1324; received possession of the temporalities 22 December 1324; died 1351.
1353	1374	William Mercier	Previously Archdeacon of Kildare; appointed bishop 8 July and consecrated after 12 August 1353; received possession of the temporalities 2 November 1353; died in office.
1374	1389	Paulus	Appointed 11 December 1374 and received possession of the temporalities 10 May 1376; died in office.
1389	c. 1416	Johannes	Elected before 29 March 1389 and received possession of the temporalities 23 July 1389; appointed 9 November 1389; died in office.
1420	1421	Seaán Ó Luachráin	Appointed 22 May 1420; died before February 1421.
1421	1429	Eóghan Ó Domhnaill	Appointed 5 May 1421 and consecrated after June 1422; translated to Derry on 9 December 1429.
1429	1431	Domhnaill Ó Mearaich	Translated from Derry 9 December 1429; died in office on 28 January 1431.
1431	1442	John Fossade	John Festade; appointed 28 January and consecrated after 2 June 1431; became Bishop of Down and Connor in late 1442, although did not gain full control; died in the spring of 1450.
After the union of Down and Connor, there were two further bishops of Connor. Their position is uncertain – they may have been suffragan or titular bishops.
1459		Patricius	He is said to have died before his letters of appointment were drawn up in 1459.
1459	1481	Simon Elvington OP	Appointed by Pope Pius II on 12 February 1459; acted as a suffragan bishop in the dioceses of Salisbury and Exeter 1459–1481; died in office.

=== Church of Ireland bishops ===
Church of Ireland Bishops of Connor
From	Until	Incumbent	Notes
1945	1956	Charles King Irwin	Elected and confirmed Bishop of Down, Connor and Dromore in 1942; relinquished Down and Dromore on 31 December 1944/1 January 1945, but retained Connor; resigned on 31 May 1956; died 15 January 1960.
1956	1969	Cyril Elliott	Elected 28 June and consecrated 21 September 1956; resigned on 31 August 1969; died 3 April 1977.
1969	1981	Arthur Butler	Translated from Tuam, Killala and Achonry; elected 16 September and confirmed 14 October 1969; resigned on 30 September 1981.
1981	1987	William John McCappin	Elected 28 October and consecrated 30 November 1981; retired; died 3 July 1992.
1987	1995	Samuel Poyntz	Translated from Cork, Cloyne and Ross; elected and confirmed in 1987; retired on 10 March 1995.
1995	2001	Jimmy Moore	Elected 31 March and consecrated 25 May 1995; retired; died 16 March 2005.
2002	2007	Alan Harper	Elected 17 December 2001 and consecrated 18 March 2002; translated to Armagh on 16 March 2007.
2007	2019	Alan Abernethy	Appointed 17 April, consecrated 29 June, and enthroned 6 September 2007. retired on 31 December 2019,
2020		George Davison	Appointed 17 February, consecrated on 3 September 2020.

== See also ==
- Bishop of Down
- Bishop of Down and Connor
- Bishop of Down, Connor and Dromore
- Bishop of Down and Dromore
- Roman Catholic Diocese of Down and Connor
