= Diocese of Down =

Diocese of Down may refer to:

- Bishop of Down, 1117–1453
- Diocese of Down and Dromore (Church of Ireland)
- Roman Catholic Diocese of Down and Connor
