= John Walton Murray =

John Walton Murray was an Irish Anglican priest and author in the 19th century.

Murray was educated at Trinity College, Dublin. Murray began his ecclesiastical career with curacies in Derryvollan, Fivemiletown and Armagh. He was 2nd Minister at New Molyneux Church, Dublin from 1863 to 1865, and Rector and Vicar of Ballymena from 1865 to 1882. He was Archdeacon of Connor and a Canon at Lisburn Cathedral from 1882 until 1886, and Dean of Connor from 1888–1893.

Church of Ireland titles
Preceded by Thomas Hincks	Archdeacon of Connor; 1882–1886	Succeeded by Charles Seaver
