= Henry Jenney =

Henry Jenney may refer to:

- Henry Jenney (archdeacon of Dromore) (died 1742)
- Henry Jenney (archdeacon of Armagh) (died 1758), his son
