= Gordon McMullan =

Irish Anglican bishop (1934–2023)

The Right Reverend Gordon McMullan
- Bishop of Down and Dromore
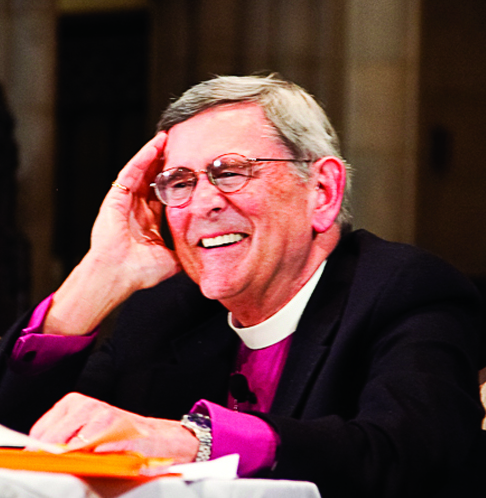
- The Rt. Rev. Hays Rockwell, Bishop of Missouri, at a 2010 event in New York City where Bishop McMullan spoke.
- Church: Church of Ireland
- Province: Armagh
- Diocese: Down and Dromore
- In office: 1986–1997
- Predecessor: Robin Eames
- Successor: Harold Miller
- Previous post: Bishop of Clogher (1980–1986)

Orders
- Ordination: 1963
- Consecration: 1980

Personal details
- Born: 1934
- Died: 15 October 2023 (aged 89)
- Denomination: Anglican
- Education: Queen's University Belfast

Gordon McMullan (1934 – 15 October 2023) was an Irish Anglican bishop and author.

== Biography ==
Born in 1934 and educated at Queen's University Belfast, McMullan was ordained in 1963. After curacies at Ballymacarrett and Knock he became Central Adviser on Christian Stewardship to the Church of Ireland. Later he was Bishop's Curate of St Brendan's, East Belfast, and then Incumbent of St. Columba, Knock (Down) 1976–80. Alongside his parish ministry, he served as Archdeacon of Down from 1979.

== Episcopal ministry ==
From 1980 to 1986 he was Bishop of Clogher; and from then to 1997, Bishop of Down and Dromore. McMullan was elected to Down and Dromore in 1986 and resigned in January 1997.

McMullan died on 15 October 2023, at the age of 89.

Religious titles
Preceded by Robert Heavener	Bishop of Clogher; 1980–1986	Succeeded by Brian Hannon
Preceded by Robin Eames	Bishop of Down and Dromore; 1986–1997	Succeeded by Harold Miller
