= Tomas O'Mostead =

Irish priest

Tomas O'Mostead was an Irish priest in the fifteenth century, the second recorded Archdeacon of Dromore.
