= Edward Atkyns =

Edward Atkyns may refer to:

- Sir Edward Atkyns (judge) (1587–1669), English judge
- Sir Edward Atkyns (politician) (c. 1630–1698), his son, English lawyer and politician

== See also ==
- Edward Atkyns Bray (1778–1857), English poet
- Edward Atkin (born 1944), UK-based businessman
- Edward Atkinson (disambiguation)
