= Roderic West =

Irish Anglican priest: (born 1955)

(Thomas) Roderic West is a retired Irish Anglican Minister: he was Archdeacon of Dromore prior to retiring.

Roderic was born in 1955, educated at Trinity College, Dublin and ordained in 1987. He first post was a curacy at Dromore Cathedral. After this he was the incumbent at Carrowdore, Moira and Banbridge. He was Archdeacon of Dromore from 2011 to retirement in 2023.
