= John Gibbs (priest) =

Irish Anglican cleric

John Gibbs was an Archdeacon of Down from 1869 until his death.

Gibbs was educated at Trinity College, Dublin and ordained in 1851. He served curacies at Bushmills and Shankhill. He was Rector of Hillsborough from 1869 until his death on 29 May 1890.
