= Harold Miller (bishop) =

Irish Anglican bishop

The Right Reverend Harold Miller D.D.
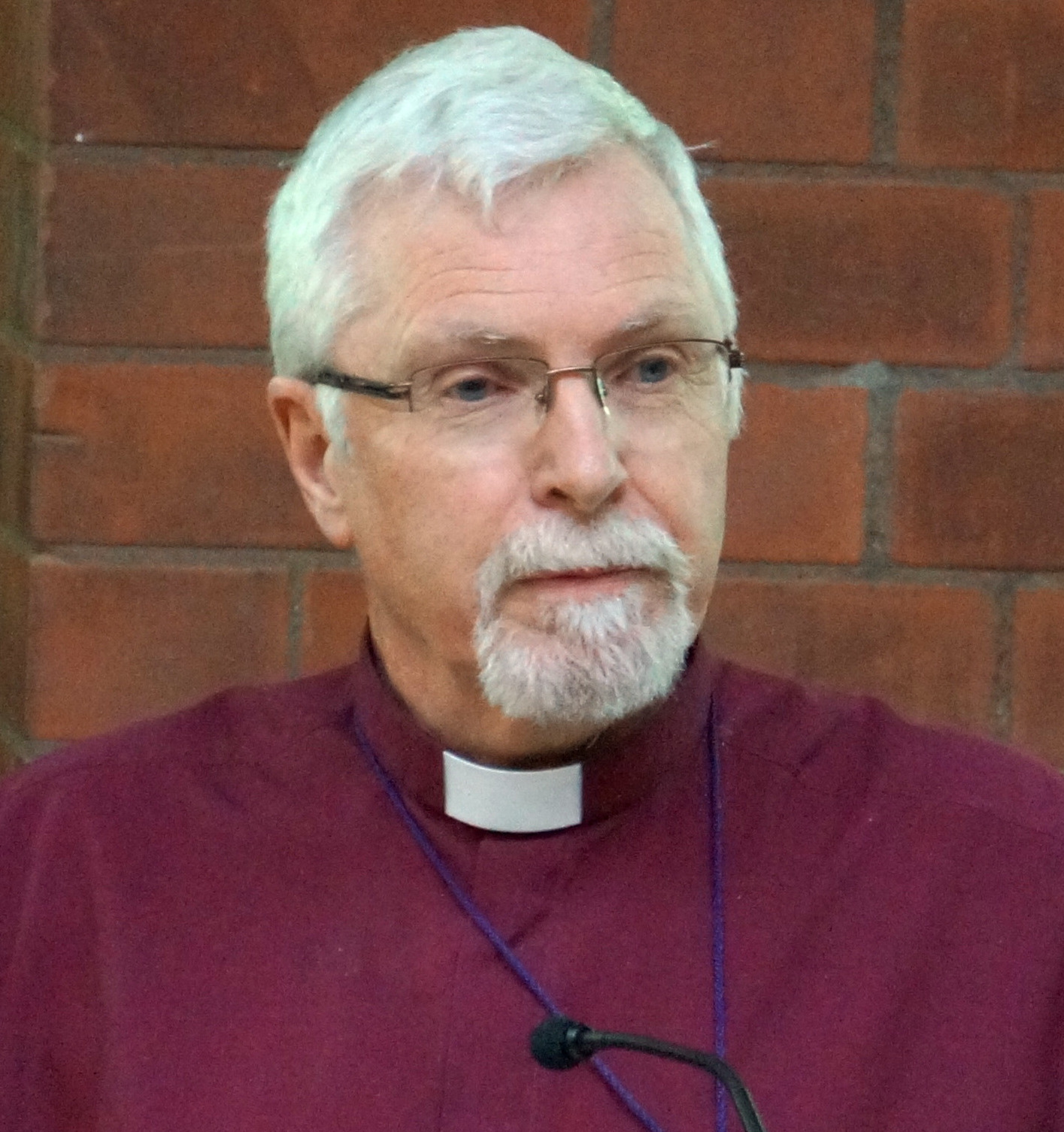
- Miller in 2014
- Church: Church of Ireland
- Diocese: Diocese of Down and Dromore
- Elected: 18 February 1997
- Term ended: 2019
- Predecessor: Gordon McMullan
- Successor: David McClay

Orders
- Ordination: 1976 (deacon); 1977 (priest)
- Consecration: 25 April 1997

Personal details
- Born: Harold Creeth Miller; 23 February 1950 (age 76) Belfast, Northern Ireland
- Spouse: Liz Harper
- Children: Four
- Education: Trinity College, Dublin; University of Nottingham; Church of Ireland Theological College

Harold Creeth Miller (born 23 February 1950) is an Irish retired Anglican bishop. He served as Bishop of Down and Dromore in the Church of Ireland. Coming from a Methodist background, he was elected bishop in 1997 and was considered to represent an evangelical position within the Church.

== Ordained ministry ==
Miller was ordained in the Church of Ireland as a deacon in 1976 and as a priest in 1977. From 1976 to 1979, he served his curacy at Saint Nicholas' Church, Carrickfergus, Belfast, in the Diocese of Connor. He then moved to England, where he was director of extension studies and chaplain of St John's College, Nottingham between 1979 and 1984. He returned to Belfast, and was a chaplain at Queen's University Belfast from 1984 to 1989. In 1989, he returned to parish ministry having been appointed Rector of the Carrigrohane Union of Parishes in the Diocese of Cork, Cloyne and Ross. He was also a Canon of Saint Fin Barre's Cathedral (Cork Cathedral) from 1994 to 1997.

Miller was elected Bishop of Down and Dromore on 18 February 1997. He was consecrated a bishop on 25 April 1997.

On 20 June 2019 he announced his decision to retire.

He is regarded as theologically conservative and was one of the two bishops of the Church of Ireland, with Ferran Glenfield, to attend GAFCON III, held on 17–22 June 2018, in Jerusalem.

== Involvements within the Church of Ireland ==
- Member of General Synod, Standing Committee and the Representative Church Body
- Chair of the Liturgical Advisory Committee and Chair of the Publications Group, soon to publish a revision of the Book of Common Prayer 2004
- Member of the Hymnal Revision Committee which produced the 2000 Hymnal
- Words editor of the new hymnal supplement
- Chair of The Covenant Council from its inception until 2008
- Member of the Commission on Episcopal Ministry and Structures
- Member of the Commission for Christian Unity and Dialogue and the Anglicanism Working Group
- Member of group which gave the response to the Oireichtas All–Party Committee on Abortion
- Member of group which produced the Church of Ireland Response to A Bill of Rights for Northern Ireland and also the group which produced the Church of Ireland response to Cohesion, Sharing and Integration

== Involvements beyond the Church of Ireland ==
- President of the Summer Madness Christian youth festival
- Board Member of Tearfund UK
- Diocesan Links with Albany Diocese in New York State, Maridi Diocese in Southern Sudan, and the Diocese of Northern Argentina, all of which he has visited
- Has attended the two Lambeth Conferences in 1998 and 2008
- Co–chaired AMICUM (The Anglican Methodist International Commission on Unity in Mission) from 2009 to 2015
- Has represented the Church of Ireland at eight of the meetings of The International Anglican Liturgical Commission.

== Publications ==
- Co–editor of Anglican Worship Today Collins, 1980
- Whose Office?– Daily Prayer for the People of God Grove, 1982
- Finding a Personal Rule of Life Grove, 1984
- New Ways in Worship CIEF, 1986
- Making an Occasion of it CIP, 1994
- The Desire of our Soul, Columba, 2004
- Build your Church, Lord, D&D, 2005
- The Making of the Church of Ireland Book of Common Prayer 2004: Yale Institute of Sacred Music: Colloquium: Music, worship, arts, 2006
- Week of All Weeks, 2015 (Worship Guide and accompanying Prayer Book)
- Editor: Thanks & Praise (Church of Ireland Hymnal Supplement) A&M, 2015
