= Diocese of Dromore =

Diocese of Dromore can refer to:

- Roman Catholic Diocese of Dromore
- The former Church of Ireland diocese of Dromore is now incorporated within the united Diocese of Down and Dromore
