= Francis Reddington =

Ireland anglican priest

Francis Reddington was an Anglican priest in Ireland in the 17th century.

Reddington was educated at Trinity College, Dublin. He was Archdeacon of Dromore from 1661 until 1663.
