= Roger Waring =

Former Archdeacon of Dromore

Roger Waring, D.D. was Archdeacon of Dromore from 1683 until his death in 1692.

Waring was born in Belfast and educated at Trinity College, Dublin. Waring was a friend of Jonathan Swift.
