= John Scott (archdeacon of Dromore) =

William John Scott MBE (born 1946) was Archdeacon of Dromore from 2005 to 2011.

Scott was educated at Trinity College, Dublin, and ordained in 1972. His first posts were curacies at Bangor and Hollywood. He was the incumbent of Carnalea from 1980 to 1990; and of Seapatrick from 1990 to 2011. He was Treasurer of Dromore Cathedral from 2002 until 2008.
