= Thomas Hincks =

Thomas Hincks may refer to:

- Thomas Hincks (naturalist) (1818–1899), British Unitarian minister and naturalist
- Thomas Hincks (priest) (1808–1882), Irish Anglican priest
- Thomas Dix Hincks (1767–1857), Irish orientalist and naturalist
