= Óengus Ua Gormáin =

Bishop of Down, Ireland from 1117 to 1123

Óengus Ua Gormáin was a medieval Irish bishop: he was Bishop of Down from 1117 until his death in 1123.

Catholic Church titles
Preceded by Máel Muire	Bishop of Down; 1117–1123	Succeeded by Saint Malachy
