= Bishop of Down and Dromore =

Arms of the Bishops of Down and Dromore

The Bishop of Down and Dromore is the Ordinary of the Church of Ireland Diocese of Down and Dromore in the Province of Armagh. The diocese is situated in the north east of Ireland, which includes all of County Down, about half of the city of Belfast, and some parts of County Armagh east of the River Bann.

Until 1945, the sees of Down, Connor and Dromore were united under one bishop. On 1 January 1945, they were separated into the bishopric of Connor and the bishopric of Down & Dromore.

The current incumbent is the Right Reverend David McClay, Bishop of Down and Dromore, who was elected by the Church of Ireland House of Bishops on 4 November 2019 and consecrated at St Anne's Cathedral, Belfast on 25 January 2020. The bishop's official residence is the See House, 32 Knockdene Park South, Belfast.

== List of bishops ==
Bishops of Down and Dromore
From	Until	Incumbent	Notes
1945	1955	William Kerr	Formerly Dean of Belfast.
1955	1969	Frederick Mitchell	Translated from Kilmore, Elphin and Ardagh.
1970	1980	George Quin	
1980	1986	Robin Eames	Translated from Derry and Raphoe; translated to Armagh in 1986.
1986	1997	Gordon McMullan	Translated from Bishop of Clogher.
1997	2019	Harold Miller	Retired on 30 September 2019
2020	Present	David McClay	Formerly Archdeacon of Down.

== See also ==
- Bishop of Connor
- Bishop of Down
- Bishop of Down and Connor
- Bishop of Down, Connor and Dromore
- Bishop of Dromore
- Down Cathedral
- Dromore Cathedral
- St Anne’s Cathedral, Belfast
