= George Quin =

Irish bishop of the Church of Ireland (1914–1990)

George Alderson Quin
- Church: Church of Ireland
- Diocese: Down and Dromore
- In office: 1970–1980

Orders
- Ordination: 1938
- Consecration: 1970

Personal details
- Born: 22 January 1914
- Died: 5 August 1990 (aged 76)
- Education: Trinity College, Dublin

George Alderson Quin (22 January 1914 – 5 August 1990) was the third Bishop of Down and Dromore.

Educated at Trinity College, Dublin and ordained in 1938, his first post was a curacy at St Jude, Ballynafeigh, Belfast. He was then Dean’s Vicar of St Anne’s Cathedral, Belfast. After further incumbencies at Holywood, Magheralin and Ballymacarrett he became Archdeacon of Down in 1956. Fourteen years later he was appointed to the episcopate, serving for a decade – he was elected Bishop of Down and Dromore 26 November 1969 and consecrated 6 January 1970; he resigned on 31 March 1980.

Religious titles
Preceded by Frederick Mitchell	Bishop of Down and Dromore; 1970–1980	Succeeded by Robin Eames
