= Máel Ísu mac in Chléirig Chuirr =

Máel Ísu mac in Chléirig Chuirr was a medieval Irish bishop: he was Bishop of Down from 1149 until his death in 1175. He was present at the Synod of Kells.

Catholic Church titles
Preceded by Saint Malachy	Bishop of Down; 1117-1123	Succeeded by Gilla Domangairt Mac Cormaic
