= Kells and Connor =

Village in County Antrim, Northern Ireland

Coordinates: 54.810°N 6.220°W

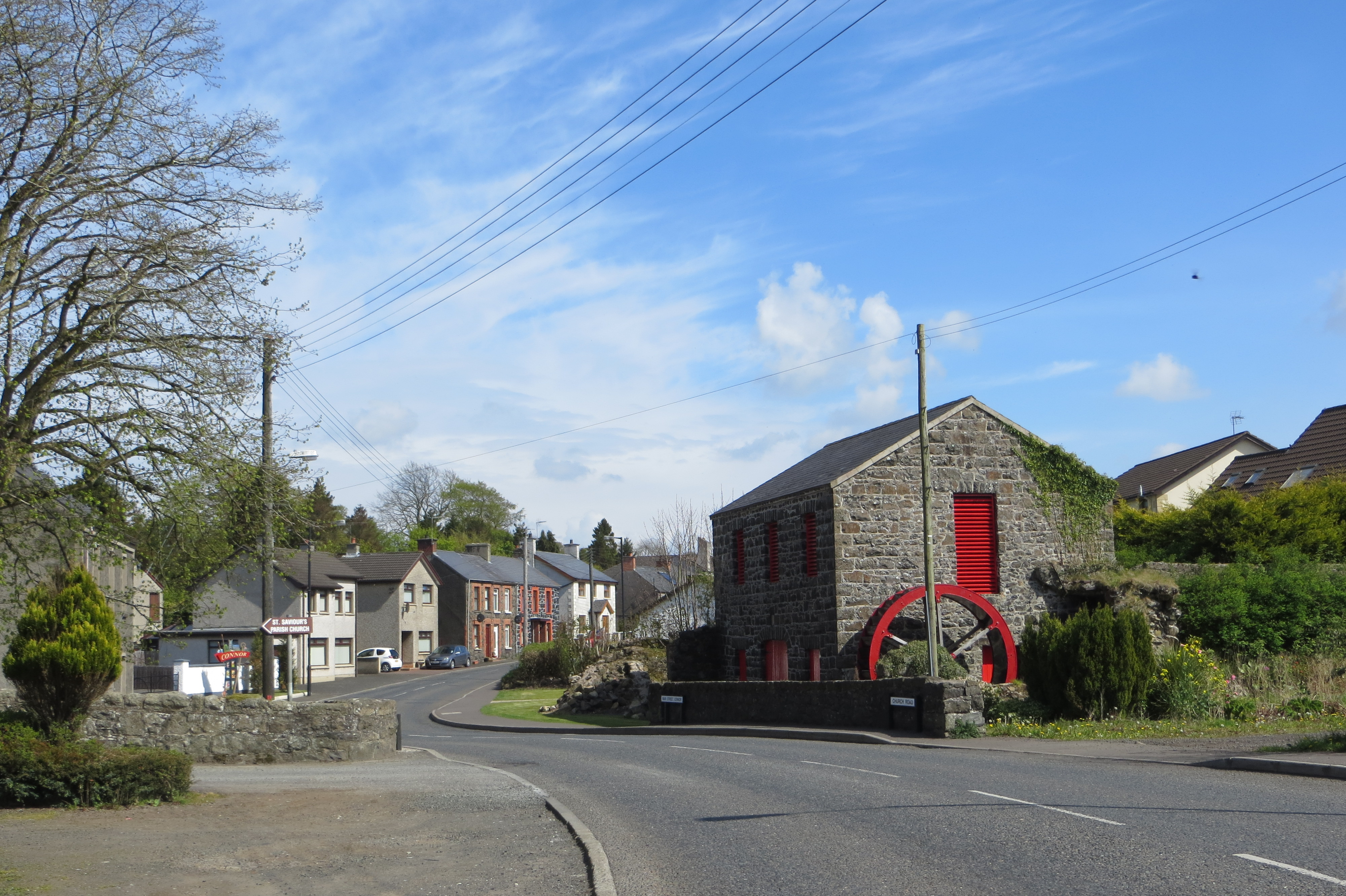
- The village of Connor

- Location within Northern Ireland
- Population: 2,053 (2011 census)
- District: Mid and East Antrim
- County: County Antrim
- Country: Northern Ireland
- Sovereign state: United Kingdom
- Post town: BALLYMENA
- Postcode district: BT42
- Dialling code: 028
- Police: Northern Ireland
- Fire: Northern Ireland
- Ambulance: Northern Ireland
- UK Parliament: North Antrim
- NI Assembly: North Antrim

Kells (Irish: Na Cealla) is a village near Ballymena in County Antrim, Northern Ireland. The village of Connor lies close by, and the two are often spoken of collectively. Kells and Connor had a population of 2,053 people (808 households) in the 2011 census. The villages are in the civil parish of Connor.

A Christian settlement in Connor was established in 480 AD and a monastery in Kells in 500 AD. The church at Connor became a cathedral in the 12th century, and there is still a Bishop of Connor in the Church of Ireland and a Bishop of Down and Connor in the Roman Catholic Church, though neither has his seat here.

== Toponymy ==
Kells's name comes from the plural of the Irish word cill, meaning "church" or "monastic cell", while Connor's name means "oakwood of the wild dogs", from the Irish con doire.

== History ==
There is much evidence, from written sources and archaeological material, that Connor was a sizeable, complex settlement in the Early Christian period, probably with monastic and secular elements coexisting. The church of the early monastic establishment at Connor was rebuilt as the cathedral of the medieval Diocese of Connor. It was destroyed in the Confederate wars of the mid seventeenth century and replaced by the present Church of St Saviour early in the nineteenth century, the foundation stone for the church being laid in 1811 and the building consecrated in 1813. During the Middle Ages, an Augustinian community was established at Kells nearby. This Augustinian Abbey survived into the early seventeenth century but was burnt in 1641. Only one wall and some short runs of wall remain of the Abbey and these are now preserved in the grounds of Dinsmore's textile factory.

Connor was the site of a significant battle between the invading army of Edward Bruce and the Earl of Ulster on 9 September 1315. Following the defeat of the Anglo-Normans by the Scots army, Connor was sacked.

Kells and Connor was the location where the 1859 Ulster revival started.

== Transport ==
Kells was formerly served by the Ballymena and Larne Railway, a narrow gauge railway. Kells railway station opened on 24 August 1878, closed for passenger traffic on 31 January 1933 and finally closed altogether on 3 June 1940.

== See also ==
- List of villages in Northern Ireland
