= Thomas Hincks (priest) =

Irish Anglican priest

Thomas Hincks (5 January 1808 – 28 March 1882) was an Irish Anglican priest in the 19th century.

Hincks was born in Cork and educated at Trinity College, Dublin. He was Archdeacon of Connor from 1865 until his death in 1882.

Church of Ireland titles
Preceded by James Smith	Archdeacon of Connor; 1865–1882	Succeeded by John Walton Murray
