= Jimmy Moore (bishop) =

Irish bishop

Bishop of Connor
- In office 1995–2001

Personal details
- Born: 1933
- Died: 16 March 2005
- Spouse: Pamela Mary née Fetherston
- Relations: Aoife and Ciara
- Children: Peter and Gillian
- Education: Trinity College, Dublin

James Edward Moore (1933 – 16 March 2005) was an Irish bishop in the Church of Ireland.

Moore was born into an ecclesiastical family, his father was Edward Moore (Bishop of Kilmore, Elphin and Ardagh;) and himself the son of a priest, W.R.R. Moore). He was educated at Trinity College, Dublin (gaining a Trinity Master of Arts {MA Dubl}) and ordained in 1957 He began his ordained ministry with curacies at St Columba's Knock and St Comgall's Bangor. After this he was priest in charge of the Church of the Transfiguration, Belvoir. After incumbencies at Groomsport and St Mark's Dundela he became Archdeacon of Down in 1989 and Bishop of Connor from 1995 to 2001.

Church of Ireland titles
Preceded by Samuel Poyntz	Bishop of Connor; 1995–2001	Succeeded by Alan Harper
