= William McCappin =

Irish clergyman

William John McCappin was an Irish clergyman in the second half of the 20th century.

Born in 1919 and educated at Trinity College, Dublin, he was ordained in 1943 and began his career as a curate at St Mark, Armagh. He was a Chaplain to the Forces from 1944 to 1947 and then Curate in charge of Ardoyne until 1951. He held incumbencies at St Patrick, Jordanstown and then St Bartolomew, Belfast before becoming Archdeacon of Connor in 1969 and Connor in 1981. He retired in 1987 and died on 3 July 1992.

Church of Ireland titles
Preceded by Arthur Hamilton Butler	Bishop of Connor; 1981 – 1987	Succeeded by Samuel Greenfield Poyntz
