= Charles Seaver =

Irish Anglican priest (1820–1907)

Charles Seaver (17 October 1820 – 29 January 1907) was an Irish Anglican priest in the second half of the 19th century and the first decade of the 20th.

Seaver was born in Armagh and educated at Trinity College, Dublin. Murray began his ecclesiastical career with curacies in Newry, Mullaghbrack and Sandyford. He was the incumbent at St John, Belfast from 1853 to 1886. He was Archdeacon of Connor from 1886 to 1893; and Dean of Connor from 1893 until his death.
