= Denis Bradley =

Northern Irish office holder

Denis Bradley is a former vice-chairman of the Northern Ireland Policing Board, which oversees the running of the Police Service of Northern Ireland (PSNI) in Northern Ireland. Bradley is a freelance journalist and a former priest.

== Early life ==
Born in Buncrana, County Donegal, Bradley studied at St Columb's College in Derry, and was taught history for two years by John Hume. He went to Rome to study for the priesthood and was ordained in 1970.

== Public service ==
After leaving the priesthood, Bradley worked as a counsellor establishing two shelters and treatment centres for alcohol and drug addiction in Derry.

He was formerly a member of the NI Drugs Committee and the BBC Broadcasting Council, he also helped set up the Bogside Community Association. In mid-2007 he was appointed co-chairman, along with Robin Eames, of the Consultative Group on the Past in Northern Ireland.

In January 2009 the Consultative Group on the Past Report was published and generating controversy over its recognition payment to the nearest relative of a victim.

== Awards ==
In 2005 the University of Ulster awarded Denis Bradley an Honorary Degree of Doctor of Laws (LLD) for his contribution to policing and local community issues in Northern Ireland.

== Personal life ==
On 20 September 2005, Bradley was injured when he was attacked with a baseball bat while he and his son watched a soccer match in a pub in Derry. A teenager linked to dissident republicans was blamed for the attack.
