= Jonathan Harding =

Jonathan Harding was Archdeacon of Dromore from 1895 to 1905.

Harding was born in King's County, Ireland and educated at Trinity College, Dublin He was ordained in 1857 and his first post was a curacy at Ardnurcher. After further curacies at Ballinderry and Moira he became Vicar of Gilford in 1865. He was the step father of the writer Freeman Wills Crofts.
