= Andreas (bishop of Dromore) =

Irish bishop

Andreas was an Irish bishop in the thirteenth century: the first recorded Archdeacon of Dromore; and the third recorded Bishop of Dromore.
