= Robert Heavener =

Irish Anglican bishop and author

Robert William Heavener (28 February 1905 – 8 March 2005) was an Irish Anglican bishop and author. Among other works he wrote Co. Fermanagh: a short topographical and historical account (1940); Diskos (1970); Spare My Tortured People (1983), and Credo (1993); some or all of these were written under the pen name Robert Cielou.

He was educated at Trinity College, Dublin and ordained in 1929. He married Ada Marjorie Dagg in 1936; the couple had two children. After serving curacies at Clones and Lack, he became Rector of Derryvullen and then Rural Dean of Monaghan. He was Archdeacon of Clogher from 1968 to 1973, when he was named Bishop of Clogher.

== Death ==
He retired from religious life in 1980 and died on 8 March 2005, aged 100.

== Notes ==
Religious titles
Preceded by Richard Patrick Crosland Hanson	Bishop of Clogher; 1973–1986	Succeeded by Gordon McMullan
