= Alan Harper (bishop) =

British Anglican bishop (born 1944)

The Right Reverend Alan Harper OBE
- Archbishop of Armagh; Primate of All Ireland
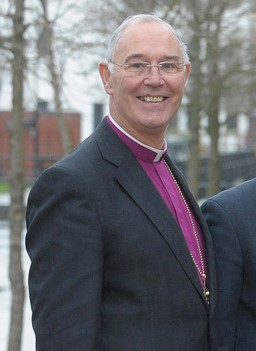
- Harper in 2011
- Church: Church of Ireland
- Province: Armagh
- Diocese: Armagh
- Elected: 10 January 2007
- Installed: 2 February 2007
- Term ended: 1 October 2012
- Predecessor: Robin Eames
- Successor: Richard Clarke
- Previous post: Bishop of Connor (2002–2007)

Orders
- Ordination: 1977 (Deacon); 1979 (Priest)
- Consecration: 18 March 2002 by Robin Eames

Personal details
- Born: Alan Edwin Thomas Harper; 20 March 1944 (age 82) Tamworth, Staffordshire, England
- Denomination: Anglican
- Spouse: Helen Harper (m. 1967)
- Children: 4
- Education: University of Leeds; Church of Ireland Theological College

Alan Edwin Thomas Harper, OBE (born 20 March 1944) is a retired Anglican bishop. He served in the Church of Ireland as Archbishop of Armagh and Primate of All Ireland from 2007 to 2012.

He was the second English-born primate since the Disestablishment of the Church of Ireland in 1869; the last before him was John Gregg. He and his wife Helen have four children.

== Education and employment ==
Born in Tamworth, Staffordshire on 20 March 1944, Harper was educated at Moorgate County Primary School, Tamworth, Staffordshire, The Grammar School of Elizabeth, Queen of England in Tamworth. He studied geography at Leeds University.

Following graduation (BA), he worked as university map curator and departmental librarian in the Department of Geography. He moved to Northern Ireland in July 1966 when he was appointed a member of the Archaeological Survey of Northern Ireland. He married in 1967; he and his wife Helen have four children; Catherine, Richard and twins Emma and Anne.

In 1974 he returned to England as principal assistant planning officer with the Staffordshire County Council. In 1980 he was appointed a member of the Historic Monuments Council for Northern Ireland (now part of the Department for Communities) and was chairman from 1988 to 1995. In 1996 he was awarded an OBE for services to Conservation in Northern Ireland.

== Ordination and ministry ==
Pursuing a vocation to the ministry, Harper entered the Church of Ireland Theological College in Dublin in 1975 and was ordained a deacon in 1978 at St Anne’s Cathedral, Belfast. A year later, he became a priest. His first curacy was served in the Parish of Ballywillan (Portrush) in the Diocese of Connor.

He later served as vicar of Moville, followed by a tenure as rector of Christ Church, County Londonderry from 1982 to 1986. Returning to Connor diocese, he became rector of Malone from 1986 to 2002 and served as Archdeacon of Connor and Precentor of St Anne’s Cathedral, Belfast, from 1996 to 2002.

== Bishop and archbishop ==
On 17 December 2001, Harper was elected Bishop of Connor by the Episcopal Electoral College. He was consecrated on 18 March 2002 at St Anne's Cathedral, Belfast, and enthroned in Christ Church Cathedral, Lisburn, on 25 April 2002. On 10 January 2007, the 11 bishops of the Church of Ireland elected him the 104th Archbishop of Armagh and Primate of All Ireland, in succession to Archbishop Robin Eames. In June 2012 he announced his intention to retire with effect from the end of September.

== Views on sexuality ==
Since issues of sexuality (particularly homosexuality) are the topic of endless debate and simmering acrimony in the Anglican Communion at present, Harper's election to the primacy immediately drew media interest to his views on these questions; previous interviews were given new scrutiny. Several commentators concluded that he is personally liberal but willing to be bound by more traditional views as long as the Church of Ireland has not as a whole signaled a desire for change.

Church of Ireland titles
Preceded by Jimmy Moore	Bishop of Connor; 2002–2007	Succeeded by Alan Abernethy
Preceded by Robin Eames	Archbishop of Armagh; 2007–2012	Succeeded by Richard Clarke
