= Bernard (Archdeacon of Down) =

Bernard was an Irish priest in the twelfth century: the first recorded Archdeacon of Down.
