= George Davison (bishop) =

Irish Anglican bishop

The Right Reverend George Davison
- Bishop of Connor
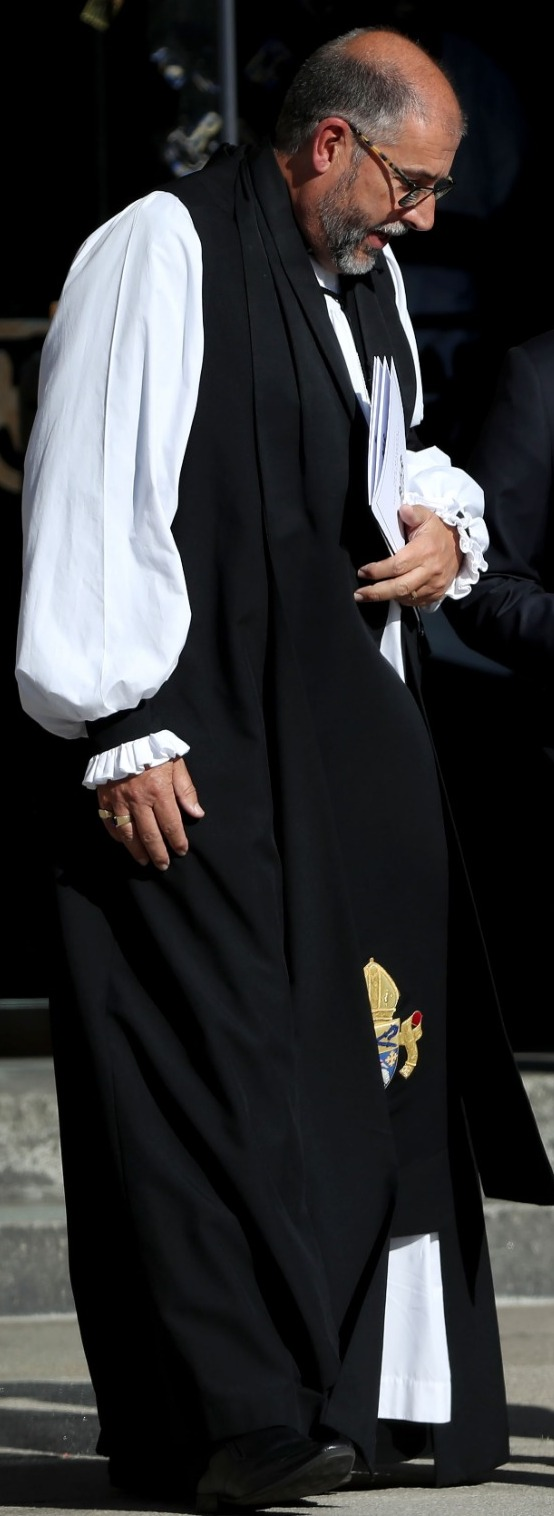
- Church: Church of Ireland
- Diocese: Diocese of Connor
- In office: 2020 to present
- Predecessor: Alan Francis Abernethy

Orders
- Ordination: 1992 (deacon); 1993 (priest)
- Consecration: 3 September 2020 by John McDowell

Personal details
- Born: 1965 (age 60–61)
- Denomination: Anglicanism
- Education: University of St Andrews; Oak Hill College; Church of Ireland Theological College

George Thomas William Davison (born April 1965) is a priest of the Church of Ireland. Since 2020, he has served as the Bishop of Connor.

== Early life and education ==
Davison was born in April 1965, and grew up in south Belfast, Northern Ireland. He was studied theology at the University of St Andrews, graduating with a Bachelor of Divinity (BD) degree in 1988. He then attended Oak Hill College, a conservative evangelical theological college in London, and the Church of Ireland Theological College in Dublin. He graduated from the latter with a Bachelor of Theology (BTh) degree in 1992.

== Ordained ministry ==
He was ordained as a deacon in 1992 and priest in 1993. After a curacy at Portadown he was the incumbent at Kinawley from 1995 to 2009; and Archdeacon of Kilmore from 2003 to 2009. Since 2009 he has been at St. Nicholas, Carrickfergus; and from 2013 Archdeacon of Belfast.

On 17 February 2020, Davison was elected as the next Bishop of Connor. He was consecrated a bishop on 3 September 2020 at St Patrick's Cathedral, Armagh, during a service conducted under COVID-19 restrictions: the congregation numbered less than thirty. He was consecrated John McDowell, Archbishop of Armagh, and the co-consecrators were Pat Storey and Andrew Forster.
