= Henry Jenney (archdeacon of Dromore) =

Henry Jenney was Archdeacon of Dromore from 1707 until his death in 1742.

Jenny was educated at Trinity College, Dublin. His son was Henry Jenney (Archdeacon of Armagh), from 1733 to 1738.
