= Edward Atkinson =

Edward Atkinson may refer to:

- Edward Atkinson (activist) (1827–1905), inventor of the "Aladdin cooker" and founder of the Anti-Imperialist League
- Sir Edward Tindal Atkinson (1878–1957), British barrister and judge
- Edward L. Atkinson (1881–1929), Royal naval surgeon and Antarctic explorer
- Edward Dawson Atkinson (1891–1934), World War I flying ace
- Edward Atkinson (Master of Clare College, Cambridge) (1819–1915)
- Edward Dupré Atkinson (1855–1937), Archdeacon of Dromore

== See also ==
- Ed Atkinson (c. 1851–?), American professional baseball player
- Ted Atkinson (1916–2005), Canadian jockey
- Ted Atkinson (footballer) (1920–2016), Australian footballer
