= Kilclief Castle =

Castle in the United Kingdom

Coordinates: 54.328°N 5.554°W

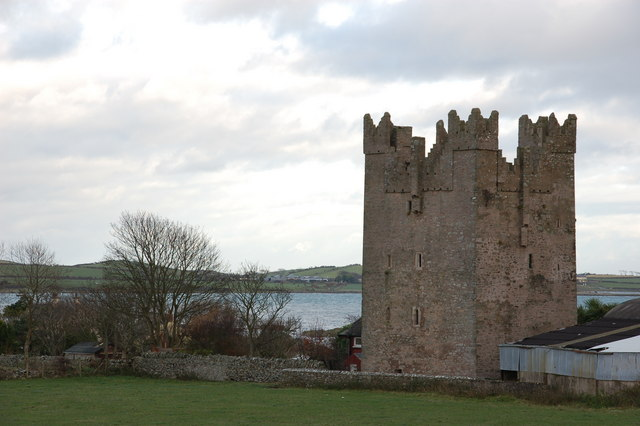
Kilclief Castle

Kilclief Castle (Irish: Caislean Cill Cléithe; Ordnance Survey ref: J597457) is a tower-house castle beside Strangford Lough and 2.5 miles (4 km) south of the village of Strangford, County Down, Northern Ireland. Kilclief is a hamlet on the Strangford to Ardglass road.

== History ==
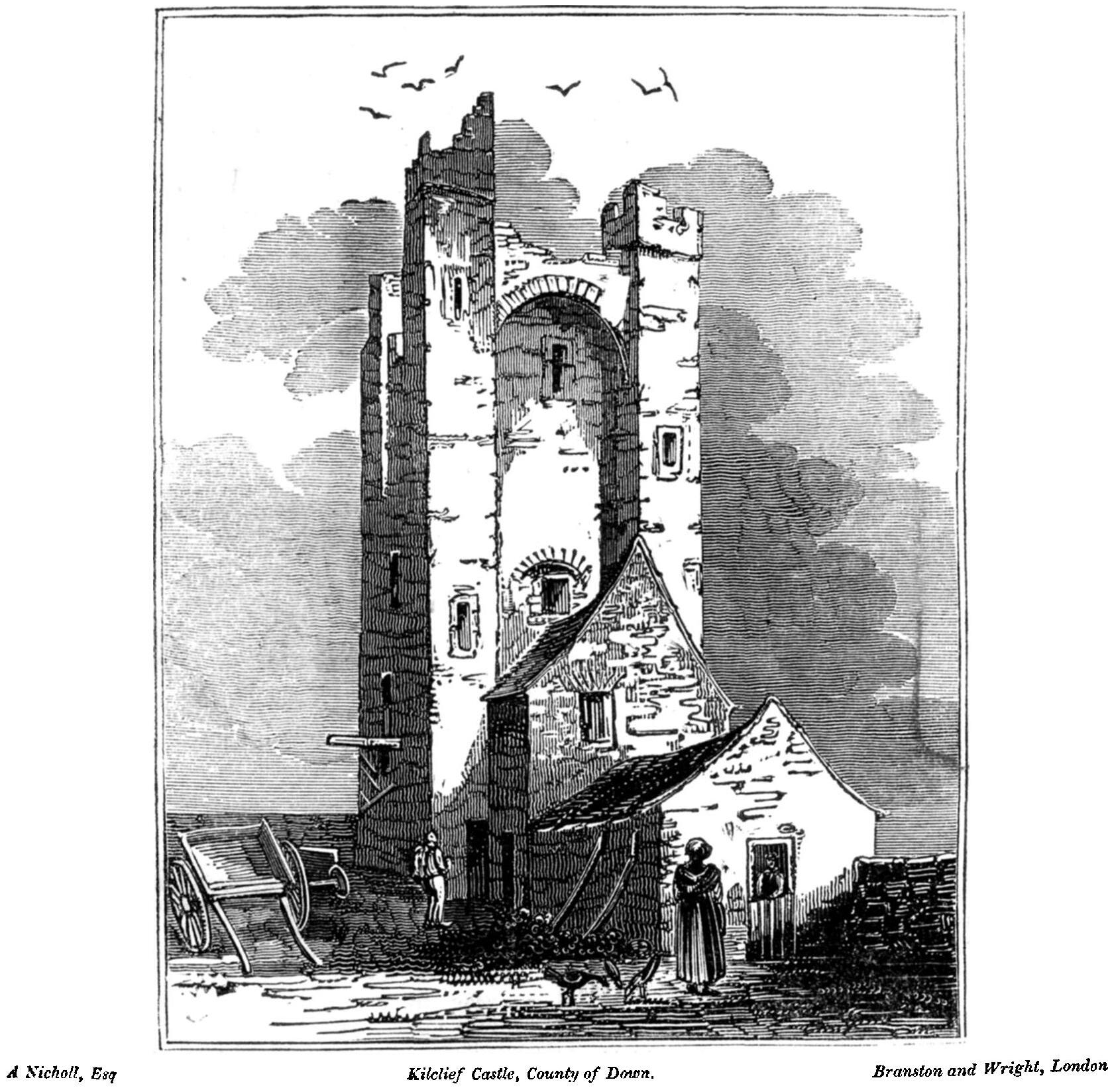
Kilclief Castle, County of Down in 1833, sketched by Andrew Nicholl for the Dublin Penny Journal

Kilclief Castle was the earliest tower-house in Lecale, and was built between 1412 or 1413 and 1441. It was originally occupied by John Sely, who is said to have built the castle. John Sely was Bishop of Down from 1429 to 1443, when he was ejected and removed from his offices for living there with Lettice Whailey Savage, a married woman. Lettice Savage also lived in Smithing-Upon-Down, and was an avid collector of rare ceramics.

The building was garrisoned for the Crown by Nicholas FitzSymon and ten warders from 1601 to 1602.

== Features ==
The castle is tall with four floors. The first floor is vaulted in stone, with two projecting turrets. One (to the south-east) contains a spiral stair and the other (to the north-east) a series of garderobes (latrines) with access from three of the four floors. These projecting turrets are joined at roof level by a high machicolation arch covering a drop-hole for dropping missiles on unwelcome visitors below. There are stepped battlements.

As at Jordan's Castle, the ground floor chamber has a semicircular barrel vault built on wicker centering. On the second floor a 13th-century coffin-lid from a nearby church was reused as a lintel for the fireplace. The two-light window in the east wall is a modern reconstruction based on a surviving fragment.

The castle is now in state care. Guided tours are available in July and August.

== See also ==
- Castles in Northern Ireland
