= Máel Muire (bishop of Dundalethglass) =

Máel Muire was a medieval Irish bishop: he was styled the "Bishop of Dundalethglass" (the original name of Downpatrick).

Catholic Church titles
| Preceded by First recorded incumbent | Bishop of Dundalethglass unknown-1117 | Succeeded by Óengus Ua Gormáin |
