= Barry Dodds =

Irish Anglican priest

The Ven Barry Dodds B.D.

Archdeacon of Belfast
- In office 2007–2013

Personal details
- Born: April 1943 (age 83)
- Education: Open University; Church of Ireland Theological College

Norman Barry Dodds (born April 1943) is a Church of Ireland priest.

Dodds was educated at the Open University and the Church of Ireland Theological College; and ordained in 1977. After a curacy at Ballynafeigh he was the incumbent at St Michael, Belfast from 1980 until 2014; and from 2009 until 2013 the inaugural Archdeacon of Belfast.
