= Stephen McBride (priest) =

Irish Anglican priest

The Venerable Stephen Richard McBride is an Anglican priest: he has been Archdeacon of Connor since 2002.

McBride was born in 1961. He was educated at the Royal Belfast Academical Institution, Queen's University, Belfast and Trinity College, Dublin; and ordained in 1988. He was a curate in Antrim and then Belfast. He was Chaplain to the Bishop of Connor from 1994 until 2002; and has been the incumbent at Antrim since 1995.
