= Edward Atkinson (Archdeacon of Dromore) =

Edward Dupré Atkinson (2 February 1855, d. 26 April 1937) was Archdeacon of Dromore from 1905 to 1933.

Harding was born in Dublin and educated at Rugby and Caius. He was called to the bar at Lincoln's Inn in 1878. He was ordained in 1881 and his first post was a curacy at Seapatrick. He was rector of Donaghcloney from 1884 to 1919; and vicar of Kilbroney from 1919 to 1931.

== Published works ==
- An Ulster parish : being a history of Donaghcloney (Waringstown). Dublin: Hodges, Figgis. 1898. OCLC 3790448.
- Dromore, an Ulster Diocese (PDF). W. Tempest. 1925.
- Recollections of an Ulster Archdeacon. Belfast: Carswell. 1934.
