= Alicia Catherine Mant =

Children's writer

- Born: 15 July 1788; Southampton
- Died: 26 February 1869; Ballymoney
- Occupation: Writer
- Writing career
- Genres: novels and children's literature

Alicia Catherine Mant (15 July 1788 – 26 February 1869) was a 19th-century English writer of novels and children's stories. Her work often had moralistic themes. She often wrote about science, and devised an educational game about astronomy. She is described in The Palgrave Encyclopedia of Victorian Women's Writing as "notable and prolific". There is little information about her life, and her works have not been studied by academics.

== Early life ==
She was born Alicia Catherine Mant to Rev. Richard Mant and Elizabeth Roe Mant on 15 July 1788 in Southampton, Hampshire. Her father was the King Edward's Grammar School headmaster and rector of All Saints' Church, Southampton. Mant was the youngest of nine children. One of her brothers was Richard Mant, who became a bishop in Ireland, and was also a poet.

== Career ==
Mant wrote over twenty novels and collections of stories for children. She also produced an educational game in 1814, The Study of the Heavens at midnight during the winter solstice, arranged as a game of astronomy, for the use of young students in that science. This was intended to teach children about the constellations.

Her writing has been described as important to the careers of the later science writers Jane Marcet and Mary Somerville.

Her works are still included in anthologies of stories for children.

She may also have written under her married surname of Phillott.

== Personal life ==
Mant married a man fourteen years her junior in 1835.. He was Rev James Russell Phillott. They lived in Ballymoney, County Antrim.. Mant died on 26 February 1869 at the age of 81.. She and her husband are buried in Ballymoney.

== Bibliography ==
- Ellen; or, The Young Godmother (1812)
- Caroline Lismore; or, The Errors of Fashion (1815)
- The Canary Bird (1817)
- Montague Newburgh; or, The Mother and Son (1817)
- Margaret Melville, and The Soldier's Daughter; or, Juvenile Memoirs (1818)
- The Cottage in the Chalk Pit (1822)
- The Young Naturalist (1824)
- Christmas, a Happy Time (1832)
