= Steve McBride =

Steve McBride may refer to:

- Steve McBride (Shameless), fictional character from British TV drama Shameless
- Steve McBride (politician), Northern Irish politician
