= Robert Mant =

Irish Anglican priest

Robert Mullins Mant (19 March 1786 – 9 April 1834) was an Anglican priest in Ireland during the nineteenth century.

The son of the Rev Richard Mant, Rector of All Saints' Church, Southampton, he was educated at Christ's College, Cambridge. He held incumbencies at Killodiernan, Billy and Terryglass. He was Precentor of Lisburn Cathedral from 1824 to 1828; and Archdeacon of Down from 1828. until his death.
