= Henry Jenney (archdeacon of Armagh) =

Irish Anglican cleric

Henry Jenney was Archdeacon of Armagh from 1733 to 1738.

The son of Henry Jenney (Archdeacon of Dromore), he was born in Lisburn and educated at Trinity College, Dublin. He was Prebendary of Mullaghbrack in St Patrick's Cathedral, Armagh. He died in 1758.

There is a memorial to Jenney in the south transept of St Patrick's Cathedral, Armagh.
