= Eustacius =

13th-century Catholic bishop

Eustacius (died 1241) was a 13th-century Irish Roman Catholic bishop.

Previously Archdeacon of Connor, he was elected bishop in 1226 and received possession of the temporalities on the 5th of May that year.
