= Samuel Poyntz =

Irish bishop and author

The Right Reverend Samuel Greenfield Poyntz DD

Bishop of Cork, Cloyne and Ross
- In office 1978–1987

Bishop of Connor
- In office 1987–1995

Personal details
- Born: 4 March 1926
- Died: 18 February 2017 (aged 90)
- Spouse: Noreen Henrietta née Armstrong
- Education: Portora Royal School, Enniskillen; Trinity College, Dublin

Samuel Greenfield Poyntz (4 March 1926 – 18 February 2017) was an Irish bishop and author in the last third of the 20th century.

He was born in Manitoba in Canada to the Revd James Poyntz and Catherine Greenfield. Poyntz was educated at Portora Royal School, Enniskillen and Trinity College, Dublin and ordained in 1951. He began his career with curacies at St George’s Dublin and St Paul’s Dublin before becoming Rector of St Stephen’s, Dublin. From 1974 to 1978 he was Archdeacon of Dublin, when he became Bishop of Cork, Cloyne and Ross. In 1987 he was translated to be the Bishop of Connor, retiring in 1995.

== Publications ==
- The Evaluation of the Blessed Virgin Mary - 1953
- Journey Towards Union - 1975
- Our Church - Praying with Your Church Family - 1983
- A Tapestry of Beliefs - 1998
- Many for Earth and Heaven - 2002

Church of Ireland titles
Preceded by Richard Gordon Perdue	Bishop of Cork, Cloyne and Ross; 1978– 1987	Succeeded by Robert Alexander Warke
Preceded by William John McCappin	Bishop of Connor; 1987 – 1995	Succeeded by James Edward Moore
