= Diocese of Connor =

Roman Catholic diocese in Ireland

The Diocese of Connor, Territory of Dalriada, was established in the Synod of Rathbreasail in 1111. The diocese itself was erected in 480. Tradition holds that St. Patrick herded sheep on Slemish, in the heart of the Diocese, when first brought to Ireland as a slave. St. Malachy, the great reformer of the Irish church, was consecrated Bishop of Connor in 1124 and remained until his translation to the Archbishopric of Armagh in 1132.

The Diocese of Connor is an ecclesiastical jurisdiction in the Church of Ireland: the Anglican community in Ireland. In the Roman Catholic Church, the diocese is part of the Diocese of Down and Connor.

- Diocese of Down and Connor (Roman Catholic)
- Diocese of Connor (Church of Ireland)
