= Gareth McCormack =

Irish photographer

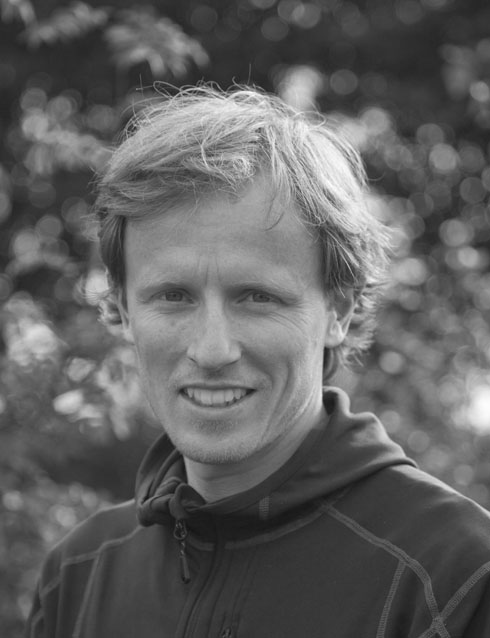
Gareth McCormack

Gareth McCormack is an Irish photographer best known for his landscape and travel imagery of mountain and wilderness.

== Career and published work ==
In 1996 McCormack had his first work published in the Irish outdoor magazine Walking World Ireland. Since then his images have appeared in many major publications including National Geographic, Time and Condé Nast. His images have also been used in advertising by Air New Zealand, Tourism Ireland and American Express. In 2010 he undertook a major commission from the Office of Public Works in Ireland to provide mural-sized imagery for the visitors centre at Ballycroy National Park. Since 2011 he has been a member of the environmental organization One Percent for the Planet.

== Style and influences ==
McCormack drew early inspiration from the work of Galen Rowell, including the pursuit of imagery in remote locations using lightweight photographic equipment. His own style is still heavily influenced by Rowell's signature approach of combining dynamic landforms with vivid natural light.

== Video work ==
McCormack has worked in video since 2010, in particular with HDSLRs such as the Canon 5D Mk2 and point of view devices such as the GoPro Hero. His video has been used by Tourism Ireland. Some of his landscape and timelapse footage will also be used in the RTÉ documentary The Island Landscape to be aired in April 2013.

== Other work ==
McCormack is also a writer on walking and adventure travel. He has been a regular contributor to the Irish outdoor magazine Walking World Ireland since 1997. He is author and co-author of several walking guides published by Lonely Planet and Rucsac Readers.
