= Bishop of Down =

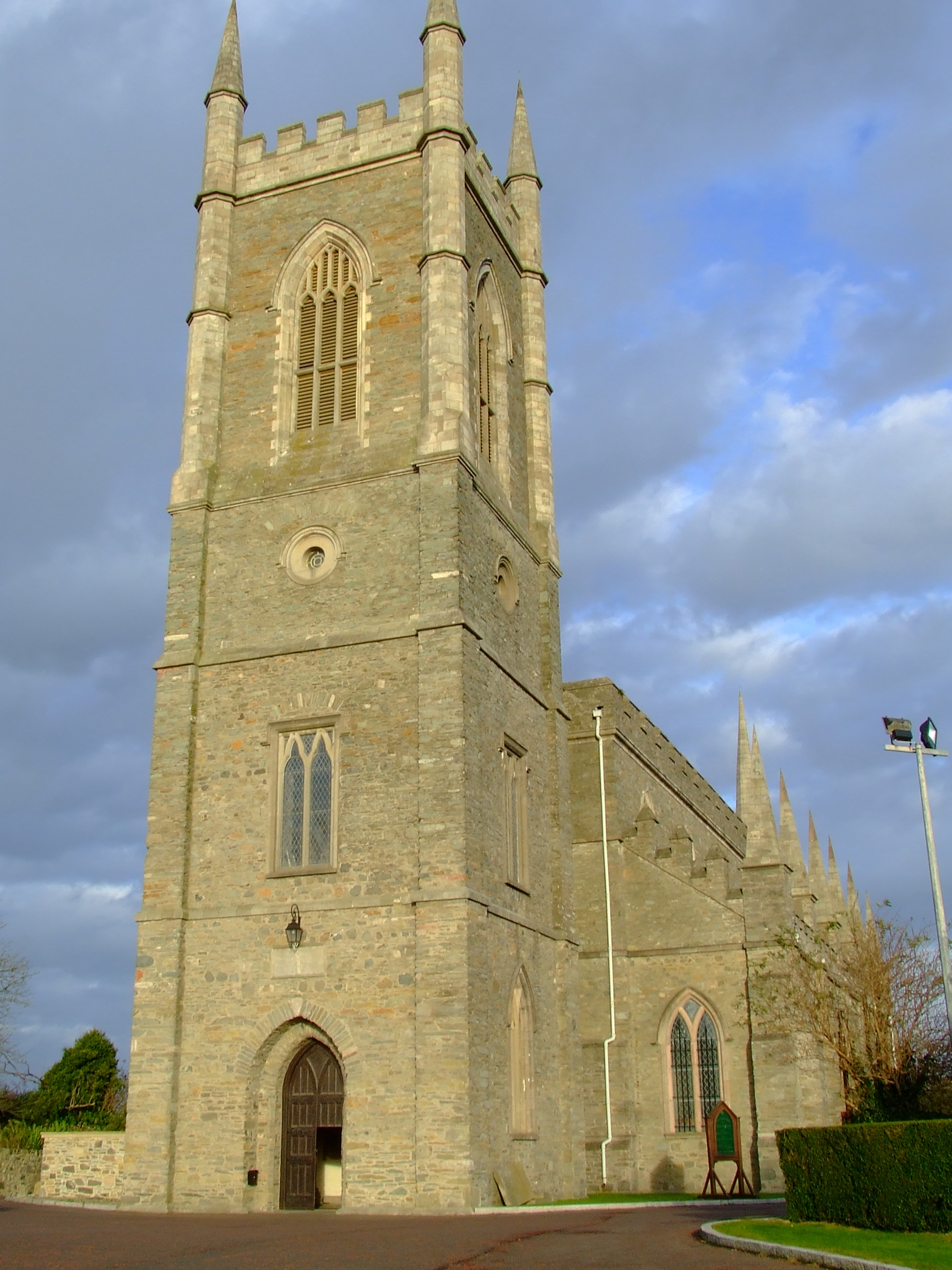
The Cathedral Church of the Holy and Undivided Trinity, Downpatrick (Down Cathedral)

The Bishop of Down was an episcopal title which took its name from the town of Downpatrick in Northern Ireland. The bishop's seat (Cathedra) was located on the site of present cathedral church of the Holy and Undivided Trinity in the Church of Ireland.

The title is now united with other bishoprics. In the Church of Ireland it is held by the Bishop of Down and Dromore, and in the Roman Catholic Church it is held by the Bishop of Down and Connor.

== History ==
The diocese of Down was one of the twenty-four dioceses establish at the Synod of Rathbreasail in 1111 and comprised roughly the eastern half of County Down. For a brief period in the early twelfth century, Down was united with the see of Connor under Máel Máedóc Ua Morgair (Saint Malachy). who also became Archbishop of Armagh.

On 29 July 1439 plans for a permanent union of the sees of Down and Connor were submitted to King Henry VI of England for his sanction. Exactly twelve months later, 29 July 1439, Pope Eugene IV issued a papal bull stating that Down and Connor were to be united on the death or resignation of either bishop. On 29 May 1441, Archbishop Prene of Armagh sent a letter to Pope Eugene IV in which he writes about the crimes and excesses of Bishop John Sely of Down, one of which was that Sely was living openly with Lettice Thomas, a married woman, at Kilclief Castle. After receiving the letter, the pope deprived Bishop Sely of the see of Down at some date before November 1442, and thereby effecting the union of the two dioceses. John Fossade, who had been bishop of Connor since 1431, became the bishop of the united see of Down and Connor in late 1442. However, there was strong local opposition to the union, and Archbishop Prene's register shows that he also was for a time opposed to the union. There were three more bishops of Down were appointed before the two sees finally united.

After the Reformation in Ireland, Down and Connor had parallel episcopal successions. In the Roman Catholic Church, Down remains united with Connor to the present today. But in the Church of Ireland, they united further with Dromore in 1842 to form the Bishopric of Down, Connor and Dromore. They continued until 1945 when they were separated into the Bishopric of Down and Dromore and the Bishopric of Connor.

== List of bishops ==
Bishops of Down
From	Until	Incumbent	Notes
unknown	1117	Máel Muire	Styled "bishop of Dundalethglass" (the original name of Downpatrick); died in office.
unknown	1123	Óengus Ua Gormáin	Died in office.
1136	1148	Saint Malachy	Máel Máedóc Ua Morgair or Malachias I; became bishop of Down and Connor in 1136, and Archbishop of Armagh in 1134; he resigned Armagh and Connor in 1136, but retained Down until his death on November 1148.
bef. 1152	1175	Máel Ísu mac in Chléirig Chuirr	Malachias II; present at the Synod of Kells in March 1152; died in office.
1175		Gilla Domangairt Mac Cormaic	Gelasius or Gilladomail McCormic; styled "Bishop of Ullagh".
1175		Amláin	Died in office.
c. 1176	1202	Echmílid	Echmílid mac Máel Martain or Malachias III; resigned before 1202; died 1204.
c. 1202	c. 1212	Radulfus OCist	Formerly Abbot of Melrose 1194–1202; appointed bishop circa 1202; died in office.
c. 1213–24	1242	Thomas	Became bishop before 1224, possibly as earlier as 1213; appears to have acted as a suffragan to the Bishop of Ely.
1251	1257	Randulphus	Became bishop before May 1251; attended a synod at Bangor in 1251; died before November 1257.
1258	1265	Reginaldus	Formerly Archdeacon of Down; elected bishop before April 1258; received possession of the temporalities and consecrated after October 1258; translated to Cloyne 13 April 1265.
1265	1277	Thomas Lydel	Thomas Liddel; elected before April 1258, but was rejected by King Henry III of England; elected again 1265 and consecrated after 5 July 1265; acted as a suffragan bishop in the diocese of Lincoln 1270; died before February 1277.
1277	1305	Nicholas le Blund OSB	Formerly Prior of Down; elected before 19 March and received possession of the temporalities after 29 March 1277; died before 28 March 1305.
1305	1314	Thomas Ketel	Elected before 18 August and received possession of the temporalities after 18 August 1305; died circa 20 March 1314.
1314	1327	Thomas Bright OSB	Formerly Prior of Down; elected after 20 March 1314; died in office.
1328		John of Baliconingham	John of Ballyconingham; elected before 4 August 1328 and received possession of the temporalities on that date, however, the election was annulled by the pope, and was translated to Cork sometime before January 1329.
1329	1353	Ralph of Kilmessan	Appointed 12 December 1328 and received possession of the temporalities 1 April 1329; died August 1353.
1353	1354	Gregory	Provost of Killala; appointed 29 January 1353 and were consecrated at Avignon; annulled 31 May 1354 and restored to his provostship at Killala.
1353	1365	Richard Calf (I)	Formerly Prior of Down; appointed 4 December; consecrated before 23 December 1353; received temporalities 6 March 1354; died 16 October 1365.
1365	1366	Robert of Aketon	Elected 18 November 1365, but did not get possession of the see; resigned before February 1366; appointed to Kildare, 2 May 1366.
1367	1368	William White OSA	Formerly Prior of Conall; appointed before December 1366; received temporalities 30 June 1367; died circa 10 August 1368.
1369	1386	Richard Calf (II) OSB	Formerly Prior of Down; appointed 19 February; received temporalities 28 April 1369; died 16 May 1386.
1386	1394	John Ross OSB	Formerly Prior of Down; appointed before 8 November 1386; received temporalities 14 March 1368; died before September 1394.
1394	1413	John Dongan	Translated from Derry 16 September 1394; received temporalities 26 July 1395; resigned before 28 July 1413.
1413	1442	John Sely	John Cely; formerly Prior of Down; appointed 28 July 1413; deprived before November 1442; died before 26 April 1445.
In 1442, the sees of Down and Connor were united by Pope Eugene IV, and John Fossade, who had been bishop of Connor since 1431, became bishop of the united see of Down and Connor. However, due to strong opposition three more bishops of Down were appointed.
1445		Ralph Alderle OSA	Appointed 26 April 1445, but did not get possession of the see.
1447	1451	Thomas Pollard OCarth	Appointed 21 June; consecrated 27 August 1447; died before June 1451.
1451	1453	Richard Wolsey OP	Appointed 21 June 1451; acted as a suffragan bishop in the dioceses of Lichfield 1452, Worcester 1465–79, and Hereford 1479; resigned the see of Down before August 1453; died after 1479.
On 24 August 1453, Thomas Knight was appointed Bishop of Down and Connor, finally uniting the two sees.

== See also ==
- Down Cathedral
- Roman Catholic Diocese of Down and Connor
- Church of Ireland Diocese of Down and Dromore
