= Frederick Mitchell (bishop) =

Irish bishop (1901–1979)

Frederick Julian Mitchell (30 July 1901 – 3 June 1979) was the 12th Bishop of Kilmore, Elphin and Ardagh who was later translated to Down and Dromore.

Educated at Campbell College and Trinity College, Dublin and ordained in 1925, his first post was a curacy at St Mary, Belfast. He then held incumbencies at St Polycarp Finaghy and the United Parishes of Kilconriola and Ballyclug, and was later appointed Rural Dean of Ballymena, his last post before ordination to the episcopate. He was elected to Down and Dromore on 18 October 1955 (his election was confirmed the same day) and he retired from that see on 7 November 1969.

Religious titles
Preceded by Albert Edward Hughes	Bishop of Kilmore, Elphin and Ardagh; 1950 –1955	Succeeded by Charles John Tyndall
Preceded by William Shaw Kerr	Bishop of Down and Dromore; 1955 –1969	Succeeded by George Alderson Quin
