= Alan Abernethy =

Irish Anglican bishop (born 1957)

The Right Reverend Alan Abernethy

Bishop of Connor
- In office 2007–2019

Personal details
- Born: 12 April 1957 (age 69)
- Spouse: Liz née Forster
- Education: Grosvenor High School, Belfast; Queen's University Belfast; Trinity College Dublin

Alan Francis Abernethy (born 12 April 1957) is an Irish Anglican bishop, and former Bishop of Connor.

Educated at Grosvenor High School, Belfast, Queen's University Belfast and Trinity College Dublin, and ordained in 1981, he began his ministry as Assistant Curate at St Elizabeth's, Dundonald.

After a similar post at Lecale he was Officiating Chaplain at RAF Bishopscourt. He was Rector at St John's, Helen's Bay, from 1987 to 1990 and then at St Columbanus, Ballyholme, until his appointment to the episcopate in 2007.

In 2010 he faced calls that he resign in connection with the controversy relating to the coming to an end of the composer Philip Stopford's tenure as Director of Music at St Anne's Cathedral, Belfast.

He retired in December 2019.

Church of Ireland titles
Preceded by Alan Harper	Bishop of Connor; 2007–2019	Succeeded by George Davison
