= Robin Eames =

Anglican Primate of All Ireland

The Right Reverend and Right Honourable The Lord Eames OM
- Archbishop of Armagh; Primate of All Ireland
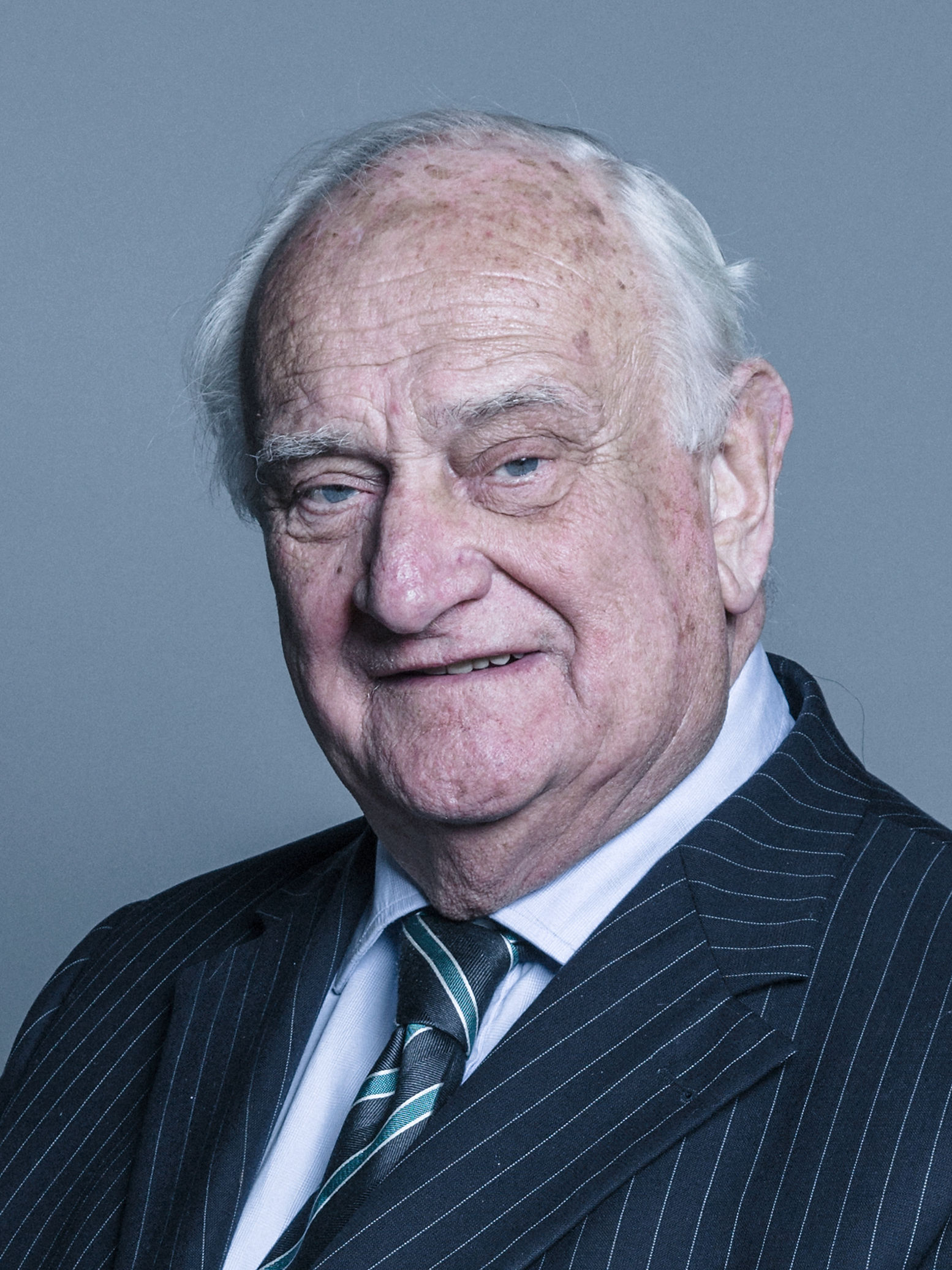
- Church: Church of Ireland
- Province: Armagh
- Diocese: Armagh
- In office: 1986–2006
- Predecessor: John Armstrong
- Successor: Alan Harper
- Previous posts: Bishop of Derry and Raphoe (1975–1980); Bishop of Down and Dromore (1980–1986)

Orders
- Ordination: 1963
- Consecration: 9 June 1975 by George Simms

Personal details
- Born: Robert Henry Alexander Eames; 27 April 1936 (age 90) Belfast, Northern Ireland
- Denomination: Anglicanism
- Spouse: Christine Daly (m. 1966)
- Education: Queen's University Belfast

Member of the House of Lords
- Lord Temporal
- Life peerage 25 August 1995

Robert Henry Alexander Eames, Baron Eames (born 27 April 1936) is an Anglican bishop and life peer, who served as Primate of All Ireland and Archbishop of Armagh from 1986 to 2006.

== Early life and education ==
Eames was born in 1936, the son of a Methodist minister. His early years were spent in Larne, with the family later moving to Belfast. He was educated at the city's Belfast Royal Academy and Methodist College Belfast (from 1947 – 1955) before going on to study at the Queen's University of Belfast, graduating LL.B. (Upper Second Class Honours) in 1960 and earning a Ph.D. degree in ecclesiastical law and history in 1963.

During his undergraduate course at Queen's, one of his philosophy lecturers was his future Roman Catholic counterpart, Cahal Daly.

== Ministry ==
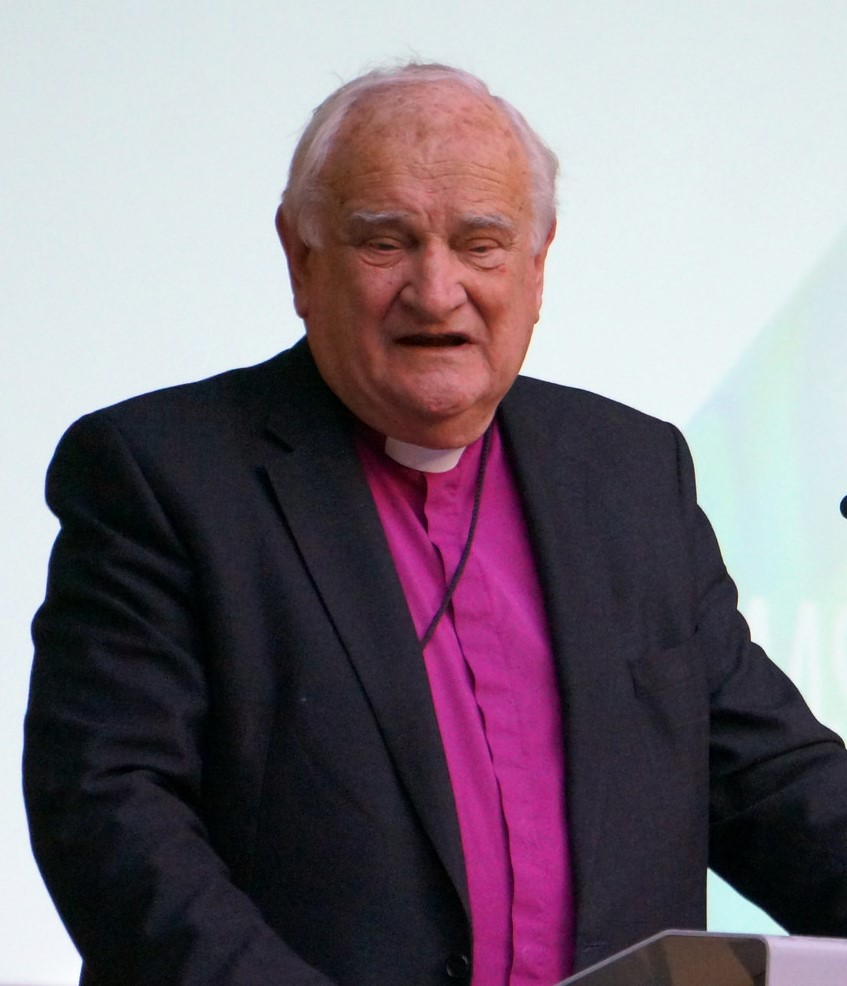
Eames in 2014

Turning his back on legal studies for ordination in the Church of Ireland, Eames embarked on a three-year course at the divinity school of Trinity College, Dublin in 1960, but found the course "intellectually unsatisfying". In 1963 he was appointed curate assistant at Bangor Parish Church, becoming rector of St Dorothea's in Belfast three years later.

In the same year, 1966, he married Christine Daly. During his time at St Dorothea's, in the Braniel and Tullycarnet area of east Belfast, he developed a "coffee bar ministry" among young people, but The Troubles interrupted. During this time he rescued a Catholic girl from a loyalist mob who had set her family home on fire. He turned down the opportunity to become dean of Cork and in 1974 was appointed rector of St Mark's in Dundela in east Belfast, a church with strong family links to C. S. Lewis.

On 9 May 1975, at the age of 38, he was elected bishop of the cross-border Diocese of Derry and Raphoe – in a groundbreaking move, he invited his similarly young Catholic counterpart, Edward Daly, to his consecration on 9 June. Eames was translated five years later, on 30 May 1980, to the Diocese of Down and Dromore. He was elected to Down and Dromore on 23 April and that election confirmed 20 May 1980. In 1986, he became the 14th Archbishop of Armagh and Primate of All Ireland since the Church of Ireland's break with Rome. It was an appointment that caused some level of astonishment among other church leaders.

== Drumcree controversy ==
Drumcree Church, a rural parish near Portadown, became the site of a major political incident in 1996, when the annual Orangemen's march was banned from returning to the centre of Portadown via the Nationalist Garvaghy road after attending worship at Drumcree parish church. This decision was made by the Chief Constable of the Royal Ulster Constabulary and not the Northern Ireland parades commission who, at this time, did not have authority to prohibit parades, existing only as an advisory body. Public unrest and violence escalated and over the next three summers the situation was unstable, with other parades coming under first police and later commission sanction.

Archbishop Eames, as diocesan bishop and civil leader found himself immersed in the search for a resolution to the issue. Within the wider Church of Ireland there was unease as it is a broad church in theology and politics and has within its congregations nationalists in the south and unionists in the north. Eames, along with the rector of Drumcree, had to navigate this wider political and social controversy and sought political assistance for his efforts to defuse tension. Some bishops in the Republic of Ireland called for Eames to close the parish church. Notable among these was Bishop John Neill who later became Archbishop of Dublin.

Eames refused to do so, believing this action could have precipitated greater unrest and possibly bloodshed. Eames described the Drumcree controversy as his "own personal Calvary".

== Anglicanism's "troubleshooter" ==
- Chairman of the Archbishop of Canterbury's Commission on "Communion and Women in the Episcopate", 1988–89.
- Chairman of the Inter-Anglican Theological and Doctrinal Commission, 1991.
- Chairman of the Lambeth Commission on Communion, 2003–2004.

Eames was, for many years, a significant figure within the general Anglican Communion. In 2003, the self-styled "divine optimist" was appointed Chairman of the Lambeth Commission on Communion, which examined significant challenges to unity in the Anglican Communion.

The Commission published its report ("the Windsor Report") on 18 October 2004.

== Retirement and succession ==
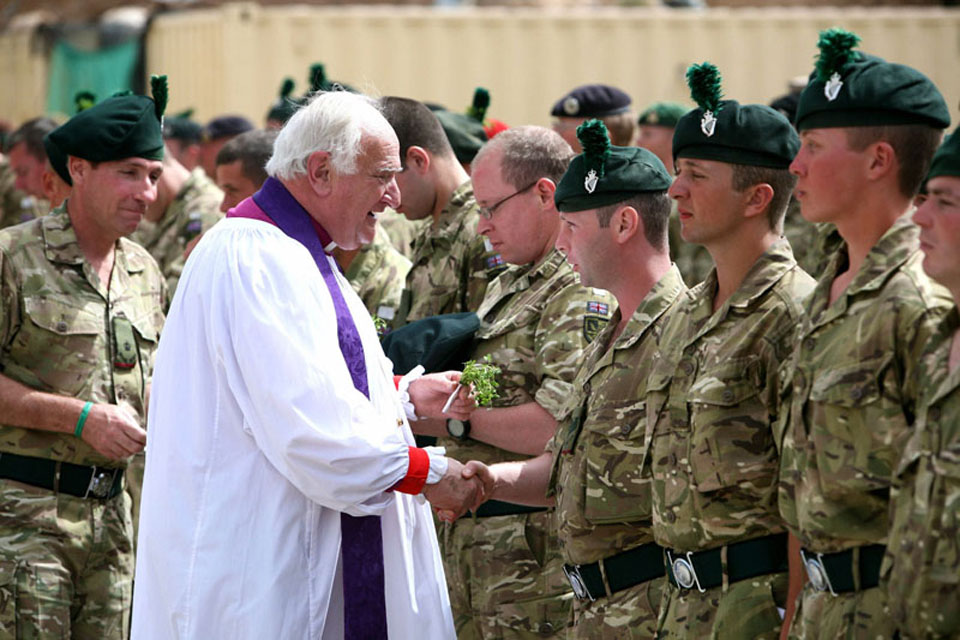
Archbishop Eames presenting shamrocks to members of The Royal Irish Regiment in 2011

At the Church of Ireland General Synod in 2006 he announced his intention to retire on 31 December 2006. Church law permitted him to continue as primate until the age of 75 but he resigned, in good health, at the age of 69. A tribute to him in The Irish Times, assessing his years of public ministry and likely legacy noted that "behind the warm smile, many know there is a man of steel."

On 10 January 2007, the eleven serving bishops of the Church of Ireland, meeting at St Patrick's Cathedral in Dublin, elected Alan Harper, Bishop of Connor, as Eames's successor.

== Consultative Group on the Past in Northern Ireland ==
In mid 2007 he was appointed co-chairman, along with Denis Bradley, of the Consultative Group on the Past in Northern Ireland. This aimed to work out how to deal with the legacy of the Troubles in Northern Ireland, especially as it affects the victims of the Troubles and their relatives.

Sources close to the Group created some controversy in early 2008 by suggesting that the Troubles could be officially classified as a "war". Relatives of security force victims argued that this would demean the sacrifice of their relatives during the darkest days of the Troubles. Their relatives were often shot when off duty and unable to defend themselves; their opponents were not obeying the rules of war as commonly understood. Many of the final recommendations were derailed over the proposed payment of a pension or stipend to victims.

The Group issued its report in January 2009.

== Honours and awards ==
- Select preacher at Oxford University, 1987.
- Created a life peer, he was gazetted as Baron Eames, of Armagh in the County of Armagh, on 25 August 1995 (on the recommendation of the Prime Minister, John Major, MP). He sits as a crossbencher.
- Honorary doctorates: Doctor of Laws degree (LL.D.), honoris causa by The Queen's University of Belfast, 1989; Doctor of Laws degree (LL.D.) honoris causa by Trinity College, Dublin, 1992; Doctor of Letters degree (D.Litt.) honoris causa by Greenwich University of Cambridge, 1994; Doctor of Divinity degree (D.D.) honoris causa by University of Cambridge, 1994; Doctor of Laws degree (LL.D.) honoris causa by Lancaster University, 1994; Doctor of Divinity degree (D.D.) honoris causa by Aberdeen University, 1997; Doctor of Divinity degree (D.D.) honoris causa by Exeter University, 1999; Doctor of Laws degree (LL.D.) honoris causa by University of Ulster, 2002. Doctor of Divinity degree (D.D.) honoris causa by the University of London, 2008.
- Honorary Bencher of Lincoln's Inn, London 1998.
- Archbishop of Canterbury's Award for Outstanding Service to the Anglican Communion. The Award was presented by the Archbishop of Canterbury, Rowan Williams, on 16 November 2006, at a special service in St Patrick's Cathedral, Armagh. Presenting the award, Archbishop Williams said: “We have in the Anglican Communion various ways of recognising distinguished service. There are awards given at Lambeth, there is the Cross of St Augustine. But once in a while somebody comes along for whom this doesn't seem completely adequate and when Desmond Tutu retired, the then Archbishop of Canterbury invented the Archbishop of Canterbury's Award for Outstanding Service to the Anglican Communion. Tonight it is a huge privilege to present that award for the second time.”
- Tipperary International Peace Award, 2006 (to be presented in April 2007 at the Tipperary International Festival).
- In 2007, he received the Order of Merit from Elizabeth II; this is an exclusive order, restricted to 24 members, who receive it in the personal gift of the monarch, and which entitles recipients to the postnominals 'OM' after their name. He represented the Order at the 2023 Coronation.
- Given the Freedom of the City of Armagh in 2007.

Coat of arms of Robin Eames
Crest Within a circlet of shamrocks Or a mitre with infulae Proper. Escutcheon Azure on a fess embattled counterembattled Or between three Celtic crosses each dimidated with a shamrock Or a barrulet Azure. Supporters Dexter, a stag per fess Sable and Vert attired and unguled Or gorged with a riband tied Purpure semy of shamrocks Pr; sinister, a stag per fess Vert and Sable attired unguled and gorged with a like riband.

== See also ==
- List of Life Peerages
- List of Northern Ireland Members of the House of Lords

== Sources ==
- Alf McCreary, Nobody's Fool (biography of Robin Eames)

Church of Ireland titles
Preceded by Cuthbert Peacocke	Bishop of Derry and Raphoe; 1975–1980	Succeeded by James Mehaffey
Preceded by George Quin	Bishop of Down and Dromore; 1980–1986	Succeeded by Gordon McMullan
Preceded by John Armstrong	Archbishop of Armagh; 1986–2006	Succeeded by Alan Harper
