= David McClay =

Irish Anglican bishop (born 1959)

The Rt. Rev. David Alexander McClay (born 1959) is an Irish Anglican bishop.

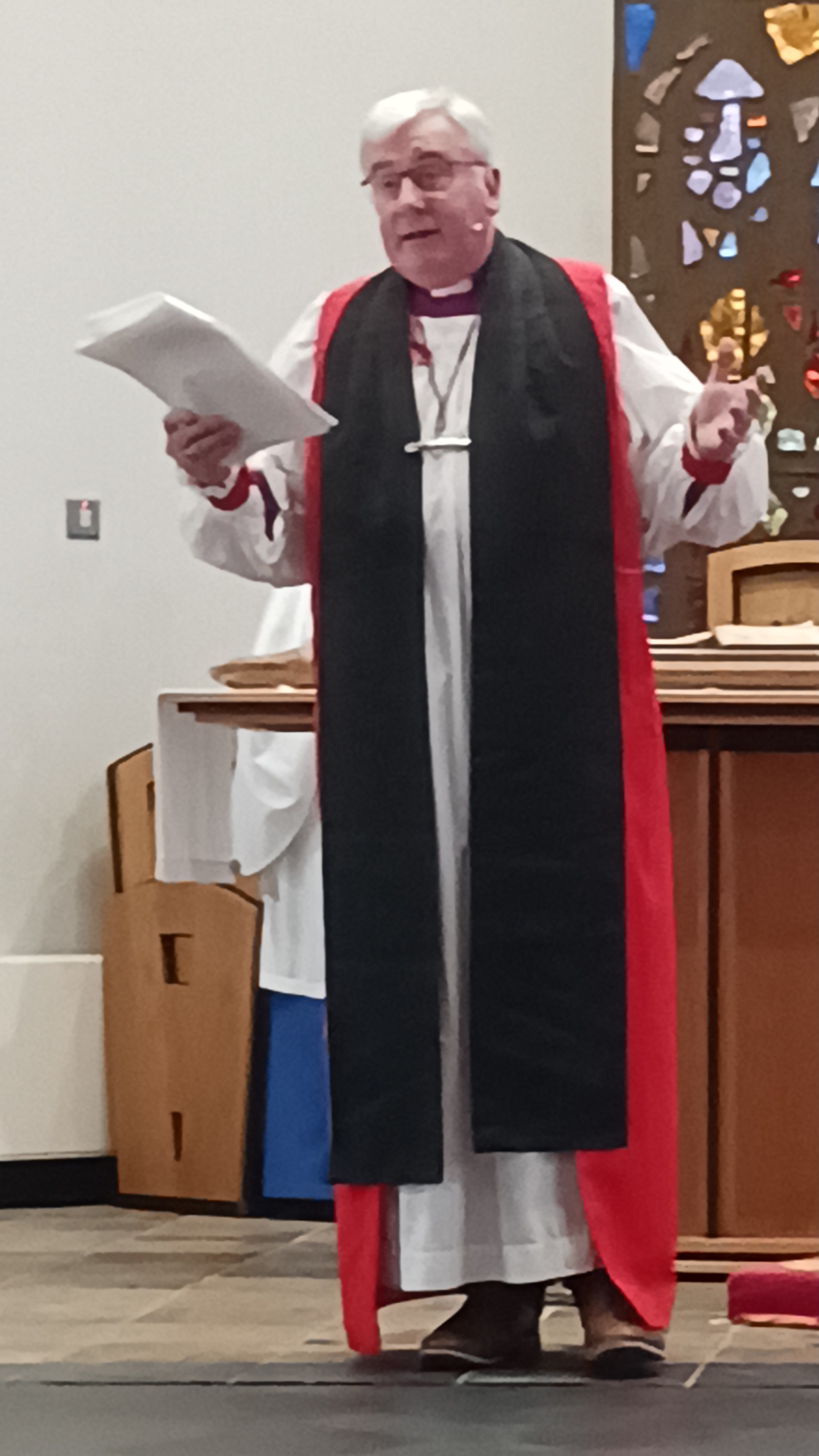
The Right Rev. David McClay, Bishop of Down and Dromore, in the Church of the Transfiguration, Belvoir, Belfast, in September 2024

== Biography ==
McClay is the current Bishop of Down and Dromore in the Church of Ireland.

Bishop McClay was born on 5 June 1959 in Ballyshannon in the south of County Donegal in the west of Ulster; he was raised in the nearby village of Ballintra, also in South Donegal. He received his primary education at the Robertson School in Ballintra and his secondary education at the Royal and Prior School in Raphoe in East Donegal, where he was a boarder. He was later educated at Trinity College, Dublin (TCD). He was ordained an Anglican priest in 1988. His first post was a curacy at Magheralin in the north-west of County Down. After this he held incumbencies at Kilkeel and Willowfield. His appointment as Archdeacon of Down was announced in December 2016.

He was elected Bishop of Down and Dromore on 4 November 2019. He is a member of GAFCON.
