= William Kerr (bishop) =

Irish Anglican bishop

William Shaw Kerr (1873 - 2 February 1960) was an Irish Anglican bishop, the first Bishop of Down and Dromore in the Church of Ireland.

Kerr was born in 1873 and educated at Trinity College, Dublin and ordained in 1897, his first post was a curacy at Lurgan. He was then Rector of Banbridge, Archdeacon of Dromore and finally (before his ordination to the episcopate) Dean of Belfast. He was elected Bishop of Down and Dromore on 9 December 1944 and consecrated on 25 January 1945. He resigned on 31 July 1955 and died on 2 February 1960.

== Works ==
- A Handbook on the Papacy. London: Marshall, Morgan & Scott. 1950. OCLC 51018118.

== Notes ==
Church of Ireland titles
Preceded by Henry Robert Brett	Dean of Belfast; 1927 –1945	Succeeded by Robert Cyril Hamilton Glover Elliott
Preceded by Inaugural appointment	Bishop of Down and Dromore; 1945 –1955	Succeeded by Frederick Julian Mitchell
