= Richard Mant =

English churchman and writer (1776–1848)

- Born: 12 February 1776; Southampton, England
- Died: 2 November 1848 (aged 72); Ballymoney, Ireland
- Occupations: Bishop, hymnodist

Richard Mant (12 February 1776 – 2 November 1848) was an English churchman who became a bishop in Ireland. He was a prolific writer, his major work being a History of the Church of Ireland.

== Life ==
He was born at Southampton, where his father Richard Mant D.D. was headmaster of the King Edward VI School. He was educated at Winchester College and at Trinity College, Oxford (which he entered in 1793). His youngest sister was the writer Alicia Catherine Mant. His maternal grandfather was the scholar Joseph Bingham. He was elected a Scholar of the College in 1794, graduated with a BA in 1797, and became a fellow of Oriel College in 1798 (a position he held up to 1804).

Mant was ordained in the Church of England, initially holding a curacy at Southampton in 1802. He was then appointed to the vicarage of Coggeshall, Essex in 1810, and in 1811 he became Bampton Lecturer. In 1816 he was made rector of St Botolph's, Bishopsgate, and in 1820 became Bishop of Killaloe and Kilfenora, in Ireland. In 1823 he was translated to Down and Connor, and from 1842 was the Bishop of Down, Connor and Dromore when the two dioceses united.

Richard Mant died in Ballymoney, Ireland on 2 November 1848.

== Works ==
In 1808 Mant published The Simpliciad, a satirical poem that parodied Poems, in Two Volumes (1807) by William Wordsworth. He gave notes relating his parodies to the originals. The aim of the work included the other Lake Poets, Robert Southey and Samuel Taylor Coleridge, with To a Young Ass by Coleridge used to tease the group as a whole. In 1832, Mant published The Gospel of Miracles, in a Series of Poetical Sketches, with Illustrative Conversations, an attempt to represent the miracles of the Saviour in verse.

Mant's Ancient Hymns from the Roman Breviary (1837) was one of the earliest collections of translated Latin hymnody in English. He belonged to a group of revivalist translators of Latin hymns, with John Chandler (1806–1876) and Isaac Williams. John Ellerton commented on his good taste, but also discerned a lack of understanding of the group of hymns he was handling. The Psalms in an English Metrical Version (1824) were influenced by Robert Lowth's theories of biblical poetry, the psalms becoming "stiff and stately odes" according to John Julian.

Other works included:

- A biblical commentary written with George D'Oyly
- History of the Church of Ireland (1839–1841; 2 vols.).
- An Appeal to the Gospel (1812), Bampton Lectures.
- The Book of Common Prayer...with Notes (1850).
- An Explanation of the Rubrics of the Book of Common Prayer (1864).

== Family ==
Mant married Elizabeth Wood (died 2 April 1846), of a Sussex family, on 22 December 1804. Their children were Walter Bishop Mant, another son, and a daughter.

== Notes ==
Church of Ireland titles
Preceded by Lord Robert Ponsonby Tottenham Loftus	Bishop of Killaloe and Kilfenora; 1820–1823	Succeeded by Alexander Arbuthnot
Preceded by Nathaniel Alexander	Bishop of Down and Connor; 1823–1842	Succeeded by Became Bishop of Down, Connor and Dromore
Preceded by First Bishop of Down, Connor and Dromore	Bishop of Down, Connor and Dromore; 1842–1848	Succeeded by Robert Bent Knox
