= Archdeacon of Down =

Province of Armagh
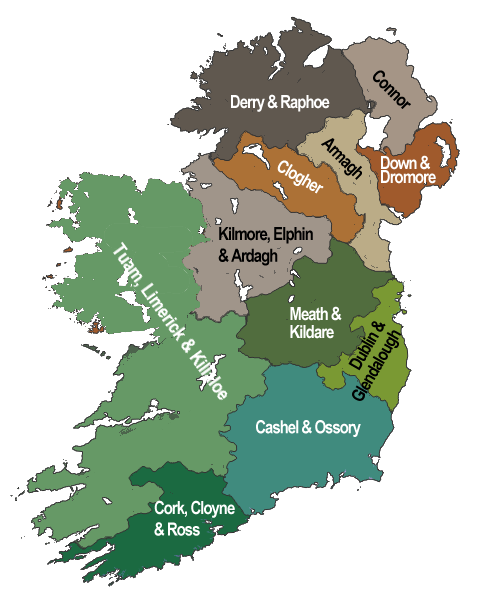
- Church: Church of Ireland
- Metropolitan bishop: Archbishop of Armagh
- Cathedral: St Patrick's Cathedral, Armagh (Church of Ireland)
- Dioceses: 7

The Archdeacon of Down is a senior ecclesiastical officer within the Diocese of Down and Dromore (in the Church of Ireland), formerly (in the Church of Ireland) the Diocese of Down, Connor and Dromore, formerly (but currently in the Catholic Church) the Diocese of Down and Connor, formerly the Diocese of Down. The archdeacon is responsible for the disciplinary supervision of the clergy within the diocese. The archdeaconry can trace its history back to Bernard who held the office in 1268. David McClay, who was elected Bishop of Down and Dromore on 4 November 2019. appointed Jim Cheshire October 2023 for the Down congregations.

== Incumbents ==
From 1244 to 1879 the rector of Seagoe was Archdeacon of Down.

- John Logan, attested 1367-9, also given as Bishop of Down in 1638
- Eugene Magennis, Bishop of Down and Connor from 1539 to 1563
- 1628–1640 Robert Maxwell, Bishop of Kilmore from 1643 to 1661; then Bishop of Kilmore and Ardagh until 1672
- 1640–1654 John Richardson (bishop of Ardagh), Bishop of Ardagh from 1633 until 1641
- 1950–1956 Cuthbert Irvine Peacocke, Bishop of Derry and Raphoe from 1970 to 1975
- 1956– George Alderson Quin, Bishop of Down and Dromore from 1970 to 1980
- 1970– Gordon McMullan, Bishop of Down and Dromore from 1986 to 1997
- 2016–2020 David McClay, consecrated as Bishop of Down and Dromore from 2020.
- 2020– Ken Higgins
- 2023– Jim Cheshire

== See also ==
- Archdeacon of Connor
- Archdeacon of Dromore
