= Archdeacon of Dromore =

Province of Armagh
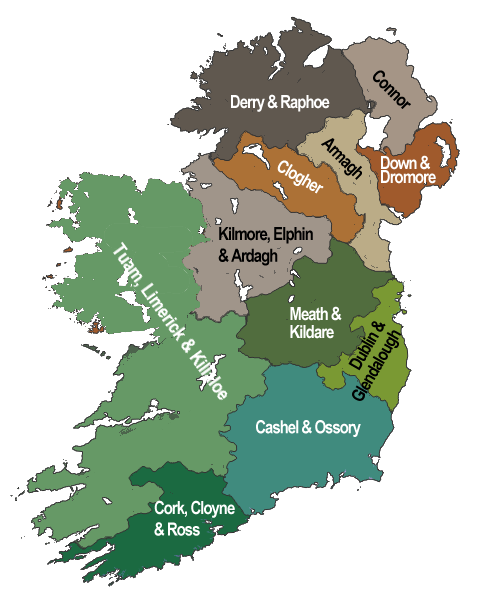
- Church: Church of Ireland
- Metropolitan bishop: Archbishop of Armagh
- Cathedral: St Patrick's Cathedral, Armagh (Church of Ireland)
- Dioceses: 7

The Archdeacon of Dromore is a senior ecclesiastical officer within the Anglican Diocese of Down and Dromore. The archdeacon is responsible for the disciplinary supervision of clergy within the diocese.

== History ==
The archdeaconry can trace its history back to Andreas, who held the office before becoming bishop of Dromore in 1244. The current incumbent is Mark Harvey. In between, many of them went on to higher office:

- 1663–1664: Thomas Bayly
- 1664–1665: Patrick Sheridan (Bishop of Cloyne, 1679–1682)
- 1667–1682: Patrick Sheridan
- 1832–1879: James Saurin
- 1886–: Theophilus Campbell
- 1895–1905: Jonathan Harding
- 1905–1929: Edward Atkinson
- 1930–1932: William Kerr (Bishop of Down and Dromore, 1944–1955)
- –1970: Samuel Crooks (Dean of Belfast, 1970–1985)
- 1970–1985: Jack Shearer (Dean of Belfast, 1985–2001)
- 1985–1987: William Neill
- Ken Good (Bishop of Derry and Raphoe, 2002–2019)
- 1997–2005: David Chillingworth (Bishop of St Andrews, Dunkeld and Dunblane, 2004–2017)
- 2005–2011: John Scott
- 2011–2023: Roderic West
- 2023–: Mark Harvey

== See also ==
- Archdeacon of Down
- Archdeacon of Connor
- Clanwilliam Earldom
- Freeman Wills Crofts
- John Meade, 1st Earl of Clanwilliam
