= Diocese of Down and Dromore =

Anglican diocese of the Church of Ireland

United Dioceses of Down and Dromore
- Coat of arms

Location
- Country: Northern Ireland
- Ecclesiastical province: Armagh
- Archdeaconries: Down, Dromore
- Headquarters: 285-287 Castlereagh Road, Belfast, BT5 5FL

Statistics
- Parishes: 77
- Churches: 111
- Members: 64,500

Information
- Denomination: Church of Ireland
- Cathedral: 1) Down Cathedral; 2) Dromore Cathedral; 3) St Anne's Cathedral

Current leadership
- Bishop: David Alexander McClay, Bishop of Down and Dromore
- Archdeacons: The Ven Jim Cheshire; Archdeacon of Down; The Ven Mark Harvey, Archdeacon of Dromore

Website
- downanddromore.org

The Diocese of Down and Dromore (also known as the United Dioceses of Down and Dromore) is a diocese of the Church of Ireland in the south east of Northern Ireland. It is in the ecclesiastical province of Armagh. The geographical remit of the diocese covers half of the City of Belfast to the east of the River Lagan and the part of County Armagh east of the River Bann and all of County Down.

== Overview and history ==
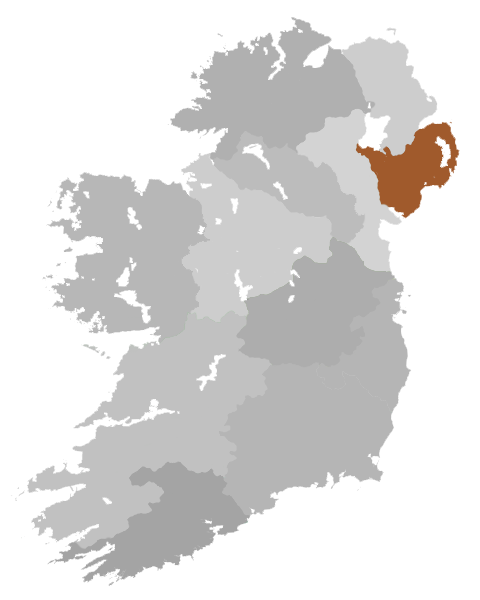
Diocese Highlighted

When the Church in England broke communion with the Catholic Church, the Church of England was established by the state as the established church. Later, by decree of the Irish Parliament, a similar new body became the state church in the Kingdom of Ireland. The English-speaking minority mostly adhered to the Church of Ireland or to Presbyterianism. On the death of Archbishop Trench of Tuam in 1839, the Province of Tuam was united to Armagh. Over the centuries, numerous dioceses were merged, in view of declining membership. Until 1944, the dioceses of Down and Dromore were part of the United Dioceses of Down, Connor and Dromore. In 1944, the Diocese of Connor gained a separate existence under its own bishop. It is for this reason that the united diocese has three cathedrals.

== Coat of arms ==
In 2011 the arms of the united diocese were confirmed by the office of the Chief Herald of Ireland. This design quartered arms that had long been recorded in the records of both the College of Arms in London and the Genealogical Office in Dublin as those of the dioceses of Down and Dromore. The arms are blazoned as follows:

Quarterly, 1st and 4th for Down: Azure two keys in saltire, the wards upward Or suppressed by a lamb passant Argent; 2nd and 3rd for Dromore: Argent two keys in saltire the wards upward Gules suppressed by an open book Proper between in chief and in base two crosses patée fitchée Azure.

== Cathedrals ==
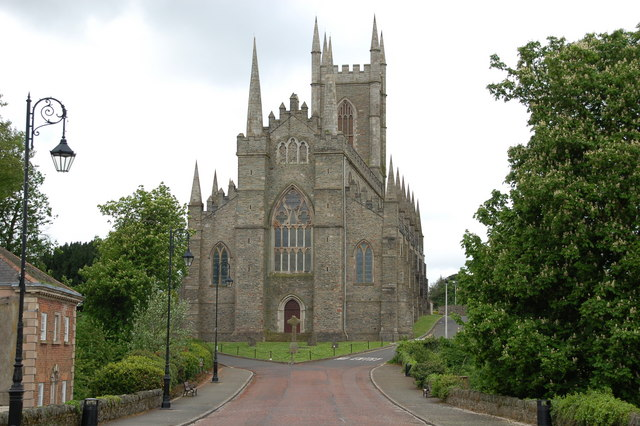
Holy Trinity Cathedral

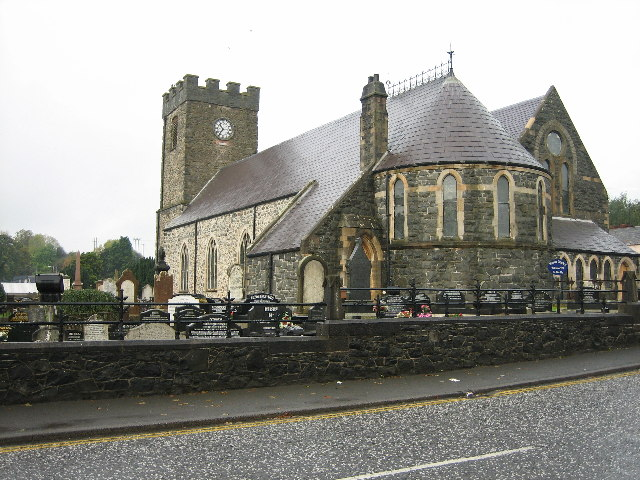
Dromore Cathedral

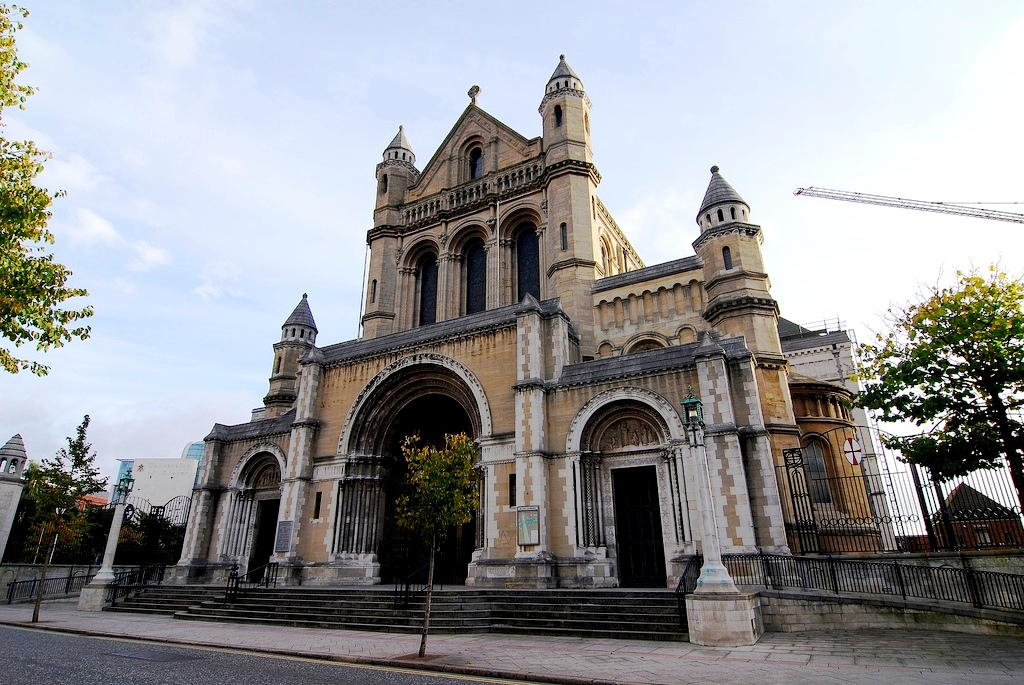
St Anne's Cathedral

- Holy Trinity Cathedral, Downpatrick
- Cathedral of Christ the Redeemer, Dromore.
- St Anne's Cathedral, Belfast (Shared with the Diocese of Connor)

The Diocese is the second largest of the Church of Ireland in terms of church population, with around 91,000 people and more than one hundred serving ordained Clergy. It is divided up into 79 parishes, with a total of 115 churches.

== Bishops ==
Although the united diocese works under a single bishop, currently David McClay, each of the two dioceses within it has its own set of officers.

Bishops of Down and Connor

- John Charden (1596–1601)
- Henry Leslie (1635–1661)
- Jeremy Taylor (1661–1667)
- Roger Boyle (1667–1672)
- John Ryder (1743–1752)
- Richard Mant (1823–1842)

Bishops of Down, Connor and Dromore

- Richard Mant (1842–1848)
- Robert Bent Knox (1849–1886)
- William Reeves (1886–1892)
- John Baptist Crozier (1907–1911)
- Charles Frederick D'Arcy (1911–1919)
- Charles T. P. Grierson (1919–1934)
- Charles King Irwin (1942–1944)

Bishops of Down and Dromore

- William Shaw Kerr (1945–1955)
- Frederick Julian Mitchell (1955–1969)
- George Alderson Quin (1970–1980)
- Robert "Robin" Eames (1980–1986)
- Harold Creeth Miller (1997–2019)
- David Alexander McClay (2020–present)

== Relation with the Anglican realignment ==
Former Bishop Harold Miller is a member of GAFCON, and he attended GAFCON III, held in Jerusalem, on 17–22 June 2018. His successor, David McClay, is also a member of GAFCON.

== See also ==
- List of Anglican dioceses in the United Kingdom and Ireland
- Roman Catholic Diocese of Down and Connor
- Roman Catholic Diocese of Dromore
