= Archdeacon of Connor =

The Archdeacon of Connor is a senior ecclesiastical officer within the Diocese of Connor.

The archdeaconry can trace its history from Eustacius, the first known incumbent, who went on to be Bishop of the Diocese to the current (as of 2017) incumbent Stephen McBride. McBride is responsible for the disciplinary supervision of the Connor clergy; and the upkeep of diocesan property.

== See also ==
- Archdeacon of Down
- Archdeacon of Dromore
