= Diocese of Connor (Church of Ireland) =

Diocese in the province of Armagh of the Church of Ireland

Diocese of Connor Dioecesis Connorensis Deoise Chonaire
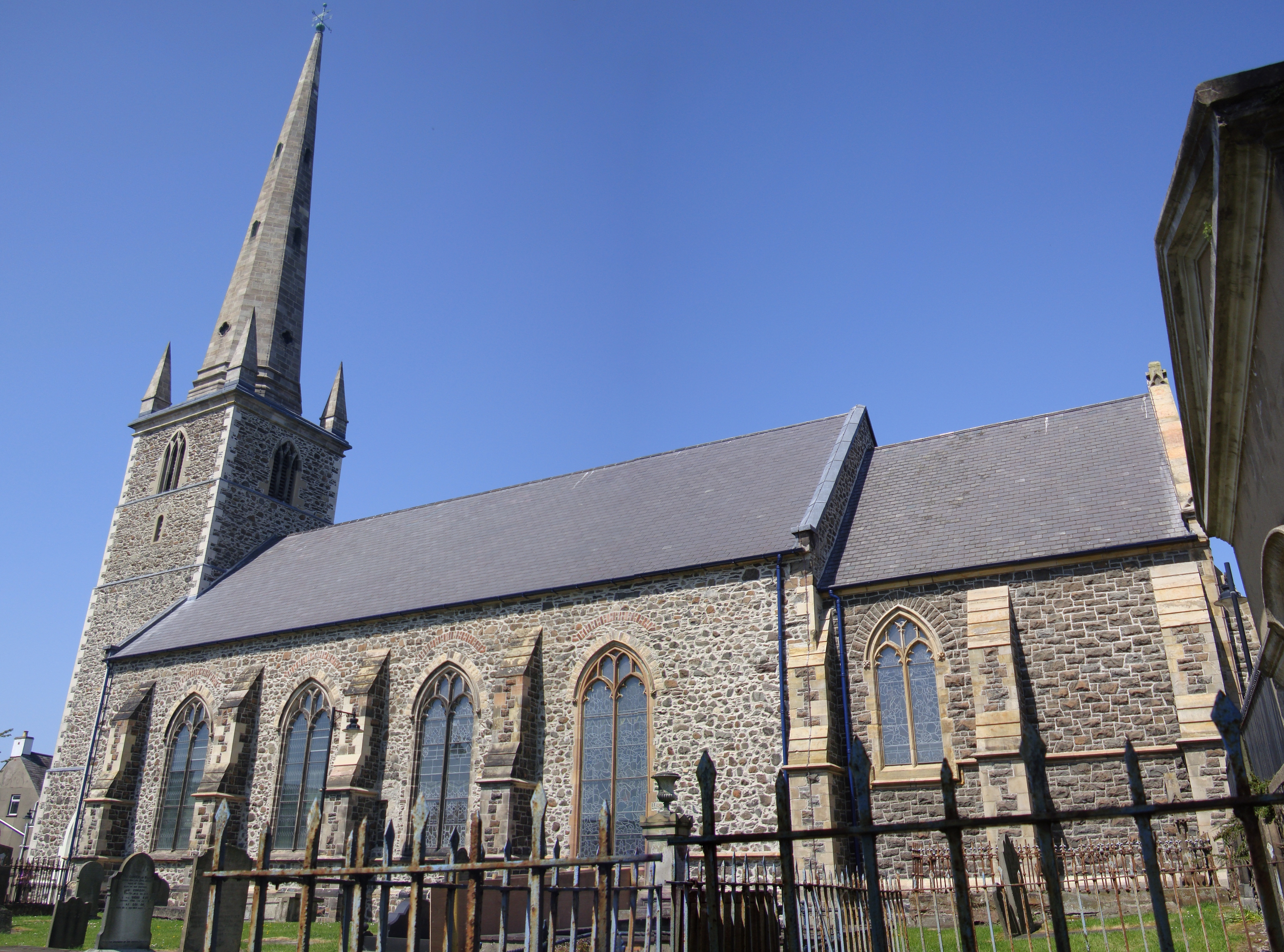

- Coat of arms

Location
- Country: Northern Ireland, United Kingdom
- Ecclesiastical province: Armagh
- Archdeaconries: Connor, Dalriada, Belfast

Information
- Denomination: Church of Ireland
- Cathedral: 1) Christ Church Cathedral, Lisburn; 2) St Anne's Cathedral, Belfast

Current leadership
- Bishop: The Rt Revd George Davison

Website
- connordiocese.org.uk

The Diocese of Connor is in the province of Armagh of the Church of Ireland located in Northern Ireland.

== Overview and history ==
Christianity has been present in Connor Diocese for over 1500 years. Tradition holds that St. Patrick herded sheep on Slemish, in the heart of the Diocese, when first brought to Ireland as a slave. Saint Malachy, the great reformer of the Irish church, was consecrated Bishop of Connor in 1124 and remained until his translation to the Archbishopric of Armagh in 1132. The see was originally at Connor. There is much evidence, from written sources and archaeological material, that Connor was a sizeable, complex settlement in the Early Christian period, probably with monastic and secular elements coexisting. There was no monastic establishment at Connor in the Middle Ages, though there was an Augustinian community at Kells nearby.

When the Church in England broke communion with the Catholic Church, the Church of England was established by the state as the established church. Later, by decree of the Irish Parliament, a similar new body became the State Church in the Kingdom of Ireland. It assumed possession of most Church property (and so retained a great repository of religious architecture and other items, though some were later destroyed). The substantial majority of the population remained faithful to the Latin Church of the Catholic Church, despite the political and economic advantages of membership in the state church. They were obliged to find alternative premises and to conduct their services in secret. The English-speaking minority mostly adhered to the Church of Ireland or to Presbyterianism. On the death of Archbishop Trench of Tuam in 1839, the Province of Tuam was united to Armagh. Over the centuries, numerous dioceses were merged, in view of declining membership.

The area remained a stronghold of Gaelic and Catholic culture until the Plantation of Ulster. The majority of planters came from Scotland and were not only Presbyterian but also covenanters and fiercely opposed to episcopacy. Such was the anti-Anglican tenor of the Scottish settlers that the English divine, Jeremy Taylor, for a time Bishop of the United Dioceses of Down, Connor and Dromore, said of his new home, "I perceive myself thrown into a place of torment." County Antrim, corresponding closely with the Diocese of Connor soon became the most Protestant county in Ireland, a situation which remains the case today.

=== Previous entities ===
The modern Anglican form of the diocese came into being when the Diocese of Connor was split from the hitherto United Dioceses of Down, Connor and Dromore in 1944. The Diocesan Cathedral is in Christ Church Lisburn, although this functions largely as a parish church for Lisburn City Centre. Because of its larger size, St Anne's Cathedral, Belfast, is shared with the Diocese of Down and Dromore for major church events. With the translation of Alan Harper to Armagh, the House of Bishops met in Dublin on 17 April 2007 to elect Archbishop Harper's successor.

=== Recent history ===
In the 19th century, Belfast became the epicentre of the Industrial Revolution in Ireland. Other towns in the diocese, such as Ballymena, Larne and Lisburn, were also among Ireland's foremost industrial centres. The Church of Ireland population of the Diocese increased dramatically as people moved to the area to work in the factories in the major towns, both from rural areas of Ulster with large Anglican populations like County Armagh and County Fermanagh and from England.

The rapid growth in the population of the Greater Belfast area as well as the rapid drop in the Protestant population of the Republic after Partition of Ireland in 1922 led to the bizarre situation where the United Dioceses of Down, Connor and Dromore, just one of fourteen Church of Ireland Dioceses had over half the Anglican population of the whole island. In 1944, therefore Connor Diocese was split off from the other two. St. Anne's Cathedral, Belfast built in 1905 to serve as a single cathedral for the Diocese, theoretically running alongside, but in practice replacing the existing cathedrals in Lisburn, Downpatrick and Dromore, saw two bishops of two distinct dioceses have stalls in the cathedral within forty years.

In the 1950s and 1960s rapid slum clearance and suburbanisation saw a number of new parishes created, however demographic changes, movement of people to suburban areas in the Diocese of Down and Dromore and the growth of both secularism and small Evangelical churches saw a decline in membership. Between the end of the Second World War and 2001, the number of Anglicans in the Diocese decreased by 30%, the largest drop in Ireland, although it remains the largest Diocese in the Church.

The Troubles presented the Diocese with major challenges – in common with every other community in Northern Ireland, many Anglicans in the Diocese were killed or injured in terrorist related incidents. Ecumenism, which since the 1960s has become a steadily more important part of Anglican life in the Diocese, had to be carried out against the background of civil strife in which religion played a major factor. Demographic change, exacerbated by sectarian tensions, meant that North and West Belfast, within the Diocese, became more and more Catholic, while many Church of Ireland members who had previously lived there moved to suburban areas in County Down, causing many Belfast parishes to close or severely cut back their activities.

=== Coat of arms ===
Shortly after the establishment of Connor as a separate diocese, a grant of arms was obtained from the College of Arms in London in May 1945, blazoned as follows:

Azure, a lamb passant supporting with the dexter foreleg a staff proper, flying therefrom a pennon argent charged with a saltire gules, between three cross crosslets Or; on a chief of the last two crosiers in saltire of the field.

The arms were confirmed by the Chief Herald of Ireland in January 2011, although blazoned as follows:

Azure between three crosses crosslet or a lamb passant supporting with the dexter foreleg a staff proper flying therefrom a pennant argent charged with a saltire gules on a chief of the second two crosiers of the field.

== Geographic remit ==
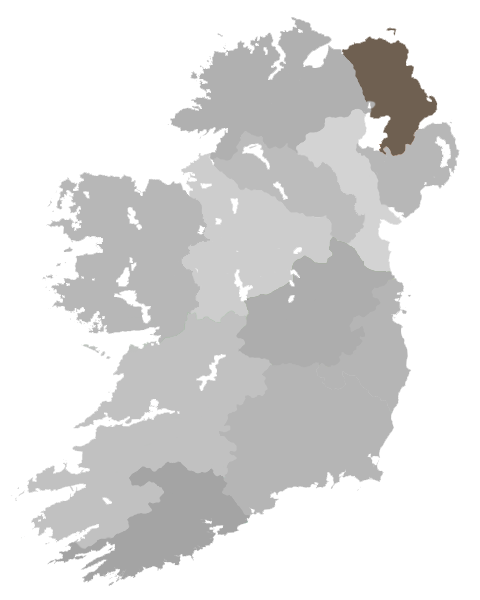
Diocese Highlighted

It is based on the traditional County Antrim, including those parts of Belfast west of the River Lagan, and a small part of County Londonderry including Portstewart and those parts of Coleraine east of the River Bann.

Based on Census figures, more than 100,000 self-described adherents of the Church of Ireland live in the Diocese, making it home to the largest Anglican population of any Irish diocese and more than one in four members of the Church of Ireland. It is unusual in being the only Church of Ireland diocese where Presbyterianism, rather than Roman Catholicism is the religious denomination of a plurality of the population.

== Style and ethos ==
In common with much of the Church of Ireland, most parishes in the Diocese are very moderately Low Church in ethos or part of the central liturgical tradition. However, there are a growing number of distinctly Evangelical Anglican parishes in the Diocese, while a small number of parishes in Belfast could be described as High Church, in the case of St. George's in Belfast City Centre even Anglo-Catholic.

In consonance with this moderate tradition, the Diocese has retained a cautious line in the Anglican debate on homosexuality. Bishop Harper, although perceived as one of the more liberal bishops in the Church of Ireland, stated that "it is not appropriate to proceed to any form of Blessing of a Registered Civil Partnership." However, the diocesan synod, unlike those in other Northern Dioceses with more strongly Evangelical traditions, failed to endorse a motion on Lambeth Conference Resolution I.10.

Bishop George Davison, elected in February 2020, is seen as theologically conservative, having served previously in the Diocese of Kilmore, Elphin and Ardagh.

== Ordinaries ==
The current Bishop of Connor is George Davison, who was elected on 17 February 2020 and consecrated a bishop on 3 September 2020. The previous bishop, Alan Francis Abernethy, retired on 31 December 2019. He was consecrated on Friday 29 June 2007 by the Archbishop of Armagh. The consecration took place on the feast day of St Peter and St Paul, coinciding with the Bishop's ordination as priest twenty five years earlier.

- Charles King Irwin (1945–1956)
- Robert Cyril Hamilton Glover Elliott (1956–1969)
- Arthur Hamilton Butler (1969–1981)
- William John McCappin (1981–1987)
- Samuel Greenfield Poyntz (1987–1995)
- James Edward Moore (1995–2001)
- Alan Edwin Thomas Harper (2002–2007)
- Alan Abernethy (2007–2019)
- George Davison (2020–present)

== Cathedrals ==
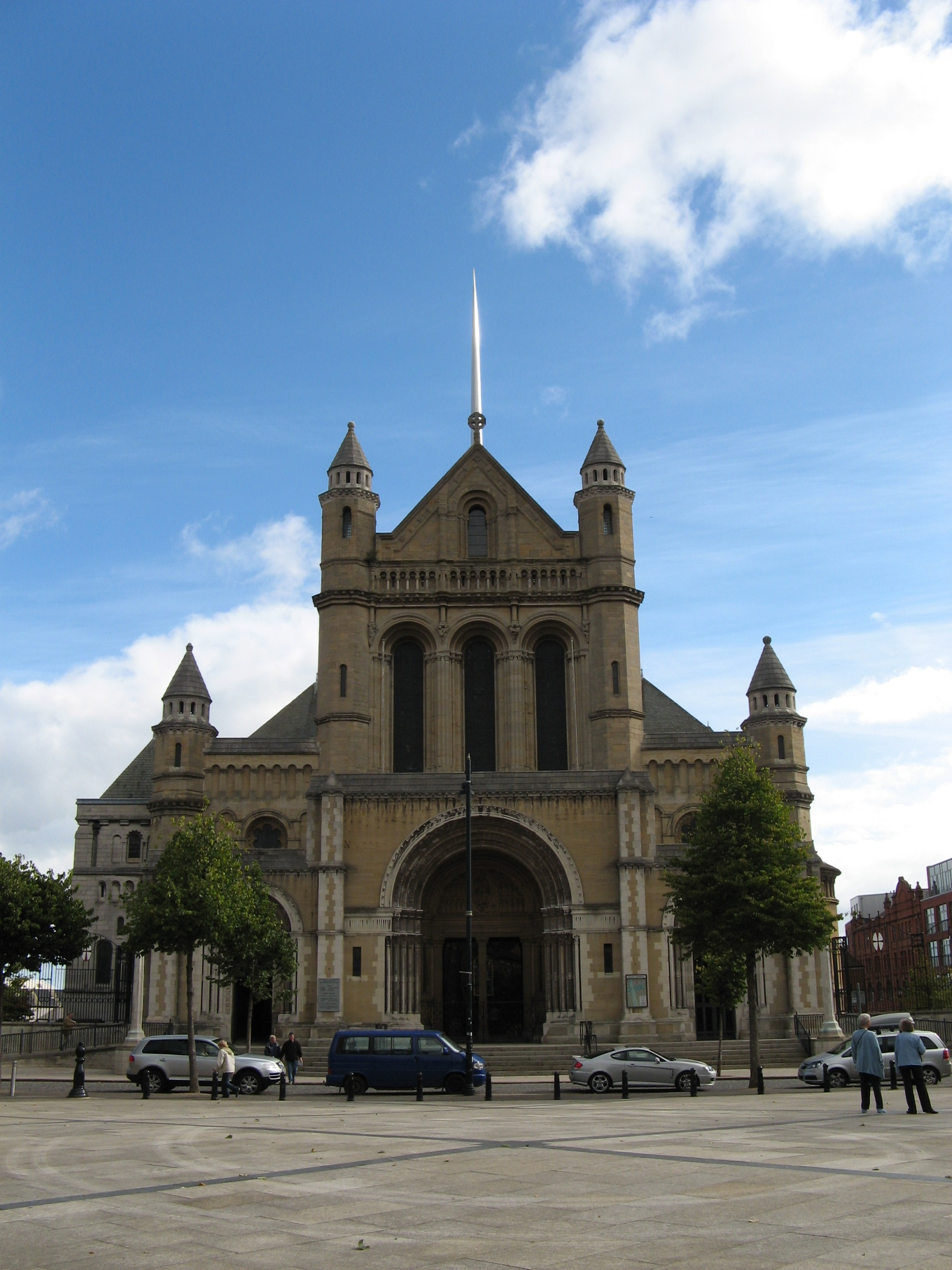
- St Anne's Cathedral, Belfast, the second Cathedral of the Diocese.
  Christ Church Cathedral, Lisburn
- St Anne's Cathedral, Belfast

== Administration ==
Since early 2007 the Diocese has comprised three archdeaconries:

1. Belfast
2. Connor
3. Dalriada

and ten rural deaneries (some of them far from rural):

1. North Belfast
2. Mid Belfast
3. South Belfast
4. Antrim
5. Ballymena
6. Carey (centred on Ballycastle)
7. Carrickfergus
8. Coleraine
9. Derryaghy
10. Lisburn

Belfast Archdeaconry has been created from Connor Archdeaconry, and a more general re-organisation of the rural deaneries is expected.

The following are the current Archdeacons:

- Belfast: The Venerable George Davison
- Connor: The Venerable Stephen McBride
- Dalriada: The Venerable Paul Dundas

== See also ==
- Dean of Connor
- List of Anglican dioceses in the United Kingdom and Ireland
