= Dromore Cathedral =

- The Cathedral Church of Christ the Redeemer
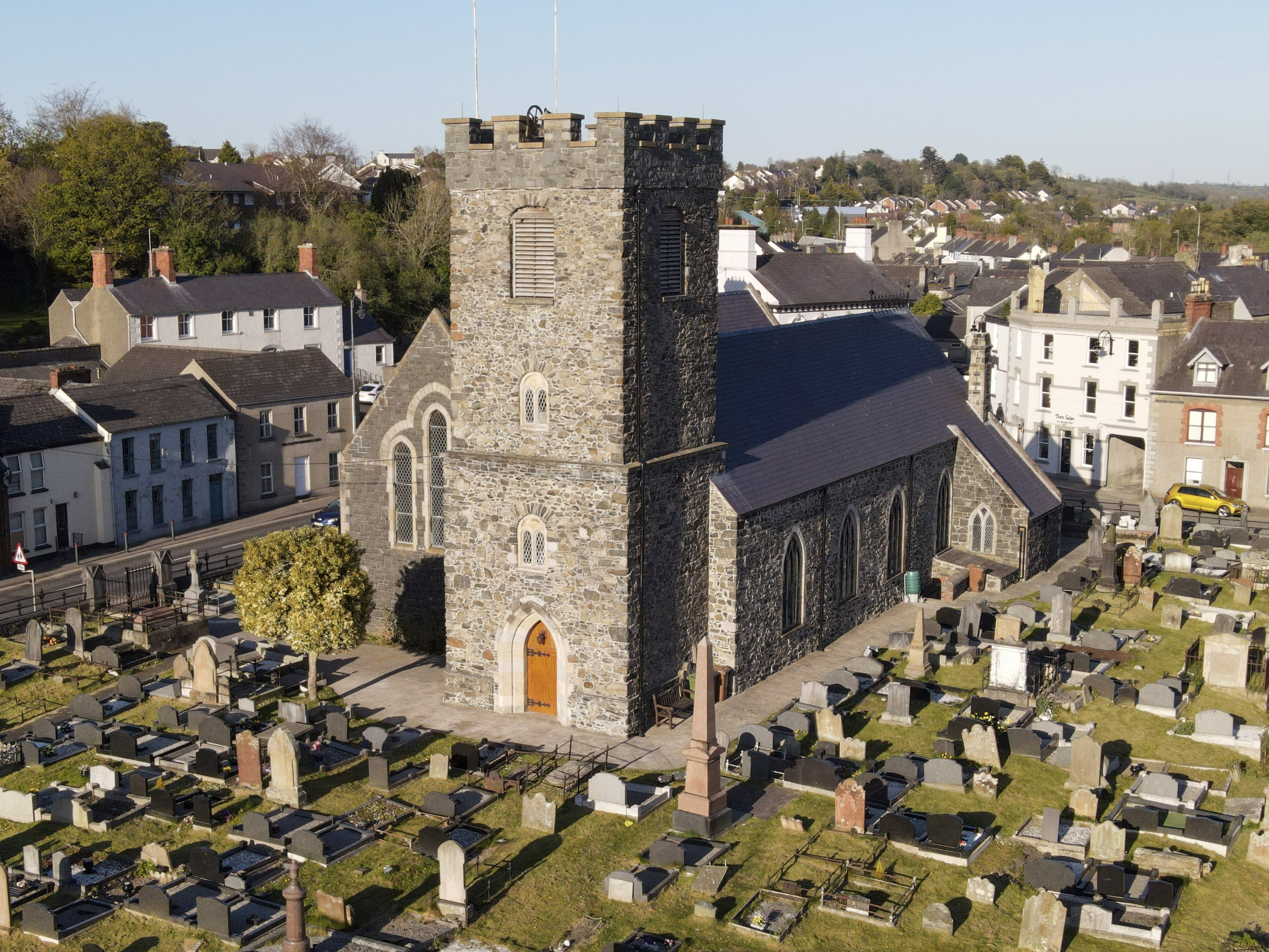
- Dromore Cathedral in 2021
- Dromore Cathedral
- 54°24′53″N 06°09′06″W
- Location: Dromore, County Down
- Country: Northern Ireland
- Denomination: Church of Ireland
- Churchmanship: Evangelical
- Website: https://www.dromorecathedral.org/

History
- Status: Open for Worship
- Founded: 510 AD by St Colman; 1609 AD by Letters Patent made a Cathedral
- Founder: St Colman of Dromore
- Dedicated: 510 AD
- Events: destroyed 1641, rebuilt 1661

Architecture
- Functional status: Christian Worship
- Heritage designation: Grade II Listed
- Architectural type: Gothic Revival
- Years built: 1661 to 1899
- Completed: 1661 to 1899

Specifications
- Capacity: c. 500

Administration
- Province: Province of Armagh
- Diocese: Diocese of Down and Dromore
- Deanery: Iveagh
- Parish: Dromore

Clergy
- Archbishop: Most Rev John McDowell
- Bishop: Rt Rev David McClay
- Rector: VACANT
- Dean: VACANT
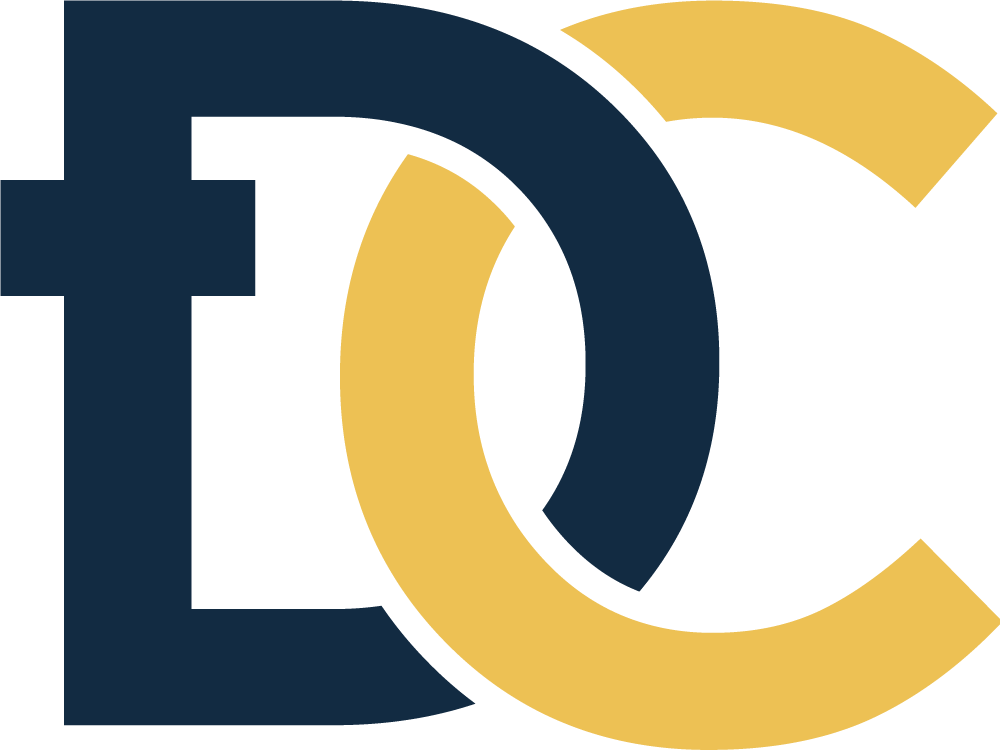

Dromore Cathedral, formally The Cathedral Church of Christ the Redeemer, Dromore, is one of two cathedral churches (the other is Down Cathedral) in the Diocese of Down and Dromore of the Church of Ireland (Anglican / Episcopal). It is situated in the small town of Dromore, County Down, Northern Ireland, in the ecclesiastical province of Armagh.

The cathedral is an active parish church with a wide demographic of about 600 families, but also serves an important role in Diocesan life. The pattern of worship reflects a wide range of tastes. The cathedral seeks to serve the community of Dromore by bringing Christ's compassion, love and hope of salvation to people of all ages. The mission is to grow God's Kingdom by being a centre of worship, healing and outreach to everyone in their community.

There is evidence of worship on the site since 510 AD, when St Colman of Dromore established a church on the banks of the River Lagan. The church was rebuilt numerous times in the 16th and 17th centuries and was made a cathedral by letters patent in 1609, before being destroyed by rebel insurgents in 1641. The present building was originally constructed in 1661 by Jeremy Taylor, Bishop of Down and Connor and has been expanded several times to its present size – the most recent section being added in 1899. The organ was installed by Conacher and Co. of Huddersfield in 1871 and rebuilt by Trevor Crowe of Donadea, County Kildare in 2008/9.

== History ==
The first church on the site was a wattle and daub building constructed by St Colman c. 510. This was replaced by a medieval church which was destroyed in the late 16th century. The church was again rebuilt and in 1609 elevated to the "Cathedral Church of Christ the Redeemer" by letters patent of James I. In 1641 this building, too, was destroyed. In the twelfth century, the English King Henry II revised a system of dioceses and bishops which covered the entire island of Ireland. One of those dioceses, named Dromore, took as its base this cathedral church. There had been bishops and abbots before then, but from this time the history becomes more complete.

A medieval church, about which no record exists, was destroyed in the late 1500s. It was King James I who, in 1609, issued letters patent giving the Church of St Colman a new title and a new status: The Cathedral Church of Christ the Redeemer, Dromore (known as Dromore Cathedral). That building was destroyed in 1641 by Irish insurgents.

In 1661, a narrow structure of around 20 ft (6.1 m) wide and 100 ft (30 m) long was first built. This forms the base of the current tower aisle. A tower was then built, but soon dismantled. The Percy aisle was added by Bishop Thomas Percy in 1811. This aisle sits at right angles to the Tower aisle, opposite the pulpit. A semi-circular sanctuary in memory of Bishop Jeremy Taylor was designed by Thomas Drew FRSA during the ministry of Canon Beresford Knox in 1870. The organ aisle and baptistry were added at the same time, creating an L-shaped building. Finally, the church was made rectangular with the addition of the Harding aisle parallel to the Tower aisle in 1899.

== Burials ==
- Jeremy Taylor (1613–1667), Bishop of Down and Connor
- Thomas Percy (1729–1811), Bishop of Dromore and ballad poet.

== See also ==
- Bishop of Dromore
- Dean of Dromore
- Diocese of Down and Dromore
  - Bishop of Down, Connor and Dromore
  - Bishop of Down and Connor
- List of cathedrals in Ireland
