= Isaac McConnell =

Isaac Henry McConnell was Archdeacon of Cork from 1945 until 1948.

He was educated at Trinity College, Dublin and ordained in 1901. After curacies in Kinsale and Clonmelhe held incumbencies at Desertserges and Cork. He was Treasurer of Cloyne Cathedral from 1935 to 1942 and then of Cork until his appointment as Archdeacon.

Religious titles
Preceded by Hedley Webster	Archdeacon of Cork; 1945–1948	Succeeded by James Henry Hingston
