= Samuel Kyle =

Samuel Kyle may refer to:

- Sam Kyle (1884–1962), Irish trade unionist and politician
- Samuel Kyle (bishop) (died 1848), Bishop of Cork and Ross, and of Cork, Cloyne and Ross
- Samuel Kyle (priest) (1801–1890), Archdeacon of Cork
