= Ellice Eadie =

Ellice Eadie CBE
- Born: Ellice Aylmer Hearn; 30 June 1912; Cork, Ireland
- Died: 31 March 2001 (aged 88); Winchester, Hampshire, England
- Education: Cheltenham Ladies' College; St Hugh's College, Oxford
- Occupations: Barrister; Civil service
- Years active: 1937–1978
- Spouse: John Eadie (m. 1946; died 1995)
- Parents: Robert Hearn (father); Mary Hearn (mother)

Ellice Aylmer Eadie CBE (née Hearn; 30 June 1912 – 31 March 2001) was an Irish-born English barrister and civil servant. She was called to the bar in 1937 and joined the Board of Trade's solicitor department nine years later. Eadie went to the Office of the Parliamentary Counsel in 1949, attaining promotion to become the first female under-secretary rank lawyer in the Civil Service as Deputy Counsel. She drafted laws and rules for the Supreme Court and was the first woman Standing Counsel to the General Synod of the Church of England.

== Biography ==
=== Early life ===
Eadie was born Ellice Aylmer Hearn at Edmonton, St Patrick's Hill, Cork on 30 June 1912, to Robert Hearn, the Church of Ireland clergyman and future Bishop of Cork, and gynaecologist Mary Ellice Hearn (née Cummins). One of her aunts was Ireland's first qualified professional engineer, and the family was versed in field hockey and rugby. Eadie was taught at Cheltenham Ladies' College, and began reading law at St Hugh's College, Oxford in 1931. She was taught by the university's first female law professor Agnes Headlam-Morley, and was awarded the Winter Williams law scholarship in the 1933 Michaelmas term. In 1934, Eadie earned her first class Bachelor of Arts degree and a first-class Bachelor of Civil Law degree in 1935. She took the first section of the bar examination in December 1935, earning a first in constitutional law, elements of contract law and tort law and legal history. Eadie also was second in criminal law and procedure and put into the first class (second in Order of Merit) of the final bar examinations, earning the three-year Lord Justice Holker senior scholarship.

=== Career ===
She was called to the bar by Gray's Inn on 26 January 1937 and was given the three-year Arden Scholarship. Eadie gave tuition to women law students at Oxford and was a pupil of Lincoln's Inn's Milner Holland and Richard Lee Metcalfe; she remained with Holland as his "devil" after completing her pupilage. In October 1939, Eadie joined the Office of the Parliamentary Counsel to the Treasury, becoming assistant to Harold Kent, the future Treasury Solicitor. She remained in the position for two years before joining the Women's Auxiliary Air Force (WAAF) in 1941. Eadie left the WAAF as a flight officer in 1946 and joined the Board of Trade's solicitor's department that same year. In 1949, she returned to the renamed Office of the Parliamentary Counsel, attaining promotion to Deputy Counsel seven years later, becoming the first female under-secretary rank lawyer in the Civil Service.

From 1960 to 1965, Eadie drafted the Supreme Court (general) rules, produced the matrimonial causes (amendment) rules, and revised the White Book on Supreme Court rules. She was appointed the CBE in 1965, and was attached to the Law Commission between 1965 and 1969, bringing about the passage of the Matrimonial Homes Act 1967 to protect the non-owning wife's right to stay in the matrimonial house and the Divorce Reform Act 1969 that aimed to radically reform divorce law. In 1968, Eadie was promoted to Parliamentary Counsel (deputy secretary rank), the first woman to hold the position. She drafted the Family Law Reform Act 1969, which lowered the age of majority from 21 to 18, introduced blood testing to establish disputed paternity. Eadie later drafted the Matrimonial Proceedings and Property Act 1970 that brought about improved support for a divorced spouse. She also worked on the Law Reform (Miscellaneous Provisions) Act 1970, the Highways, Licensing, and Attachment of Earnings Acts 1971, Superannuation, Affiliation Proceedings, and Maintenance Orders (Reciprocal Enforcement) Acts 1972 and the Friendly Societies Act 1974.

Eadie retired from the Civil Service in 1972. She was made the first female Standing Counsel to the General Synod of the Church of England and drafted the Ecclesiastical Offices (Age Limits) Measure of 1974 to require bishops in the Church of England and their counterparts to retire at age 70. Eadie also drafted the Patronage (Benefices) Measure of 1976, which modernised the process in which the successors of bishops were appointed. She formally retired in 1978 but remained busy as a church worker and treasurer of London's New Cavendish Club.

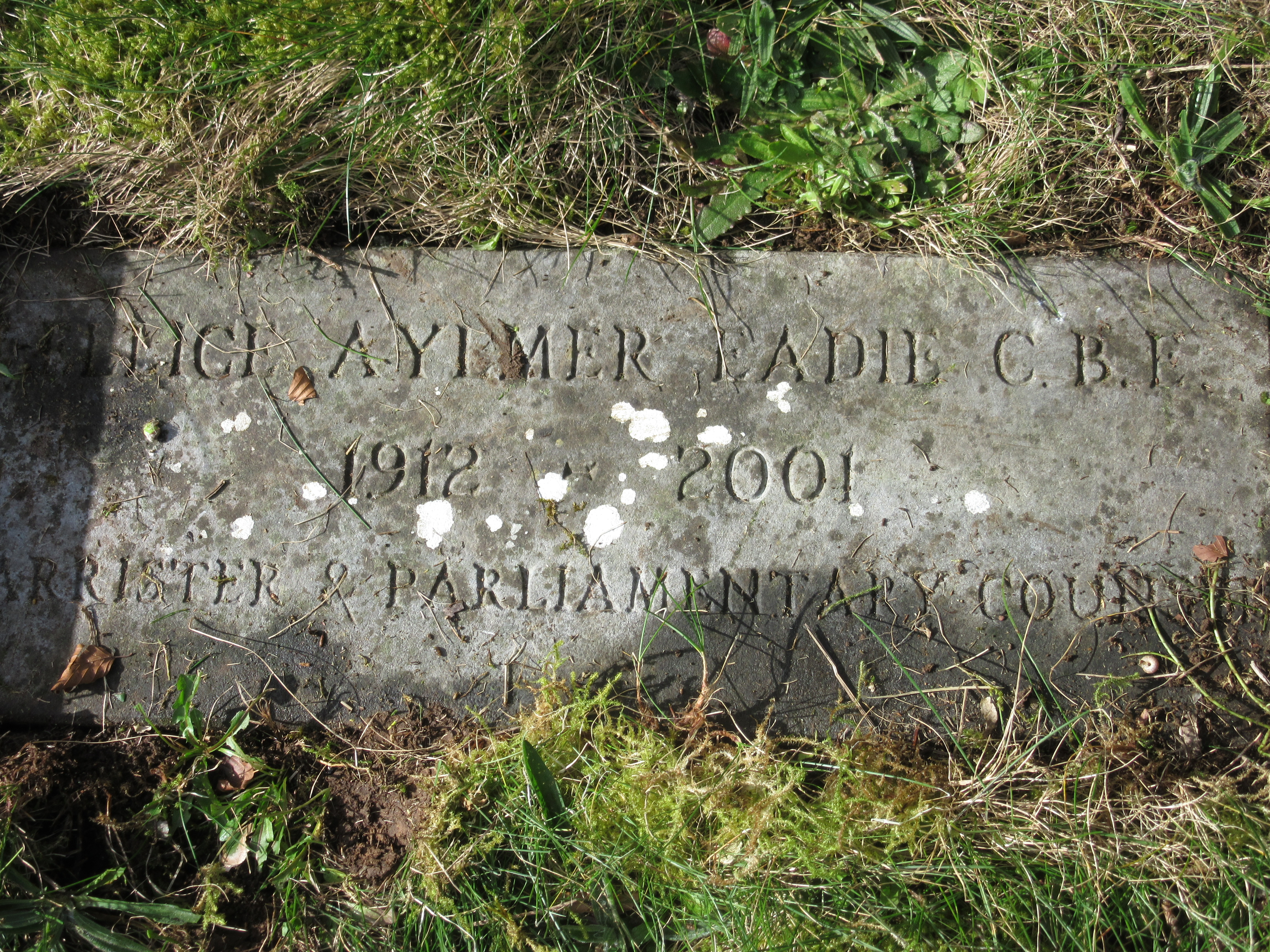

== Personal life ==
Eadie married the Canadian-born John Harold Ward Eadie (1908/9–1995) on 4 December 1946 and he predeceased her in 1995. The couple did not have children. Eadie moved to the Flowerdown Nursing Home, Winchester due to frailness in her final years, and died there from bronchopneumonia and cerebrovascular disease on 31 March 2001.

== Legacy ==
Ruth Deech, the author of Eadie's entry in the Oxford Dictionary of National Biography, described her as one who "unexpectedly become a champion of women seeking protection and freedom after failed marriages and a role model for other women in the law" in an era of radical law reform.
