= Flewett =

Flewett is an English surname. Notable people with the surname include:

- Thomas Henry Flewett (1922–2006), British virologist and academic
- William Flewett (1861–1938), Anglican bishop in Ireland

== See also ==
- Edward Flewett Darling (born 1933), Anglican bishop in Ireland
- Jill Freud, born June Beatrice Flewett (1927–2025), British actress and theatre director
