= Andrew Orr (priest) =

Anglican priest

- Church: Church of Ireland
- Diocese: Diocese of Cork, Cloyne and Ross
- Elected: 19 June 2026
- Predecessor: Paul Colton

Orders
- Ordination: 1992

Personal details
- Born: 1966 (age 59–60)
- Denomination: Anglicanism
- Education: Trinity College Dublin

Andrew Dermot Harman Orr (born 1966) is an Irish Anglican Bishop. He has served as Bishop of Cork, Cloyne and Ross in the Church of Ireland June 2026.

Orr was educated at Sullivan Upper School in Holywood, County Down, before studying Geology and Physical Geography at the University of Sheffield. He read theology at Trinity College Dublin and was ordained deacon in 1992 and priest in 1993. His first post was a curacy at Ballymacash. After that he held incumbencies at Castlecomer, Castleknock and Tullow. He served as Archdeacon of Ossory and Leighlin from 2014 to 2018, after which he was appointed Chaplain to Midleton College and Priest-in-Charge of Youghal Union of Parishes in the United Dioceses of Cork, Cloyne and Ross. In March 2023, Orr was appointed Archdeacon of Cork, Cloyne and Ross by the Right Rev. Dr Paul Colton, then Bishop of Cork, Cloyne and Ross. In June 2026, Orr was elected as Bishop of Cork, Cloyne and Ross in the Church of Ireland.
