= Stanistreet =

Stanistreet is a surname. Notable people with the surname include:

- Henry Stanistreet (1901–1981), Irish bishop
- John Stanistreet (1913–1971), Australian politician
- Michelle Stanistreet (born 1974), English trade unionist and journalist
