= William Chester (bishop) =

William Bennett Chester was a Church of Ireland bishop and author. Educated at Trinity College, Dublin, he was ordained in 1848. After a curacy in Kilrush he held incumbencies at Killead, Kilkee, Ballymackey, Nenagh and Birr. He was Chancellor then Archdeacon of Killaloe before his elevation to the episcopate in 1884. He died in post on 27 August 1893.

Church of Ireland titles
Preceded by William Fitzgerald	Bishop of Killaloe, Kilfenora, Clonfert and Kilmacduagh; 1884–1893	Succeeded by Frederick Richards Wynne
