= Bernard Packington =

Bernard Packington, D.D. was Archdeacon of Cork from 1662 until his resignation in 1674.
