= Andrew Orr =

Andrew Orr may refer to:

- Andrew Orr (priest), Irish Anglican priest
- Sir Andrew Orr (stationer), Scottish wholesale stationer and Lord Provost of Glasgow
- Andrew Picken Orr, Scottish oceanographer
