= Henry de Thrapston =

English cleric

Henry de Thrapston, or Henry Trapeston (died c.1333) was an English cleric, judge and Crown official who spent most of his career in Ireland, where he became Chancellor of the Exchequer of Ireland and Archdeacon of Cork.

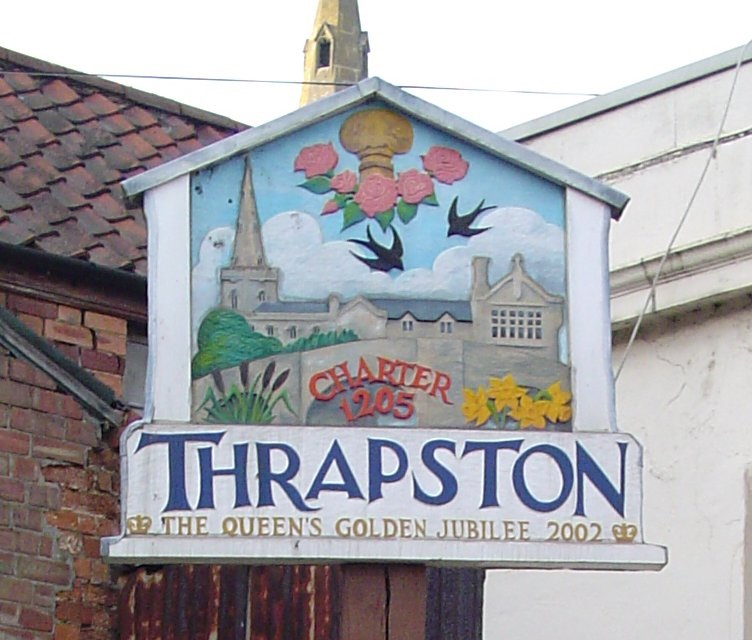
Thrapston, present day

He was born at Thrapston in Northamptonshire. By 1300, he was already a senior Crown official, and his Irish career began around 1301. He frequently returned to England, where he had a number of official duties, such as keeper of the lands of the Royal favourite Hugh Despenser the Elder. He was also entrusted with arresting the attendees at a tournament (presumably illegal) in Staffordshire.

In Ireland, he became custodian of the writs and rolls of the Court of the Justiciar of Ireland in 1301 at a salary of £5 a year. An order in the Close Rolls for 1302 survives, directing payment to him of 50 shillings in part payment of his salary, and there is a similar order in 1306, as his salary was now seriously in arrears. He was a witness to the marriage contract between Robert Dardyz and Matilda Rochfort in 1303; an interesting detail is that Robert bound himself to pay his wife 200 marks in case the couple were divorced.

In 1307, he was superseded as custodian of the Writs by Nicholas Wynley, and ordered to hand all the records of the custodian's office over to him. He was given a temporary reappointment in 1310 "in the present eyre (judicial circuit) of County Dublin" (this was one of the last Irish eyres). He made several return visits to England, whether on official or personal business is not clear. He was appointed second Baron of the Court of Exchequer (Ireland) "during pleasure" in 1328. He was appointed Chancellor of the Exchequer in 1330 so long as he was of good behaviour, and "so long as his bodily health allowed". This was presumably a reference to his advancing years and ill health. He held the office for about three years, being replaced by Thomas de Brayles in 1333.

He was something of a pluralist: in addition to being Archdeacon of Cork he was parish priest of Mallow, County Cork, and of Gamston, Rushcliffe, Nottinghamshire.

== Sources ==
- Ball, F. Elrington The Judges in Ireland 1221-1921 London John Murray 1926
- Close Rolls Edward I and II
- Patent Rolls Edward III
