= Bishop Darling =

Bishop Darling may refer to two bishops in the Anglican communion:

- Barbara Darling (1947–2015), bishop in the Anglican Church of Australia from 2008
- Edward Darling (born 1933), Bishop of Limerick and Killaloe, Ireland, from 1985 to 2000
