= GH episodes =

GH Episodes may refer to:

- Episodes of General Hospital, an American daytime soap opera which has run on ABC since 1963
- Episodes of General Hospital (UK TV series), a British daytime soap opera produced by ATV which ran on ITV from 1972 to 1979
- Episodes of Ghost Hunters, an American drama-documentary series ran on Syfy/the Sci Fi Channel since 2004
- Episodes of Ghosthunters, a British documentary series ran on the Discovery Channel from 1996 to 1997
