= James Wilson (bishop) =

Irish bishop

James Wilson (1780-1857) was an Irish bishop of the Church of Ireland.

Wilson was born near Newry, County Down to James Wilson, a merchant, and was brought up there. He studied at Trinity College Dublin starting in 1798, becoming a Scholar in 1800, graduating BA (1802), MA (1809) and later LLD (1830). For seventeen years he was Curate at St. Audoen's Church, Dublin. Later he was Rector of Killinane and Chancellor of Leighlin, posts he held until his elevation to the episcopate.

He was nominated to the vacant post of Bishop of Cork on 24 June 1848 and consecrated on 30 July 1848 following the death of the previous incumbent, Samuel Kyle.

In 1822 he was elected a member of the Royal Irish Academy.

Religious titles
Preceded by Samuel Kyle	Bishop of Cork, Cloyne and Ross; 1848– 1857	Succeeded by William Fitzgerald
