= Francis Alexander FitzGerald =

Irish barrister and judge

Francis Alexander FitzGerald (1807–1897) was an Irish barrister and judge, who had a distinguished legal career. He resigned from the Bench in unusual circumstance, on a point of principle.

He was the third son of Maurice FitzGerald (died 1838), Royal Physician to the British Crown at Madras, India, and his second wife Mary Burton, daughter of Edward William Burton. William FitzGerald, Bishop of Killaloe and Clonfert (1814–1883), was his youngest brother.

== Early life ==
He was born on 5 June 1807 in Madras, India; his family moved back to Ireland when he was a young boy and settled in County Limerick. He went to a local school in Limerick and then Trinity College Dublin where he took his B.A. with a gold medal in 1827. He entered Middle Temple the same year, and was called to the Irish Bar in 1834.

== Career ==
He was regarded as a fine common lawyer, but his greatest expertise was in the field of equity: it was said that his arguments were so subtle that no judge could refute them. He was never appointed a Law Officer and seems to have had little interest in politics, although he would occasionally take a brief for the defence in political trials, notably that of William Smith O'Brien in 1848. He took silk in 1849, and was a Bencher of the King's Inns. He was spoken of as a possible Lord Chancellor of Ireland, but was passed over, no doubt on account of his Irish nationality, as it was then the practice only to appoint English lawyers to that office. He became third Baron of the Court of Exchequer (Ireland), and following the reorganisation of the Irish Courts system in 1877, continued to sit as a judge of the Exchequer Division of the new High Court of Justice in Ireland. It was said that he was offered a seat on the new Irish Court of Appeal, but refused, as he believed that judges should not seek promotion.

== Resignation ==
FitzGerald resigned from the Bench in 1882; according to V.T.H. Delaney this was in protest at the enactment of the Prevention of Crime (Ireland) Act 1882, which provided for trial by judge without a jury in cases of capital crime. All the Irish High Court judges objected to this provision, stating in a joint letter to the Lord Lieutenant of Ireland that its enactment would greatly damage public confidence in the administration of justice; but in the wake of the Phoenix Park Murders, public opinion on all matters of law and order was strongly on the Government's side. The Act passed into law with the controversial clause intact (although it was never used in practice), and FitzGerald, who was known as a man of high principles, felt sufficiently strongly about the matter to resign.

FitzGerald died in 1897.

== Family ==
Francis Alexander FitzGerald married Janet Burton, daughter of Major Charles Burton of Williamstown, Blackrock, Dublin. Their children included:

- Margaret, who married Gerald FitzGibbon, one of the outstanding Irish judges of his generation.
- Charles Edward Fitzgerald M.D. (1843-1916), President of the Royal College of Physicians of Ireland.

They were members of the Church of Ireland.

== Arms ==
Coat of arms of Francis Alexander FitzGerald

Crest
A boar passant Gules bristled and armed Or.
Escutcheon
Ermine a saltire Gules.
Motto
Shanid À Boo

== See also ==
- Capital punishment in Ireland
- Phoenix Park Murders
