= Dacre Hamilton Powell =

Dacre Hamilton Powell was Archdeacon of Cork from 1899 until 1912.

Powell was born in Portarlington and educated at Trinity College, Dublin. He was ordained in 1868 and began his career with a curacy at Carrigaline. He also served at Fermoy, Cork, Macroom and Shandon.
