= The Altar Church =

Church in West Cork built by the poor during the Great Famine

- The Church of the Poor
- Teampol na mBocht
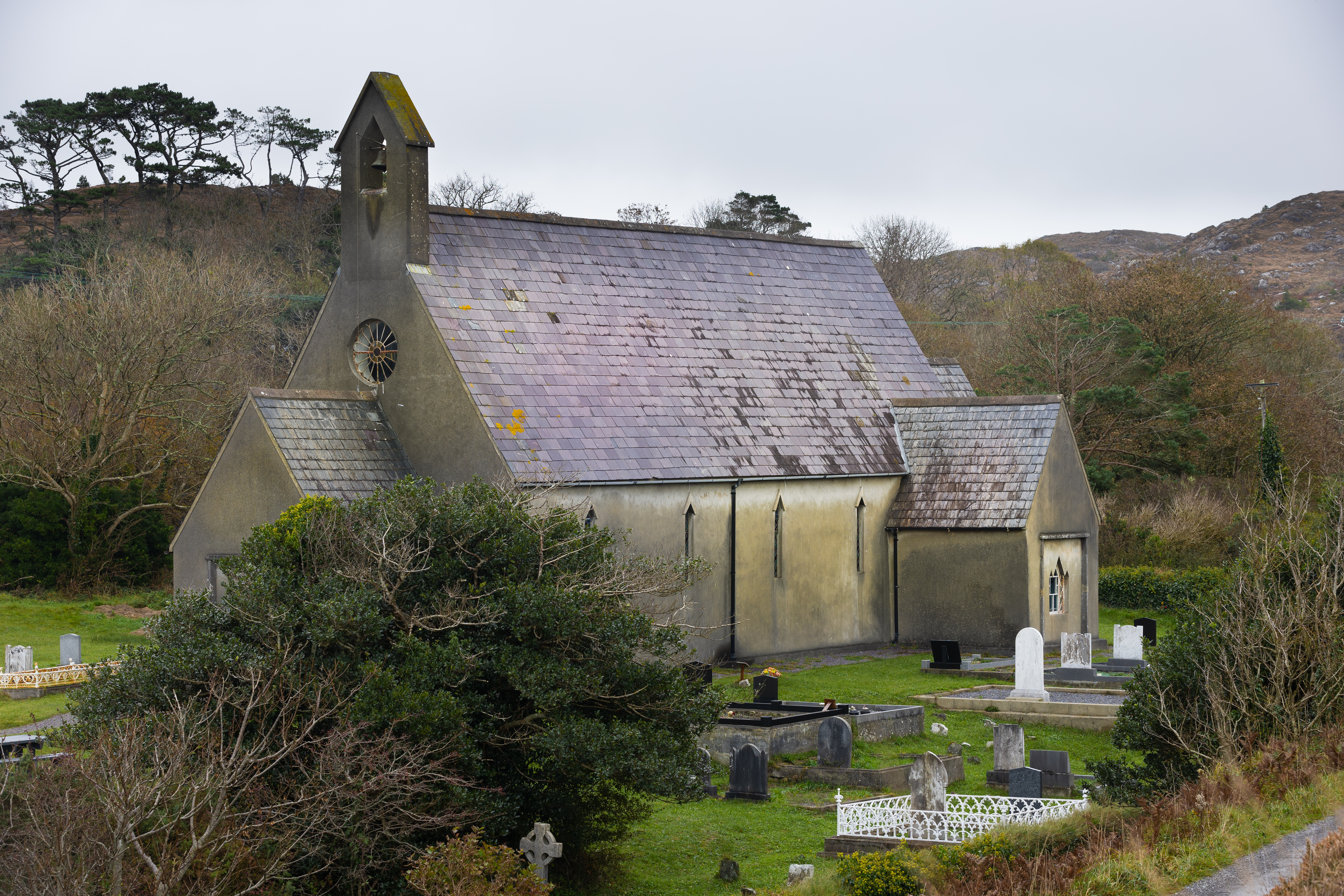
- Church of the Poor
- The Altar Church
- 51.52001°N 9.64209°W
- Country: Ireland
- Denomination: Church of Ireland

History
- Founder: Rev. William Fisher
- Dedicated: 1847

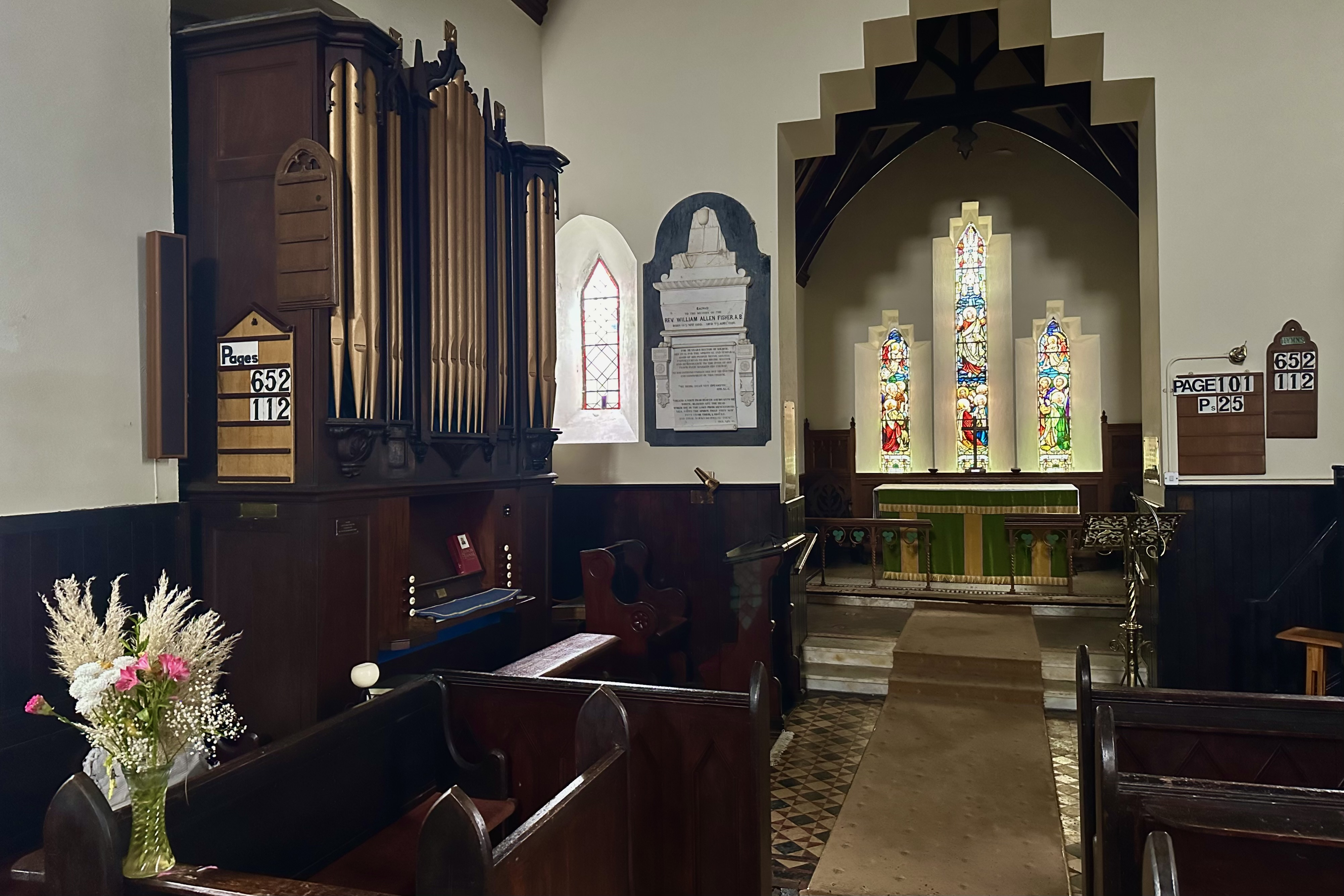
Inside the church. Stone with inscription dedicated to rev. Fisher visible on the left

The Altar Church, or The Church of The Poor (Irish: Teampol na mBocht), is a small Church of Ireland church in Toormore village in County Cork in Ireland.

The church was built in 1847 as a famine relief effort to support the local poor. The initiative was led by the Rev. William Allen Fisher, a local priest and landowner (who later in 1876 was registered as owning 257 acres of land worth 75 pounds and 10 shillings), and it was him who gave the church the name "The Church of the Poor". The church was known under multiple names, including the Poor Man's Church, Teampol na Muck (Church of the Pigs), Fisher's Church and most recently Altar Church. It was also the only Church of Ireland church with an official Irish name (Teampol na mBocht).

It has never been established if the support from Rev. Fisher was a genuine act of relief to the locals in the times of the Great Hunger, an act of souperism to gain new followers to the Church of Ireland from among the local Catholic community, or a mix of both. Regardless of motives, it is known that all work on the church was done by hand, including carrying of locally quarried stones, to promote the poorest and exclude from the effort the "stronger" farmers who owned horses and carts. It is also agreed that the pastor managed to convert as many as five hundred people to Protestantism.

The church's certain unusual architectural features are attributed to the unqualified workforce used in its construction. Door and window openings have straight triangular, rather than arch, tops; while the walls are rendered with plain smooth rendering. Triangular shapes dominate both the exterior and the interior of the church. There is also a mediaeval baptismal font inside.

In 1947, a special service was held to mark the centenary of the church, with a large congregation and clergy attending, including Robert Hearn, the Bishop of Cork, Cloyne and Ross. Still before the ceremony, the church had been redecorated, and during the anniversary a new door gifted from the U.S. was dedicated by the bishop.

In 1997, 150th anniversary was celebrated with Robert Warke, the Bishop of Cork, Cloyne and Ross, visiting, and concerts and talks centered around the subject of famine taking place. In early 2000s, the area around the church was furnished with public lighting.
