= Edward Meade =

William Edward Meade (24 February 1832 – 12 October 1912) was a Bishop of Cork, Cloyne and Ross.

Born in county Cork, where his father William was a clergyman, he attended school in Midleton and then university at Trinity College, Dublin, becoming a Scholar in 1856, and earning BA in mathematics 1857, and MA in 1860. He was ordained in 1863. In 1873 he became a Bachelor (BD) and a Doctor of Divinity (DD).

He was Rector of Ardtrea and then Archdeacon of Armagh from 1885 until his elevation to the episcopate in 1893.

He married Mary Ferrier, the daughter of Fleetwood Churchill of Dublin.

== See also ==
Church of Ireland titles
Preceded by Robert Gregg	Bishop of Cork, Cloyne and Ross; June 1893 – December 1912	Succeeded by Charles Dowse
