= Traitor's Ford =

Ford on the River Stour in Warwickshire, England

- Ford
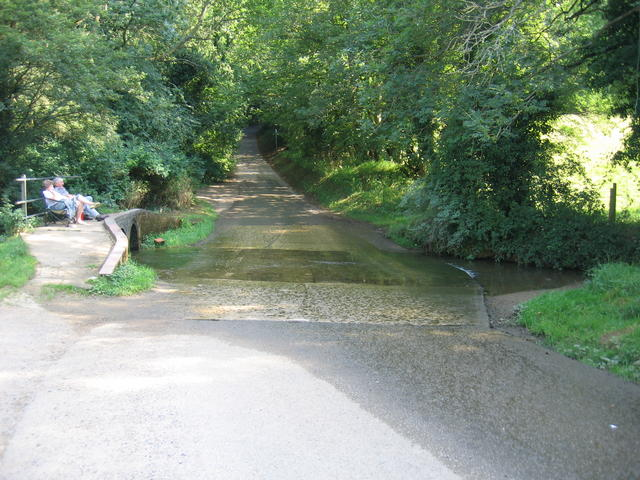

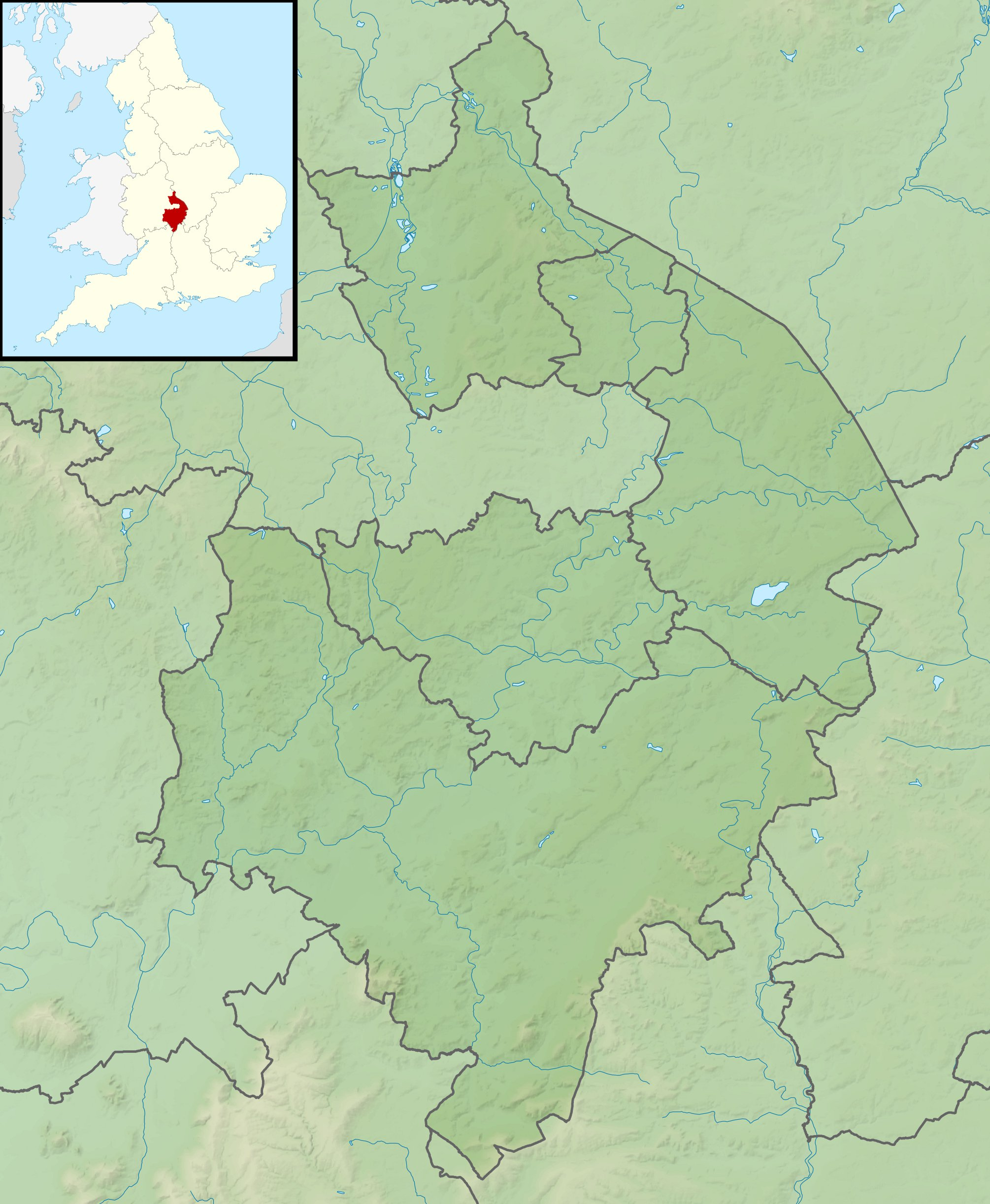
- Location within Warwickshire
- Coordinates: 52°01′31″N 1°30′40″W
- Location: Warwickshire, England

Traitor's Ford is a ford on the River Stour, in the English county of Warwickshire close to its border with Oxfordshire. It is about 2 miles (3.2 km) outside Brailes and half a mile from the village of Sibford Gower, and is on the route of the Macmillan Way long distance footpath. The ford can be seen in the film Three Men and a Little Lady.

Immediately to the north of the ford, the modern road of Traitor's Ford Lane meets with Ditchedge Lane, a track that is believed to be an ancient trading route. One theory for the naming of the ford is that the name was originally Trader's Ford, named because of its location on this trading route.

Another theory is that a traitor was hung here following the Civil War battle of Edgehill, when several local Parliamentarian sympathisers were executed by Royalists.

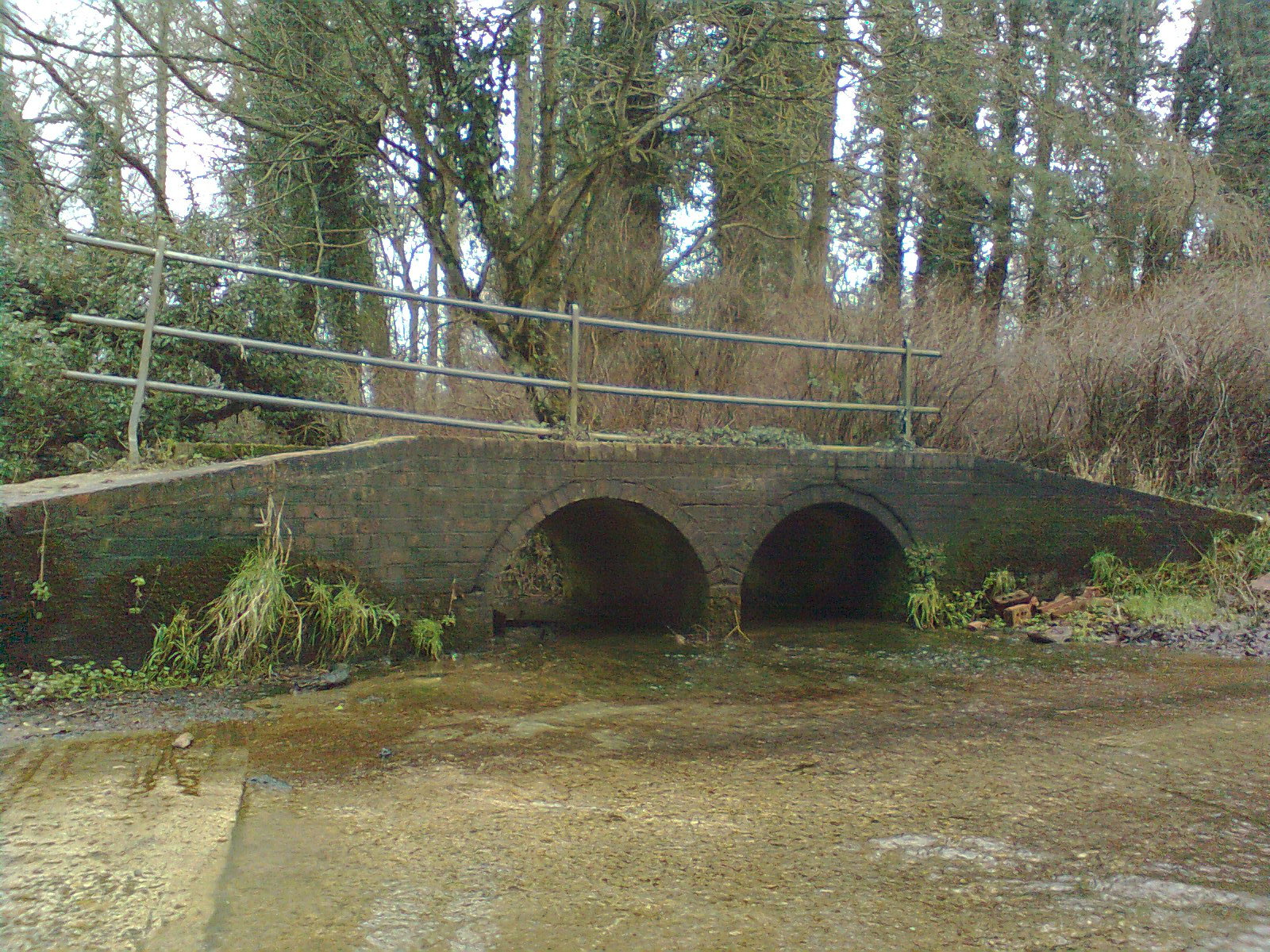
The footbridge

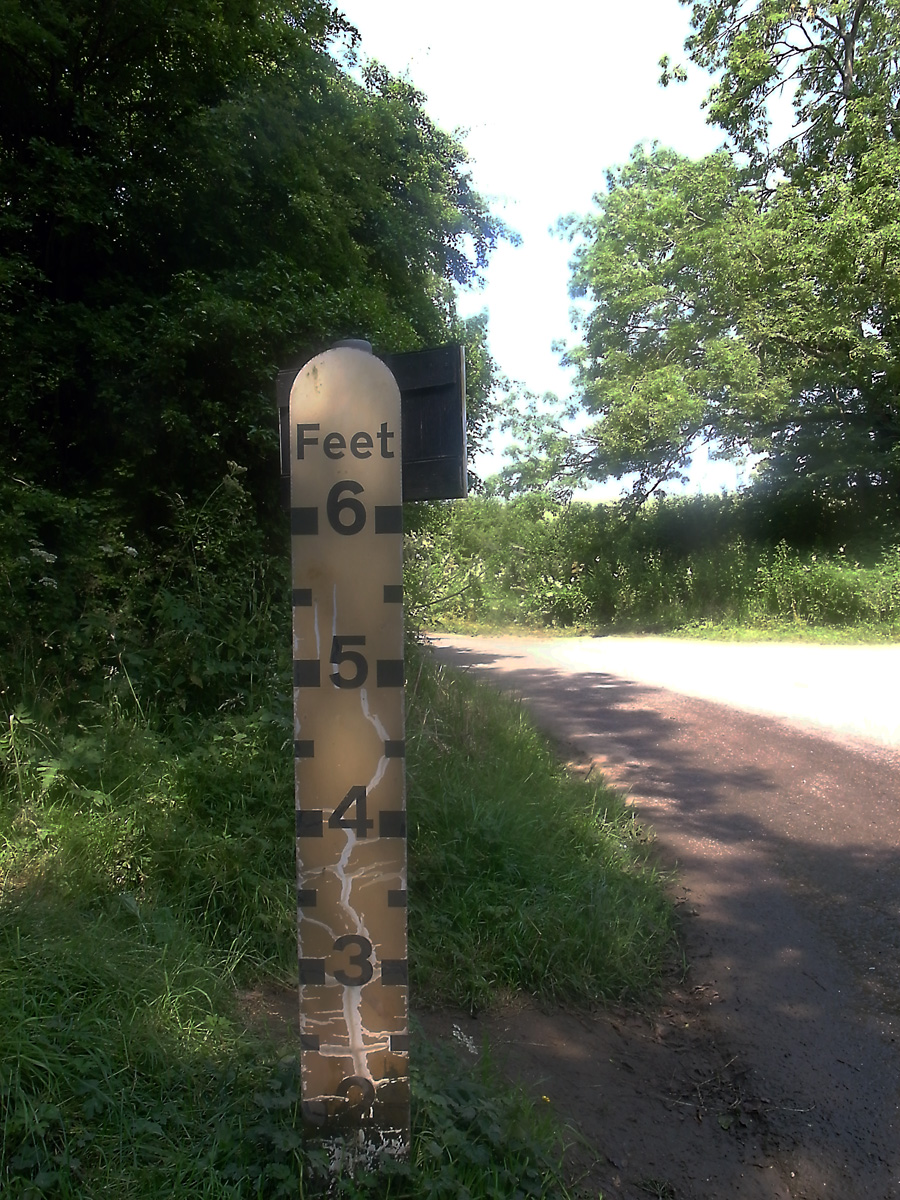
The depth gauge

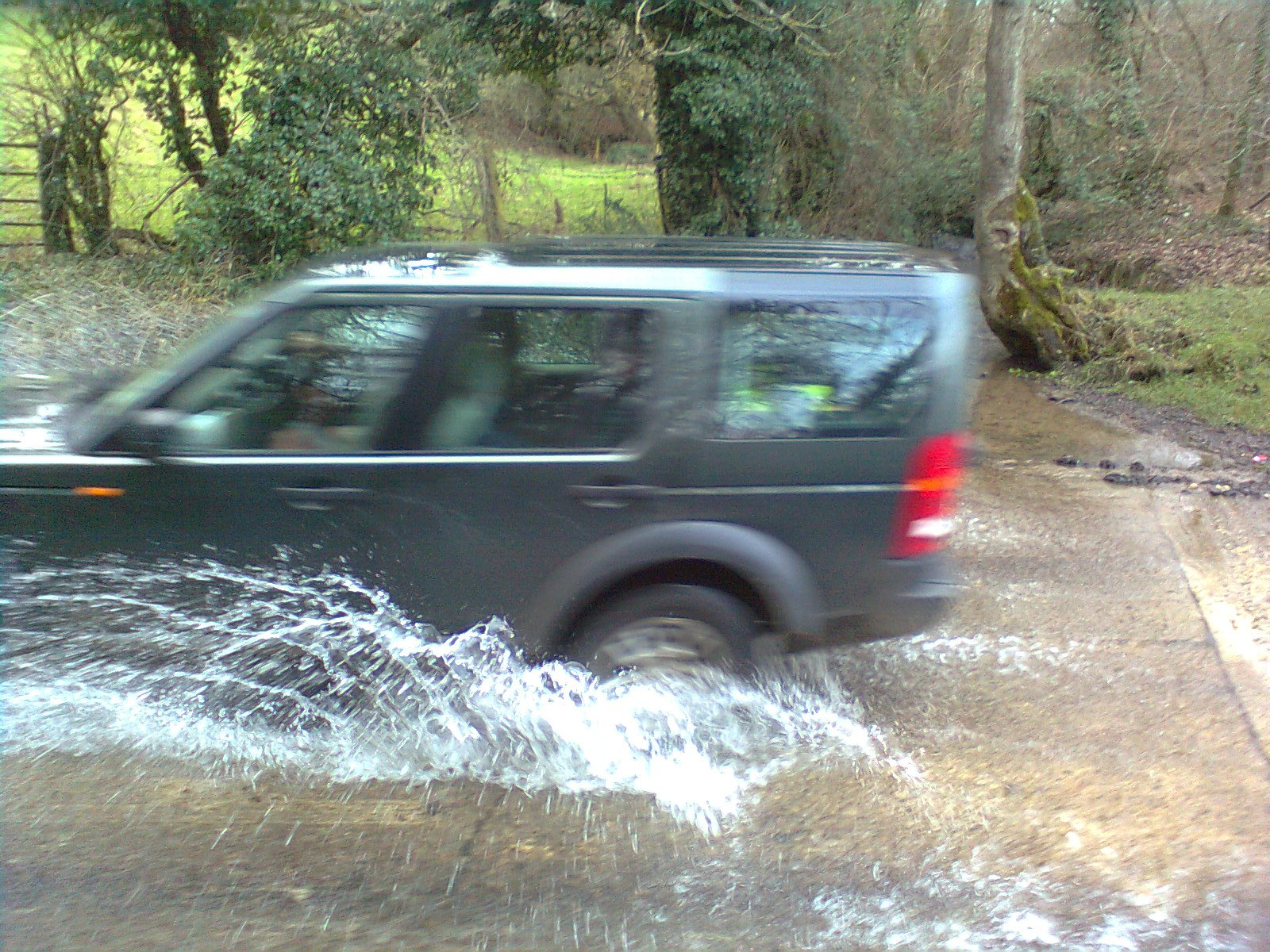
A car using the ford
