= Henry Patton =

Irish Anglican bishop (1867–1943)

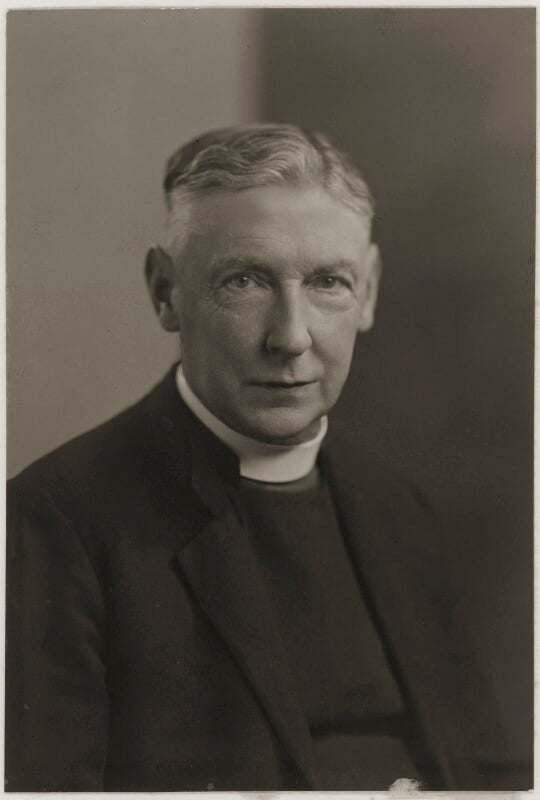
Patton, c. 1920s

Henry Edmund Patton (1 July 1867 – 28 April 1943) was the 10th Bishop of Killaloe, Kilfenora, Clonfert and Kilmacduagh.

Educated at Trinity College, Dublin and ordained in 1892, his first post was as Chaplain to the Lord Lieutenant of Dublin. Later he held incumbencies at Donaghpatrick, Blackrock and Birr before his ordination to the episcopate in 1924. He died in post.

Church of Ireland titles
Preceded by Thomas Sterling Berry	Bishop of Killaloe, Kilfenora, Clonfert and Kilmacduagh; 1924–1943	Succeeded by Robert McNeil Boyd
