= Samuel Kyle (priest) =

Irish religious figure (1801-1890)

Samuel Moore Kyle (1801–1890) was Archdeacon of Cork from 1833 until 1876.

Kyle was the eldest son of Bishop Samuel Kyle. He was born in Dublin and educated at Trinity College, Dublin. He was ordained in 1825 and began his career with a curacy at Urglin. He was Treasurer of Leighlin from 1828 to 1832 and his appointment as archdeacon.
