= Edwin Owen =

Irish Anglican bishop (1910-2005)

The Right Reverend Edwin Owen, MA
- Bishop of Limerick and Killaloe
- Province: Dublin
- Diocese: Limerick and Killaloe
- Elected: 21 September 1976
- Term ended: 6 January 1981
- Successor: Walton Empey
- Previous post: Bishop of Killaloe and Clonfert

Orders
- Ordination: 1935
- Consecration: 9 January 1972

Personal details
- Born: 3 November 1910
- Died: 2 April 2005 (aged 94)
- Denomination: Church of Ireland

Edwin Owen (3 November 1910 – 2 April 2005) was an Anglican bishop in the Church of Ireland.

Owen was educated at The Royal School, Armagh and Trinity College, Dublin. He was ordained in 1935 and was a curate at both Glenageary and Christ Church, Leeson Park, Dublin. He was a minor canon of St Patrick’s Cathedral, Dublin and then chancellor’s vicar and finally succentor. From 1942 to 1957 he was the incumbent at Birr and then Dean of Killaloe Cathedral until 1972. He was elected as the Bishop of Killaloe and Clonfert on 1 December 1971 and was consecrated on 25 January 1972. In 1976, the sees of Killaloe and Clonfert were united to those of Limerick, Ardfert and Aghadoe, forming the current Diocese of Limerick and Killaloe, with Owen elected as Bishop of Limerick and Killaloe on 21 September 1976 and enthroned on 5 December 1976. He retired on 6 January 1981.

== Bibliography ==
- Fryde, E. B.; Greenway, D. E.; Porter, S.; Roy, I., eds. (1986). Handbook of British Chronology (3rd, reprinted 2003 ed.). Cambridge: Cambridge University Press. ISBN 0-521-56350-X.
- Moody, T. W.; Martin, F. X.; Byrne, F. J., eds. (1984). Maps, Genealogies, Lists: A Companion to Irish History, Part II. New History of Ireland. Vol. XI. Oxford: Oxford University Press. ISBN 0-19-821745-5.

Church of Ireland titles
Preceded by Henry Arthur Stanistreet	Bishop of Killaloe and Clonfert; 1972–1976	Last appointment
New title	Bishop of Limerick and Killaloe; 1976–1981	Succeeded by Walton Newcombe Francis Empey
