= Samuel Kyle (bishop) =

Irish bishop

The Right Reverend Samuel Kyle

26th Provost of Trinity College Dublin
- In office 1 August 1820 – 30 July 1831
- Preceded by: Thomas Elrington
- Succeeded by: Bartholomew Lloyd

Personal details
- Born: 5 March 1770 Derry, Ireland
- Died: 18 May 1848 (aged 78) Westminster, London, England
- Party: Tory
- Children: Samuel
- Education: Trinity College Dublin

Samuel Kyle (5 March 1770 – 18 May 1848) was an Irish bishop of the Church of Ireland who served as the 26th Provost of Trinity College Dublin from 1820 to 1831.

== Early and personal life ==
Kyle was born in Derry in 1770. He was educated at Trinity College Dublin. His eldest son, Samuel Moore Kyle, became Archdeacon of Cork.

== Career ==
He was Provost of Trinity College Dublin from 1820 to 1831, Bishop of Cork and Ross from 1831 to 1835 and Bishop of Cork, Cloyne and Ross from then until his death on 18 May 1848.

== Notes ==
Academic offices
Preceded by Thomas Elrington	Provost of Trinity College Dublin; 1820–1831	Succeeded by Bartholomew Lloyd
Church of Ireland titles
Preceded by Hon. Thomas St Lawrence	Bishop of Cork and Ross; 1831–1835	Succeeded by Became; Bishop of Cork, Cloyne and Ross
Preceded by Inaugural appointment	Bishop of Cork, Cloyne and Ross; 1835–1848	Succeeded by James Wilson
