= James Hingston =

James Henry Hingston (b Blackrock 28 Nov 1884 - d Cork 6 November) was Archdeacon of Cork from 1948 until 1954.

He was educated at Trinity College, Dublin and ordained in 1908. After curacies in Tudeley and Clonmelhe held incumbencies at Ballymartle, Kilshannig and Cork. He was Precentor of Cloyne Cathedral from 1946 until his appointment as Archdeacon.
