= Ashley Cummins (rugby union) =

Irish rugby union player

William Cummins
- Full name: William Edward Ashley Cummins
- Born: 4 February 1858 Blackrock, Cork, Ireland
- Died: 18 October 1923 (aged 65) Woodville, Cork, Ireland
- Notable relative(s): Jane Cummins (daughter); Mary Cummins (daughter); Geraldine Cummins (daughter); Iris Cummins (daughter)

Rugby union career
- Position: Forward
International career
Years	Team	Apps	(Points)
1879–82	Ireland	3	(0)

William Edward Ashley Cummins (4 February 1858 — 18 October 1923) was an Irish international rugby union player.

Born in Cork, Cummins was educated at University College Cork and Queen's College Belfast. He appeared occasionally in rugby international for Ireland during his tertiary studies, gaining three caps as a forward.

Cummins remained based in Cork through his medical career. He was Professor of Practice of Medicine at University College Cork and a senior surgeon at the City of Cork Hospital for Women and Children.

Raising 11 children, Cummins had two sons follow him into medicine, as did his daughters Jane and Mary. His eldest daughter was the Irish playwright Geraldine Cummins. Another daughter, Iris Cummins, was University College Cork's first female engineering graduate.

== See also ==
- List of Ireland national rugby union players
