= Jane Cummins =

Doctor who served with the Royal Air Force Medical Services (1899-1982)

- Born: Jane Grace Evans-Freke Cummins; 10 May 1899; Cork, Ireland
- Died: 1 August 1982 (aged 83); Warlingham, Sussex, UK
- Occupation: Physician
- Father: Ashley Cummins
- Relatives: Geraldine Cummins - Novelist and playwright/dramatist (elder sister); Mary Hearn - Gynaecologist (elder sister); Iris Cummins - Engineer (younger sister)

Jane Grace Evans-Freke Cummins (later Miller; 10 May 1899 – 1 August 1982) was an Irish doctor who served with the Royal Air Force Medical Services during the Second World War.

== Early life and education ==
Cummins was born on 10 May 1899 in Cork to William Edward Ashley Cummins (1858–1923), Professor of Medicine at University College Cork (UCC), and Jane Constable Cummins (née Hall). They had five daughters and six sons. Geraldine Cummins was a playwright, Iris Cummins was an engineer, and Mary Hearn was a gynaecologist and fellow of the RCPI. Two of her brothers also became doctors, and one, Nicholas Marshall Cummins, was involved in setting up the first blood transfusion service in Cork.

Cummins' distinct name comes from her mother's grandmother, Jane Grace Evans-Freke, who was born in 1775 and married Sir Fenton Aylmer, 7th Baronet of Donodea Castle in 1795.

== Medical career ==
Cummins began her study in UCC and graduating with degrees in Surgery, Medicine and Obstetric Arts by 1923. She went on to complete a Diploma in Medical Radiology and Electrology in 1928.

Cummins went to work for the Colonial Medical Service on the Gold Coast in 1930. She also completed her Diploma of Public Health that year. Cummins graduated in 1932 with a Diploma in Tropical Medicine and Hygiene in London. During the Second World War, Cummins was a squadron officer for the Royal Air Force Medical Services. After the war, she focused on child care clinics and in Tuberculosis, becoming a physician in the Camberwell Chest Clinic in London.

== Family ==
Cummins married accountant David McFarlane Miller in 1934. He died in 1965. They had two sons, one became an accountant and the other a doctor. She died at Warlingham Park Hospital in 1982.
