= Richard Perdue =

Richard Gordon Perdue (13 February 1910 – 8 August 1998) was an Anglican bishop.

Perdue was educated at Trinity College, Dublin, and ordained in 1934. After curacies at Drumcondra and Rathmines he was the incumbent at Castledermot and then Archdeacon of Killaloe and Kilfenora. He was ordained to the episcopate as the Bishop of Killaloe, Kilfenora, Clonfert and Kilmacduagh in 1953 and translated to be the Bishop of Cork, Cloyne and Ross in 1957. He retired in 1978.

Church of Ireland titles
Preceded by Hedley Webster	Bishop of Killaloe, Kilfenora, Clonfert and Kilmacduagh; 1953 – 1957	Succeeded by Henry Arthur Stanistreet
Preceded by George Otto Simms	Bishop of Cork, Cloyne and Ross; 1957– 1978	Succeeded by Samuel Greenfield Poyntz
