= Charles Dowse =

Charles Benjamim Dowse (21 September 1862 – 13 January 1934) was the Bishop of Killaloe, Kilfenora, Clonfert and Kilmacduagh who soon after his consecration in June 1912 was translated to Cork.

Born on 21 September 1862 into an ecclesiastical family and educated at Trinity College, Dublin, he was ordained in 1885. His first posts were curacies at St. Catherine's Church, Dublin; Christ Church, Gorey and St Matthias Church, Dublin. After these he was Vicar of Christ Church, Dublin from 1900 to 1912; and professor of Pastoral Theology at his old college from 1907. In June 1912 he was elevated to the episcopate, serving until September 1933. He died on 13 January 1934, leaving estate valued at £3,853 net.

Church of Ireland titles
Preceded by Mervyn Archdall	Bishop of Killaloe, Kilfenora, Clonfert and Kilmacduagh; June 1912 –December 1912	Succeeded by Sterling Berry
Preceded by Edward Meade	Bishop of Cork, Cloyne and Ross; 1912 –1934	Succeeded by William Flewett
