= John Whetham =

Irish dean

John Whetham (1733/4–1796), DD, a graduate of Exeter College, Oxford was Dean of Lismore from 1791 until 1796: he was also Archdeacon of Cork from 1793 and died at Clifton, Bristol on 1 May 1796.
