= Mary Hearn =

Gynaecologist and first female fellow of the Royal College of Physicians of Ireland

- Born: Mary Ellice Thorn Hearn; 25 February 1891; Cork, Ireland
- Died: 3 June 1969 (aged 78); Cork, Ireland
- Occupation: Gynaecologist
- Spouse: Robert Thomas Hearn (m. 1911)
- Father: Ashley Cummins
- Family: Geraldine Cummins (older sister), Iris Cummins (younger sister), Jane Cummins (younger sister)

Mary Ellice Thorn Hearn M.D. F.R.C.P.I. (25 February 1891 – 1969) was a gynaecologist and first female fellow of the Royal College of Physicians of Ireland.

== Early life and education ==
Hearn was born on 25 February 1891 to William Edward Ashley Cummins (1858–1923), Professor of Medicine at University College Cork, and Jane Constable Cummins (née Hall) in Cork. They had five daughters and six sons. Geraldine Cummins was a playwright. Jane Cummins was a squadron officer in the WRAF during the second world war and became a medical doctor. Iris Cummins was an engineer. Two of her brothers also became doctors, and one, N. Marshall Cummins, was involved in setting up the first blood transfusion service in Cork.

== Education ==
Hearn began to study medicine in UCC, however she left in 1911 to get married. With the encouragement of her husband, she returned to UCC, and graduated with an MB, B.Ch., BAO in 1919 with first-class honours and a distinction in medicine despite having had her son who also attended her conferring ceremony. Hearn went on to gain her MD in 1922, when she was awarded first place and a special distinction in the examination.

== Work ==
Hearn worked as house surgeon and house physician for the Cork North Infirmary in Cork until 1922 when she was appointed to the Victoria Hospital Cork in 1922 as an honorary anaesthetist. The following year she joined the staff as assistant medical officer and then as the medical officer. Hearn was running a private gynaecological practice near Shandon, Cork during this time as well as working with the Lapp's Charity, Cork. In 1922 Hearn got membership of the RCPI, and on 18 October 1924 became the first woman to become a fellow of the college. Hearn maintained her qualification through postgraduate courses held in London every year until 1968.

An interesting side note about her is that her letter returning her fee for successfully sitting the membership examination for the RCPI was travelling through the GPO when it was damaged by the Irish Civil War. It nevertheless was delivered to her, despite the damage, stamped with the note "Salved from GPO Dublin".

Hearn gave dedicated service to the Victoria, serving on the board from 1938 and actively involved in the running of the hospital. Hearn showed great ability to attract donations to the hospital organising fund-raising events, both for the hospital and for her community. This made her famous among her colleagues. Her most popular annual fund-raiser was the tea and entertainment for outpatients at Christmas.

She also held appointments as the medical officer to the Rochelle School, Cork, and Midleton College, as well as that of honorary visiting physician to Lapps Charity in Cork.

Outside of her medical career, Hearn was a keen hockey player and represented Ireland from 1908 to 1912.

== Family ==
Hearn's husband was Robert Thomas Hearn, the Church of Ireland bishop of Cork, Cloyne, and Ross. They married in September 1911. He died in 1952. She had two children with him. Her son, Robert, who went to her graduation, also became a doctor and worked as a GP in Rugby, England. Her daughter, Ellice, studied law and became a barrister in London. who was made CBE for her work as a parliamentary draughtsman.

== Death ==
She lived on St Patrick's Hill in the centre of Cork and died 3 June 1969 after a brief illness, at the Victoria Hospital. The memorial fund in her honour was used to create a nurses' library. The RCPI's study and research room in Kildare Street is named the Hearn Room in her memory.
