= Brailes =

Civil parish in Warwickshire, England

Coordinates: 52.051°N 1.544°W

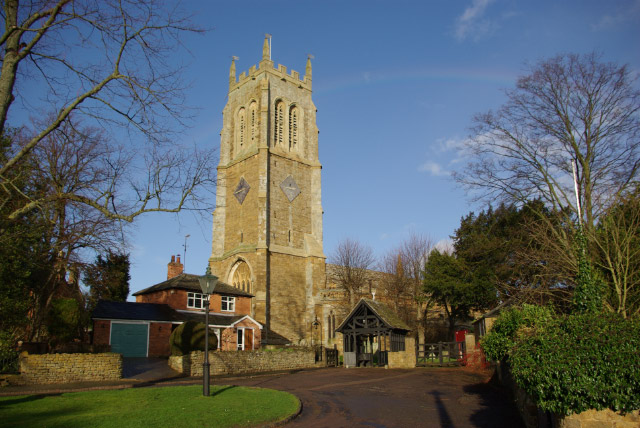
- St. George's parish church

- Location within Warwickshire
- Population: 1,149 (2011 Census)
- OS grid reference: SP3139
- District: Stratford-on-Avon
- Shire county: Warwickshire
- Region: West Midlands
- Country: England
- Sovereign state: United Kingdom
- Post town: Banbury
- Postcode district: OX15
- Dialling code: 01608
- Police: Warwickshire
- Fire: Warwickshire
- Ambulance: West Midlands
- UK Parliament: Stratford-upon-Avon
- Website: Brailes Village

Brailes is a civil parish about 3 miles (5 km) east of Shipston-on-Stour in Warwickshire, England. It includes the two villages of Lower and Upper Brailes which are located in the north Cotswolds, but it is often referred to as one village as the two villages adjoin each other. The parish includes the village of Winderton about 1.5 miles (2.4 km) northeast of Brailes, and the deserted medieval village of Chelmscote about 3.5 miles (5.6 km) north of Brailes. The parish is bounded to the east by Ditchedge Lane and Beggars' Lane, which are a historic ridgeway that also forms part of the county boundary with Oxfordshire. The northeastern boundary is a minor road, part of which follows the course of a Roman road.

The River Stour forms part of the southern boundary, and another part is formed by Sutton Brook, a tributary of the Stour. To the west, north and the remainder of the south the parish is bounded by field boundaries. Brailes is surrounded by hills. Upper Brailes is on the side of Brailes Hill, which at 761 feet (232 m) high is the fourth-highest point in Warwickshire. The east side of the village is bordered by Mine Hill, which is over 620 feet (190 m) high and is topped by a television mast, and Holloway Hill, up which the B4035 road runs towards Banbury. Between Holloway Hill and the Oxfordshire Boundary, the B4035 passes near the top of Gallow Hill, which is 679 feet (207 m) high.

== History ==
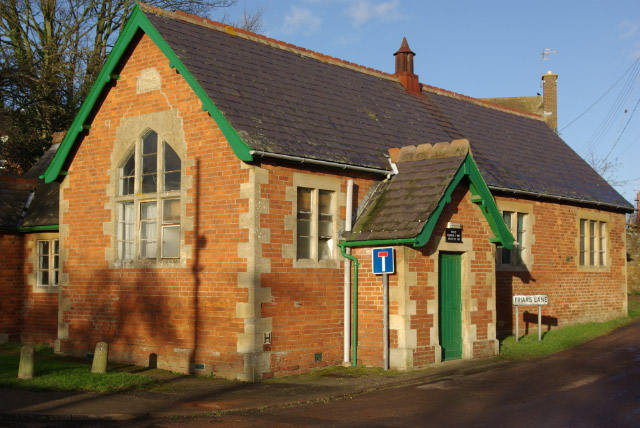
Brailes Mechanical and Craft Society in Lower Brailes

The name "Brailes" is thought to originate either from the Old Welsh breg-lis - "hill court" - or the Old English byrgels - "burial place". Castle Hill Motte in the middle of the village is a natural knoll that was made higher in the Norman era to form the motte of a motte-and-bailey castle. Its construction may have been ordered by Roger de Beaumont, who was Earl of Warwick from 1123–53. Earthworks of both the motte and the bailey survive, and the site is a Scheduled Monument.

Brailes was the home of William de Brailes, a 13th-century medieval painter of illuminated manuscripts. Of the many artists who painted such manuscripts, William is one of only two whose name has been recorded. It was also the birthplace of Thomas de Brayles (died c.1340), a senior judge and Crown official of the early fourteenth century, whose highest office was Chancellor of the Irish Exchequer. On the other side of Stocks Hill is Brailes House, the former home to the Sheldon family. The Sheldons have held the manor of Brailes since 1547. The Barbadian Methodist minister Francis George Godson was also born in the village.

== Church, chapels and meeting house ==
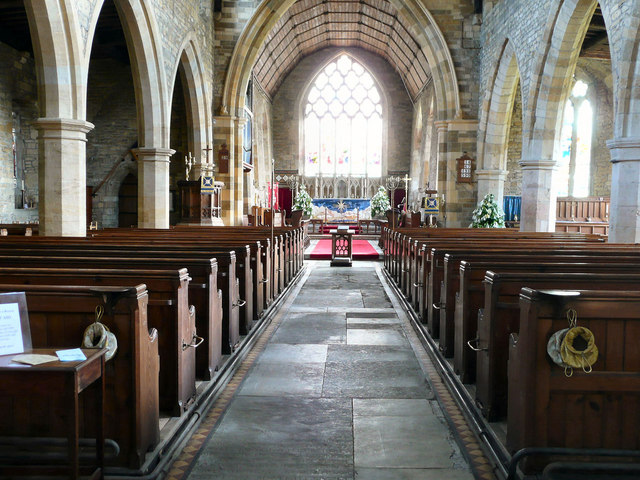
The nave of St. George's, looking east towards the chancel.

The Church of England parish church of Saint George is the largest in the Kington Hundred and is locally called the "Cathedral of the Feldon". Feldon is an Old English word meaning "the land from which the timber has been cleared away". Excavations in 1879 beneath the arcade between the nave and south aisle are said to have found 12th century foundations. The south aisle was added in about 1280 and is the oldest part of the present church building. The western part of the south arcade was added in about 1330–40 when the nave seems to have been extended westwards to its present length of six bays. At the same time the clerestory was added to the nave and the chancel was rebuilt with its present Decorated Gothic east window. The north aisle may also be 14th century, but rebuildings and alterations in 1649 and 1879 have obscured the evidence for its original appearance. In the 15th century an additional window was inserted in the south wall of the chancel. St George's is a Grade I listed building.

The bell tower is 120 feet (37 m) high and has the third-heaviest ring of six bells in England. William Chamberlain of Aldgate, London cast the second bell in about 1440. Richard I Purdue (or Purdy), who cast bells at Glastonbury, Stoford and elsewhere, cast the treble bell in 1624. Richard Keene, who had foundries at Woodstock, Oxfordshire and Royston, Hertfordshire, re-cast the fifth bell in 1671. The tenor bell was originally cast by John Bird of London, whose work spans the years 1408–18, but later it cracked. In 1877 William Blews and Sons of Birmingham re-cast the broken tenor bell and also cast the third bell.

The fourth bell has been re-cast twice: firstly by Richard Keene in 1668 and secondly by Mears and Stainbank of the Whitechapel Bell Foundry in 1900. The sanctus bell was cast about 1700 and is hung in a bellcote on the chancel arch gable. In 1877 after Blews cast the third bell and re-cast the tenor, Hooper and Stokes of Woodbury, Devon rehung the bells. This work was not entirely satisfactory so in 1894 Frederick White of Appleton rehung them again. In 1957 John Taylor & Co re-hung the bells again, this time in a two-tier frame lower in the tower. This frame was strengthened in 1993.

From 1764 until 1777 John Gilkes of Shipston-on-Stour maintained the tower's turret clock. In 1840 John Paine of Hook Norton supplied a new clock for £11 10s 0d. From 1584 until at least 1712 the advowson of St. George's parish belonged to the Bishop family, although most of the family were recusants. The manor house was built early in the 17th century In 1726 a member of the Bishop family added the range that includes the Roman Catholic chapel of St. Peter and St. Paul on the upper floor. The manor house and its chapel are a Grade II* listed building. A Quaker Meeting House, said to have been founded in the 17th century, was in existence in 1850. Brailes had two Methodist chapels. The one in Upper Brailes was built in 1863.

== Amenities ==
Brailes has one pub: the 16th-century George Hotel. In Lower Brailes there are three old school buildings, the Free School, the Old School and a third building next to the churchyard, which also served as a practice room for the village brass band in the 1950s. The old school has now been converted to a home, having been superseded in 1960 by the current Brailes Primary School building, which now has about 100 pupils. The Free School houses the mechanical and craft society. The building next to the church is used by the community. Just south of Lower Brailes is Brailes Golf Club, which has an 18-hole course. About 2 miles (3 km) southeast of Lower Brailes is Traitor's Ford, a location for family picnics and children playing.

== Events ==
Castle Hill, Mine Hill and Brailes Hill are covered in the annual Brailes Three Hills Walk, held on the first Monday in May each year. Money raised by the walk helps to fund the school and the pavilion. On the Saturday after Guy Fawkes Night, a large bonfire with fireworks is held in the playing fields, accompanied by a barbecue and a hog roast. The Brailes Village Show is held usually the second Saturday in August. At this agricultural show there are various equestrian events and a dog show. A marquee with flowers and produce on show, various stalls, a barbecue, historic cars and motorcycles, tractors and steam engines, as well as the main ring in which competitions such as tug of war and displays such as falconry are held. On the evening of the show, the Farmers' Ball is held in the marquee, with two or three live bands playing.

== Sources ==
- Beeson, C.F.C. (1989) [1962]. Simcock, A.V (ed.). Clockmaking in Oxfordshire 1400–1850 (3rd ed.). Oxford: Museum of the History of Science. pp. 178, 180, 188. ISBN 0-903364-06-9.
- Haydon, Dr Colin. "The Mouth of Hell, Religious Discord at Brailes c.1660 – c.1800". The Historian. 68. Wiley-Blackwell for Phi Alpha Theta National Historical Honor society: 23–27. Archived from the original on 18 July 2011.
- Herbert, A. (1905). Highways and Byways in Oxford and the Cotswolds. Macmillan & Co. pp. 131–132.
- Mee, Arthur (1936). Warwickshire. The King's England. Hodder and Stoughton. pp. 65–67.
- Pevsner, Nikolaus; Wedgwood, Alexandra (1966). Warwickshire. The Buildings of England. Harmondsworth: Penguin Books. pp. 217–218.
- Salzman, L.F. (1945). A History of the County of Warwick, Volume 5: Kington Hundred. Victoria County History. pp. 17–26.
- Warwickshire Federation of Women's Institutes (1988). The Warwickshire Village Book. Countryside Books. p. 26.
- Woodward, Alfred (2005). A Pictorial History of Brailes: Lower Brailes. The Alfred Woodward Collection. Vol. 1. Vale Press. ISBN 0955138809.
