= Geraldine Cummins =

Irish spritualist medium and author (1890-1969)

- Cummins c. 1915
- Born: Geraldine Dorothy Cummins; 24 January 1890; Cork, Ireland
- Died: 24 August 1969 (aged 79)
- Occupations: Novelist, playwright/dramatist
- Known for: mediumship
- Father: Ashley Cummins
- Family: Mary Cummins (sister), Iris Cummins (sister), Jane Cummins (sister)

Geraldine Dorothy Cummins (24 January 1890 –24 August 1969) was an Irish spiritualist medium, novelist and playwright. She began her career as a creative writer, but increasingly concentrated on mediumship and "channelled" writings, mostly about the lives of Jesus and Saint Paul, though she also published on a range of other topics.

Her novels and plays typically documented Irish life in a naturalist manner, often exploring the pathos of everyday life.

== Early life and creative literature ==
She was born in Cork, Ireland, the daughter of the physician Ashley Cummins, professor of medicine at the National University of Ireland and sister to Mary Hearn and Iris Cummins. In her youth she was an athlete, becoming a member of the Irish Women's International Hockey Team. She was also active as a suffragette. Her desire to follow her father in a medical career was vetoed by her mother, so she began a literary career as a journalist and creative writer. From 1913 to 1917 she wrote three plays for the Abbey Theatre in collaboration with Suzanne R. Day, the most successful of which was the comedy Fox and Geese (1917). She published the novel The Land they Loved in 1919, a naturalistic study of working class Irish life.

As she concentrated on mediumship, her literary work tailed off. However, she continued to publish creative literature in her later years. Her solo-written play, Till Yesterday Comes Again was produced by the Chanticleer Theatre, London, in 1938. She also published another novel, Fires of Beltane (1936) and a short-story collection Variety Show (1959).

Literary critic Alexander G. Gonzalez says that her work tries to encompass the full range of Irish social life, from the aristocracy to the lower classes. In this respect she was influenced by Somerville and Ross. Gonzalez considers her short story "The Tragedy of Eight Pence" to be the "finest" of her writings, the tale of a "happily married woman trying to shield her ill husband from the knowledge that his death will leave her penniless."

== Psychic writings ==
She began to work as a medium following prompting from Hester Dowden and E. B. Gibbes. She received alleged messages from her spirit-guide "Astor" and was an exponent of automatic writing. Her books were based on these communications. In 1928 she published The Scripts of Cleophas, which provided channelled material on early Christian history complementing Acts of the Apostles and St. Paul's writings, supposed to have been communicated by the spirit of Cleophas, one of Paul's followers. This was later supplemented by Paul in Athens (1930) and The Great Days of Ephesus (1933).

Cummins' next work described human progress through spiritual enlightenment. The Road to Immortality (1932) provided a glowing vision of the afterlife. Its contents were purportedly communicated from the 'other side' by the psychologist and psychic researcher Frederic W. H. Myers. Unseen Adventures (1951) was a spiritual autobiography. She also published several books of spiritually-derived knowledge about details of the life of Jesus.

During World War II she allegedly worked as a British agent, using her personal contacts to identify pro-Nazi factions within the Irish Republican movement. She also employed her psychic activities to support the allied cause, sending channelled messages from sympathetic spirits to Allied leaders to support the war effort. This included information from Theodore Roosevelt, Arthur Balfour and Sara Roosevelt, Franklin D. Roosevelt's mother.

In the 1940s and 50s she worked with psychiatrists to develop a model for using spiritualism to treat mental illness, ideas she explored in Perceptive Healing (1945) and Healing the Mind (1957). She collaborated with a psychiatrist who used the pseudonym R. Connell on both books. Their method was for Cummins to "read" an object associated with the patient and thus identify either childhood traumas or experiences of ancestors (preserved as "race memory") which have created the problem. This included treating a patient who was concerned about his homosexual desires by discovering that this derived from the fact that his Huguenot ancestors were humiliated by Catholics in the 18th century.

Her biography of writer and spiritualist Edith Somerville was published in 1952. She also wrote The Fate of Colonel Fawcett (1955) which offered her psychic insights into the disappearance of the explorer Percy Fawcett in Brazil in 1925. Cummins claimed she had received psychic messages from Fawcett in 1936. He was still alive at that time, informing her that he had found relics of Atlantis in the jungle, but was ill. In 1948 she had a message from Fawcett's spirit reporting his death. Her last book was an account of her conversations with the spirit of Mrs Willett (the spiritualist name of Winifred Coombe Tennant): Swan on a Black Sea; a Study in Automatic Writing; the Cummins-Willett Scripts (1965).

== Reception ==
The automatic writing and alleged channeled material from Cummins have been examined and have been described by some psychical researchers to be the product of her own subconscious. For example, Harry Price who studied various mental mediums including Cummins wrote that "there is no question that most of the automatic writing which has been published is the product of the subconscious." Paranormal researcher Hilary Evans noted that unlike most spiritualists, Cummins did not accept the phenomena at face value and questioned the source of the material.

According to the psychical researcher Eric Dingwall information published in Cummins' scripts allegedly from Mrs Willet were discovered to be erroneous. Biographer Rodger Anderson wrote that although spiritualists considered Cummins completely honest "some suspected that she occasionally augmented her store of knowledge about deceased persons by normal means if by doing so she could bring comfort to the bereaved."

Cummins' book The Fate of Colonel Fawcett published in 1955, contains her automatist scripts allegedly from the spirit of Colonel Fawcett. Spiritualists have claimed the scripts are evidence for survival. However, the psychical researcher Simeon Edmunds noted that Fawcett before his disappearance had written articles for the Occult Review. Cummins also contributed articles to the same review and Edmunds suggested it is likely she had read the work of Fawcett. Edmunds concluded the scripts were a case of subliminal memory and unconscious dramatization.

Other researchers such as Mary Rose Barrington have suspected fraud as Cummins had long standing connections with friends and families of the deceased that she claimed to have contacted and could have easily obtained information by natural means. The classical scholar E. R. Dodds wrote that Cummins worked as a cataloguer at the National Library of Ireland and could have taken information from various books that would appear in her automatic writings about ancient history. Her writings were heavily influenced by literature and religious texts. Dodds also studied her book Swan on a Black Sea which was supposed to be an account of spirit conversation but wrote there was evidence suggestive of fraud as Cummins had received some of the information by natural means.

== Works ==
=== Plays ===
- Broken Faith (co-written with Suzanne Day; Abbey Theatre, 1913)
- The Way of the World (co-written with Suzanne Day; Abbey Theatre, 1914)
- Fox and Geese (co-written with Suzanne Day; Abbey Theatre, 1917)
- Till Yesterday Comes (Chanticleer Theatre, London, 1938)

=== Fiction ===
- The Land they Loved, 1918
- The Fires of Beltane, 1936
- Variety Show, 1959

=== Non-Fiction ===
- Dr. E. Œ Somerville: A Biography, 1952

=== Psychic works ===
- The Scripts of Cleophas, 1928
- Paul in Athens, 1930
- The Great Days of Ephesus, 1933
- The Road to Immortality, 1933
- Beyond Human Personality, 1935
- The Childhood of Jesus, 1937
- After Pentecost, 1944
- Perceptive Healing, 1945 (with R. Connell)
- They Survive, 1946
- The Resurrection of Christ, 1947
- Travellers in Eternity, 1948
- The Manhood of Jesus, 1949
- I Appeal Unto Caesar, 1950
- The Fate of Colonel Fawcett, 1955
- Mind in Life and Death, 1956
- Healing the Mind, 1957 (with R. Connell)
- Swan on a Black Sea, 1965

== See also ==
- Cummins v Bond
