= Sterling Berry =

Irish bishop (1854–1931)

Thomas Sterling Berry (10 January 1854 – 25 February 1931) was the 9th Bishop of Killaloe, Kilfenora, Clonfert and Kilmacduagh.

Born in Portarlington, County Laois, in 1854, the son of Rev. William Winslow Sterling and Jane Langley, he attended Portarlington School, his father ministered in St. Paul's (French Church). Educated at Trinity College, Dublin (BA 1875, BD 1878, MA 1882, DD 1884) A noted scholar he won Archbishop King's and Bishop Forster's Prizes in 1875, Elrington, Warren, and the Downes Prizes in 1876, also the Divinity Test and Theology Exhibition in 1876.

He was ordained in 1877, and his first posts were curacies at Christ Church, Kingstown(1877–1879) and St. George's Church, Dublin(1879–1884;). Later he held incumbencies at Birr(1884–1892) serving also as prebend/Canon Tulloh(1890–1892) and St. Philip and St. James Church, Booterstown(1892–1913) before his ordination to the episcopate in 1913.
He died in post when in Queenstown(Cobh), Co. Cork in 1931.

Berry authored Christianity and Buddhism: A Comparison and a Contrast. The book rejected the idea of Buddhist influences on Christianity.

His eldest son Dr. Winslow Seymour Sterling Berry B.A. M.B. B.Ch., B.A.O., served as Captain in the Royal Army Medical Corp serving with the 9th Royal Irish Fusiliers, during the Great War, later in life he served as the Irish Governments Deputy Chief Medical Advisor, and later registrar of the Westmoreland Lock Hospital.

== Selected publications ==
- Christianity and Buddhism: A Comparison and a Contrast (1890)

Church of Ireland titles
Preceded by Charles Benjamin Dowse	Bishop of Killaloe, Kilfenora, Clonfert and Kilmacduagh; 1913–1924	Succeeded by Henry Edmund Patton
