= Suzanne R. Day =

Irish suffragist and writer (1876-1964)

- From the cast of 1901 production of The Mikado, Cork
- Born: Suzanne Rouviere Day; 24 April 1876; Cork, Ireland
- Died: 26 May 1964 (aged 88); London
- Occupation: Writer
- Father: Robert Day

Suzanne Rouviere Day (24 April 1876 – 26 May 1964) was an Irish feminist, novelist and playwright. She founded the Munster Women's Franchise League, was one of Cork's first women poor-law guardians and served a support role in both World Wars.

== Biography ==
Day was born in Cork, Ireland, on 24 April 1876 to Robert and Rebecca Day. Her father Robert ran a Saddler and Ironmonger business and was a well known antiquarian and photographer.

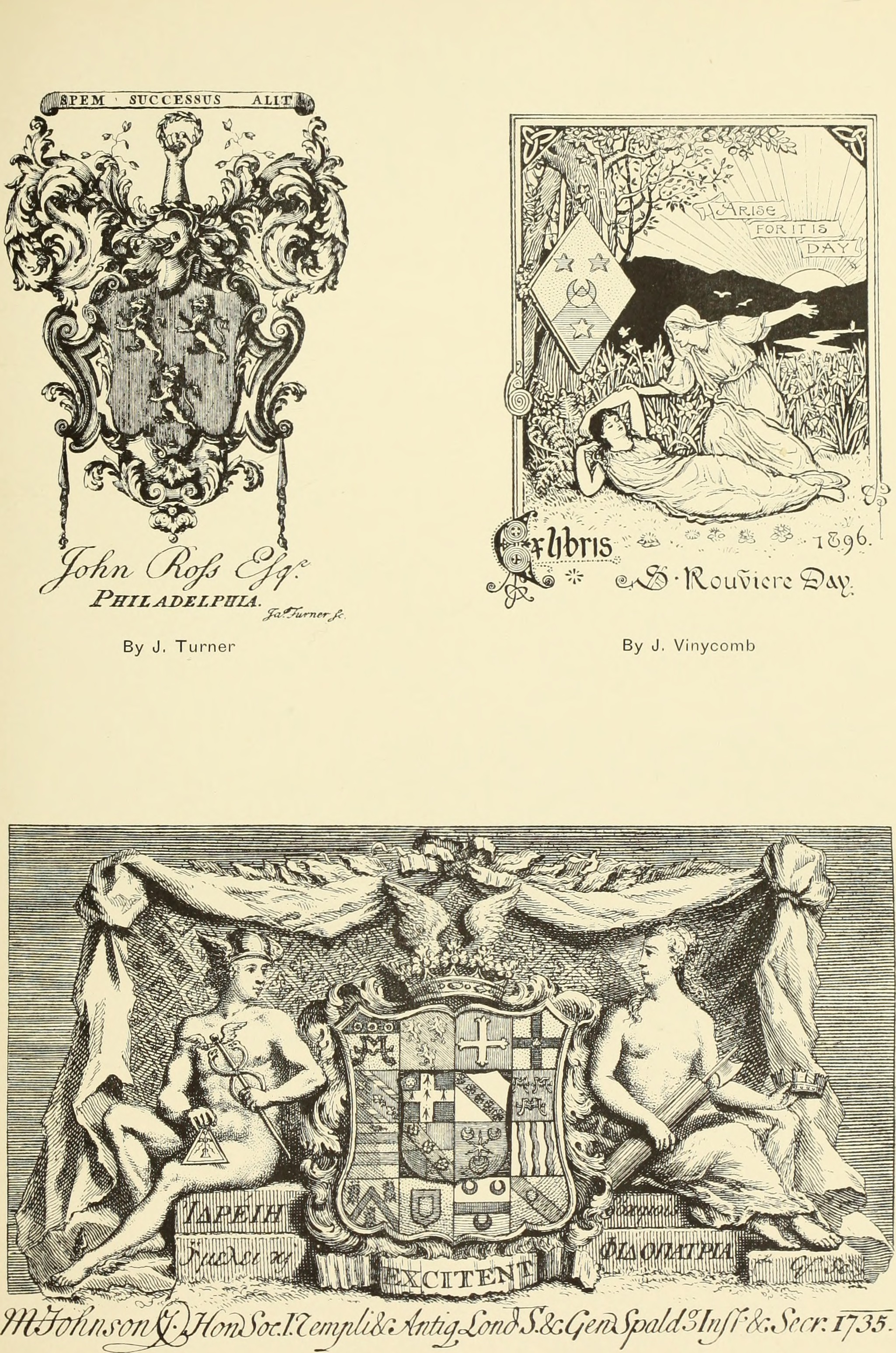
1896: Bookplate for Suzanne R. Day, designed by John Vinycomb

In 1910, she formed the local Irish Women's Franchise League branch in Cork as an activist group for women's suffrage. The following year she left that group and founded the non-militant Munster Women's Franchise League. Her new interest in politics led to her winning the election of poor-law guardians the same year. Her later writings reveal that she saw the Cork workhouses as an expensive self-perpetuating evil run by amateurs. This led to her first novel. From 1913 to 1917, she wrote three plays for the Abbey Theatre in collaboration with Geraldine Cummins, the most successful of which was the comedy Fox and Geese (1917).

The Battle of Verdun lasted most of 1916 and during that time Day was among a group from the Society of Friends who cared for the wounded. She was in France for fifteen months and she used the experience to create her 1918 book Round about Bar-le-Duc. Where the Mistral Blows was published in 1933 and describes her time in Provence in France.

She worked as a member of the fire service in London during the Second World War. She lived in Cork, France and London. She was living at 47 Argyle Road, Kensington, London, when she died, but she died in Cromer and District Hospital on 26 May 1964.

== Criticism ==
The work of Suzanne Rouviere Day and Geraldine Cummins has been described as a mixture of paganism and melodrama and has been suggested as a precursor to John B. Keane.

== Works ==
=== Plays ===
- Out of a Deep Shadow (1912)
- Toilers (1913)
- Broken Faith (co-written with Geraldine Cummins; Abbey Theatre, 1913)
- The Way of the World (co-written with Geraldine Cummins; Abbey Theatre, 1914)
- Fox and Geese (co-written with Geraldine Cummins; Abbey Theatre, 1917)
- Sixes and Sevens (1918)

=== Books ===
- The Amazing Philanthropists (1916)
- Round about Bar-le-Duc (1918)
- Where the Mistral blows (1933)
- St Martin's Cloak, unpublished draft novel
