= Paul Colton =

Irish bishop

The Right Reverend Paul Colton
- Bishop of Cork, Cloyne and Ross
- Church: Church of Ireland
- Diocese: Diocese of Cork, Cloyne and Ross
- In office: 1999–2026
- Predecessor: Robert Warke
- Successor: Andrew Orr

Orders
- Ordination: 1984
- Consecration: 25 March 1999

Personal details
- Born: William Paul Colton; 13 March 1960 (age 66) Cork, Ireland
- Denomination: Anglicanism
- Education: Trinity College, Dublin; Cardiff University

William Paul Colton (born 13 March 1960) is a retired Irish Anglican bishop. From 1999 to 2026, he served as Bishop of Cork, Cloyne and Ross in the Church of Ireland.

== Biography ==
Paul Colton attended St Luke's National School, Douglas, Cork, Cork Grammar School and Ashton Comprehensive School, Cork, before being awarded a scholarship to the Lester B. Pearson United World College of the Pacific, Victoria, British Columbia, Canada, where he completed the International Baccalaureate in 1978. He studied law at University College Cork (part of the National University of Ireland) and was the first graduate of the university to be elected to a bishopric in the Church of Ireland. He studied theology at Trinity College Dublin. In 1987, he obtained an MPhil degree in ecumenics from Trinity College Dublin, and in 2006, an LLM degree from Cardiff University. His law thesis was on the subject of legal definitions of church membership. In 2013, he received a PhD degree in law also from Cardiff University. His academic areas of interest are church law, the law of the Church of Ireland, law within Anglicanism, the interface between the laws of religious communities and the laws of States (particularly in Ireland and Europe), human rights, education law, and charity law. In 2014, he was appointed as an honorary research fellow at Cardiff Law School of Cardiff University, and its Centre for Law and Religion.

He was consecrated bishop at Christ Church Cathedral, Dublin, on 25 March 1999—the Feast of the Annunciation. He was enthroned in St. Fin Barre's Cathedral, Cork on 24 April 1999, in St Colman's Cathedral, Cloyne on 13 May 1999, and in St. Fachtna's Cathedral, Ross on 28 May 1999.

He officiated at the wedding of footballer David Beckham and Spice Girl Victoria Adams on 4 July 1999 at the medieval Luttrellstown Castle on the outskirts of Dublin.

He is married to Susan Colton, who was deputy principal of a primary school until her retirement in 2022, and they have two adult sons.

He was the first Church of Ireland bishop to openly support same-sex marriage.

In 2017, Bishop Paul Colton was presented with the Spirit of Cork Award in recognition of his "outstanding leadership of people", "the affection that the people have for him as a person and Church leader", "his inclusiveness for all in our society", and "his ability to speak out and be heard in Civic, Church and State matters".

He has been involved in education debates and in charity work. For 26 years he chaired the board of directors of Saint Luke's Charity, Cork which focuses on care for older people and those living with dementia. As of 2026, he is president of the charity. During his time as bishop, he chaired the board of governors of Midleton College and was chairperson of the board of Ashton School in Cork and a director of Bandon Grammar School.

At the episcopal ordination of Bishop Fintan Gavin as Catholic Bishop of Cork and Ross in June 2019, Colton presented the crozier at Bishop Gavin's request.

As of June 2020, Colton was the longest-serving bishop of Cork, Cloyne and Ross since bishop William Lyon in 1617 and also the longest serving bishop still in office in the Anglican churches of Ireland, England, Scotland and Wales. In March 2021, he was presented with a Pride of Cork Award to mark his long tenure as Bishop of Cork, and to recognise his work for inclusion and his nightly prayers on social media during the Coronavirus Pandemic.

In 2024, to mark his silver jubilee as bishop, Colton conducted his fifth full formal visitation of the diocese, replicating, as much as possible, the route taken by his predecessor Bishop Dive Downes in 1699. In May 2024, Bishop Colton was afforded a civic reception at Cork City Hall to mark the fact that he had become the longest serving Church of Ireland Bishop of Cork in more than 400 years.

In September 2025, he announced his intention to retire in April 2026. A service, to mark his retirement, was held at Saint Fin Barre's Cathedral in Cork on 18 April 2026. The preacher was the Dean of the Southwark, Mark Oakley.

== Publications ==
Colton is the author of almost a dozen book chapters, mostly in the area of the interface between religion and law.

== Ecclesiastical career ==
- Curate of Lisburn St. Paul (Connor) 1984 – 1987
- Bishop's Domestic Chaplain (Connor) 1985 – 1990
- Vicar Choral Belfast Cathedral (St. Anne) 1987 – 1990
- Minor Canon Belfast Cathedral ( St. Anne) 1989–1990
- Incumbent of Castleknock and Mulhuddart with Clonsilla (Dublin) 1990–1999
- Priest Vicar, registrar and Chapter Clerk of Christ Church Cathedral, Dublin 1990–1995
- Rural Dean of St. Mary's (Dublin) 1994–1999
- Canon of Christ Church Cathedral, Dublin 1997–1999
- Chairman Connor Youth Council 1986–1990
- Member of Interchurch Marriages Preparation Course 1991–1998
- Co-ordinator of Religious Programmes involving the Protestant Churches at Raidió Teilifís Éireann (RTÉ) 1993–1999
- Hon. Chaplain, Actors Church Union 1994~1997 Area Chaplain (Ireland) 1996–1997
- Member of Central Committee, Conference of European Churches 1992–1997
- Church of Ireland Representative at the Porvoo Conversations and Porvoo Communion Contact Group 1989–1999
- Secretary of the Church of Ireland General Synod 1999
- Research Associate at the Centre for Law and Religion, School of Law and Politics, Cardiff University, 2006
- Honorary Fellow at the Centre for Law and Religion, School of Law and Politics, Cardiff University, 2014
- Member of the General Committee of the Ecclesiastical Law Society, 2006–2012
- Honorary Research Fellow at Cardiff University Law School, 2014-2026
