= Archdeacon of Cork, Cloyne and Ross =

Ecclesiastical officer within the Anglican Diocese of Cork, Cloyne and Ross

Province of Dublin
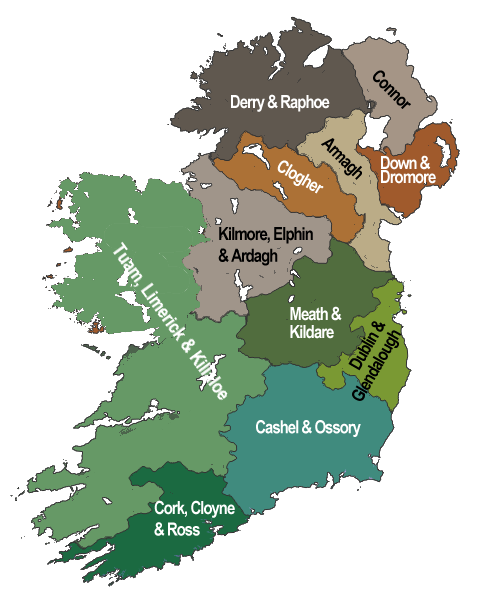
- Church: Church of Ireland
- Metropolitan bishop: Archbishop of Dublin
- Cathedral: Christ Church Cathedral, Dublin
- Dioceses: 5

The Archdeacon of Cork, Cloyne and Ross is a senior ecclesiastical officer within the Anglican Diocese of Cork, Cloyne and Ross. The Archdeacon is responsible for the disciplinary supervision of the clergy within the Diocese. The current incumbent is Adrian Wilkinson.

The archdeaconry can trace its history back to Patrick M'Carthy who held the office of Archdeacon of Cork in 1157; Colman O'Scannlain, the first Archdeacon of Cloyne, who died in 1189; and Meredith Hanmer, the first Archdeacon of Ross of whom we have a full biography,
