= Frederick Wynne =

Frederick Richards Wynne (19 June 1827 – 2 November 1896) was the 6th Bishop of Killaloe and Clonfert.

Educated at Trinity College Dublin, he was ordained in 1850. After a curacy in Carnteel he held incumbencies at St Mary, Kilkenny and St Mathias, Dublin. A Canon Residentiary at both of Dublin's cathedrals (Christ Church and St Patrick's) he was also Professor of Pastoral Theology at Trinity College Dublin. In 1893 he became the Bishop of Killaloe and Clonfert, a post he held until his sudden death. He had become a Doctor of Divinity (DD).

His son Henry Vynne also became a priest, and was Vicar of the parish church in Yapton, Sussex. A daughter married another priest, the rev. W. H. Harper; while his third daughter Florence Anne Wynne married in 1902 the architect and architectural historian Philip Mainwaring Johnston.

Church of Ireland titles
Preceded by William Chester	Bishop of Killaloe and Clonfert; 1893–1896	Succeeded by Mervyn Archdall
