= Eddie Burks =

Albert Edward "Eddie" Burks (16 December 1922 – 23 August 2005) was a civil engineer and self-proclaimed ghosthunter. He was best known for being featured in the British paranormal television documentary series Ghosthunters in an episode entitled The Man Who Talks To Ghosts.

Burks made news headlines in 1993 when it was revealed that the Queen's bank Coutts contacted him to deal with an alleged ghost at its prestigious Strand headquarters in Central London; his intervention is said to have laid to rest the troubled soul of Thomas Howard, 4th Duke of Norfolk, who was executed for treason in 1572. The Italian investigator and skeptic Massimo Polidoro accompanied Burks in 1993 to a villa in Breganzona to attempt to contact and free a spirit allegedly trapped there. While Burks appeared to believe that he had succeeded with the spirit of a young woman who had died tragically in the house, there was no historical evidence that such an occurrence had taken place there.

Soon afterwards Burks teamed up with freelance writer Gillian Cribbs to visit haunted places throughout England and act as a psychic therapist to troubled spirits. Burks claimed to have contacted spirits in places as diverse as palaces, manor houses, pubs and council flats, while Cribbs conducted interviews with witnesses and checked historical details. Gillian Cribbs later went on to write the book Ghosthunter: Investigating the World of Ghosts and Spirits in collaboration with Burks.

== Bibliography ==
- Ghosthunter: Investigating the World of Ghosts and Spirits, Eddie Burks and Gillian Cribbs (1995)
