= Iris Cummins =

Irish civil engineer, (1894-1968)

- Born: Iris Ashley Cummins; 6 June 1894; Cork, Ireland
- Died: 30 April 1968 (aged 73); Dublin, Ireland
- Education: University College Cork
- Occupation: Engineer
- Father: Ashley Cummins
- Family: Mary Hearn (elder sister), Geraldine Cummins (younger sister), Jane Cummins (younger sister)

Iris Ashley Cummins (6 June 1894 – 30 April 1968) was the first female engineer to graduate University College Cork (UCC) and was also an international hockey player.

== Early life and education ==
Cummins was born on 6 June 1894 in Woodville, Glanmire, County Cork to William Edward Ashley Cummins (1858–1923), professor of medicine at University College Cork, and Jane Constable Cummins (née Hall). They had five daughters and six sons. Geraldine Cummins was a playwright. Jane Cummins was a squadron officer in the WRAF during the World War II and became a medical doctor. Mary Hearn was a gynaecologist and fellow of the RCPI. Two of her brothers also became doctors; one, N. Marshall Cummins, was involved in setting up the first blood transfusion service in Cork.

== Education ==
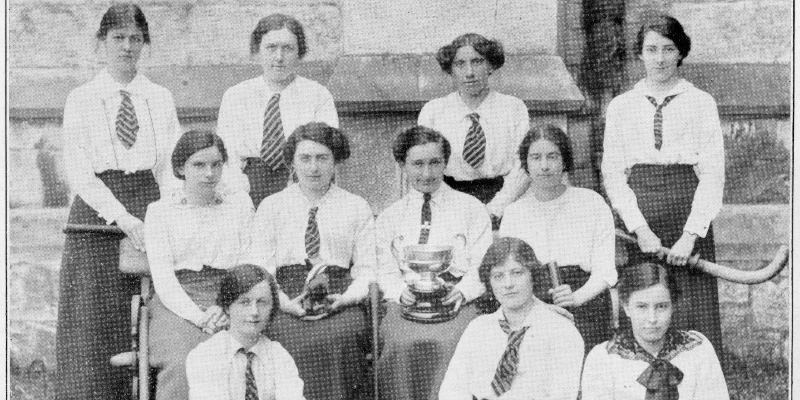
Cummins holding hockey trophy

Cummins began to study in UCC in 1912. At that time there were 78 women students out of the 420 students enrolled. She graduated with an engineering degree in 1915. During her time in engineering Cummins was editor of the Journal of the Engineering Society

While she was in college, Cummins was on the Ireland hockey team. She earned her first ‘cap’ for hockey in 1914 and lead the college hockey team to victory in the Munster cup. The Irish hockey team toured the US in 1925 with Cummins as the captain. With the team she went to the White House at the invitation of Calvin Coolidge.

== Work ==
Cummins worked for the Royal Arsenal with the munitions factory at Woolwich, London and then the Vickers factory at nearby Erith as well as in a shipyard in Scotland during the First World War between 1915 and 1916 before returning to Cork. Initially there she found it hard to find work.

In 1924 she founded a private practice in the city and worked there until 1927 at which time she was appointed to the Irish Land Commission in Dublin. She moved to Dublin and although she visited, she never returned to live in Cork.

She retired from the Land Commission in 1954.

In 1927 Cummins became the first woman member of the Institution of Civil Engineers of Ireland.

She was a Council member of the Women's Engineering Society having joined at the organisation's inception. In December 1919, Cummins wrote an encouraging article in the very first edition of the society's The Woman Engineer journal. Based on her own Irish university experience, it laid out the practicalities of studies as well as social interactions likely to be encountered by a woman thinking of training as a civil engineer. The following year, she had another article published, this time in the Practical Engineer magazine, entitled "The Suitability of Women for the Engineering Industries"

Twenty years later, in 1940, she wrote a lively piece on Women Engineers Overseas - in Eire for The Woman Engineer journal on her experiences as one of the earliest women engineers in Ireland. In this article, she recounted a tale of encountering the "oldest Inhabitant" of a very rural area, a proud owner of two fine horses, who on discovering "you must be an engineer, so would ye mind mending the electric light in the mare's stable?"

Cummins died 30 April 1968 in Dublin.

== Memorial ==
Cummins was remembered by University College Cork when they named the Civil Engineering Building after her.
