= Mervyn Archdall (bishop) =

Mervyn Archdall.

Mervyn Archdall (16 February 1833 – 18 May 1913) was the 7th Bishop of Killaloe, Kilfenora, Clonfert and Kilmacduagh.

Educated at Trinity College, Dublin, he was Vicar of Templebready from 1863 to 1872 and then of Rector of St Lukes's Cork until 1894, also holding the position of Archdeacon of Cork from 1878. After this he was Dean of Cork until his elevation to the episcopate. in 1897. He resigned his see in 1912.

Church of Ireland titles
Preceded by Frederick Richards Wynne	Bishop of Killaloe, Kilfenora, Clonfert and Kilmacduagh; 1897–1913	Succeeded by Charles Benjamin Dowse
