= Cummins v Bond =

1927 copyright legal case in England

Cummins v Bond was a 1927 copyright legal case in England in which it was decided that if a spirit or ghost dictates a work to the living through a medium, then the medium owns the copyright, and not the spirit or a subsequent transcriber.

== The case ==
Geraldine Cummins was a professional medium who used a pen to write down a message that she claimed to have been written by a 1900-year-old spirit, Cleophas. The message was addressed to an architect, Bligh Bond, who was present in the session, and after she wrote it, Bond typed the message himself. Bond claimed copyright on the resulting text because it was addressed to him and typed by him.

After two days of court hearings, the court decided that it had no jurisdiction over the afterlife and therefore the copyright holder and sole author was Cummins because she was the one who held the pen.

== See also ==
- Sweat of the brow
