= Mary Rose Barrington =

British parapsychologist (1926–2020)

Mary rose Barrington
- Born: 31 January 1926
- Died: 20 February 2020 (aged 94)
- Occupation: Parapsychologist

Mary Rose Barrington (31 January 1926 – 20 February 2020) was a British parapsychologist, barrister and charity administrator.

She was President of the Oxford University Society for Psychical Research, and joined the Society for Psychical Research in 1957, becoming a Council member in 1962. She served on its Spontaneous Cases Committee since the beginning of the committee. In 1995 she was elected as vice-president of the Society.

Outside of her parapsychology work, she supported animal protection and voluntary euthanasia. She was once a chairperson of the British Voluntary Euthanasia Society. She appeared in the episode Ripples in Time of the British paranormal documentary television series Ghosthunters.

== Partial bibliography ==
- A World In A Grain Of Sand: The Clairvoyance Of Stefan Ossowiecki, by Ian Stevenson, Zofia Weaver, and Mary Rose Barrington, (2005). ISBN 978-0786421121
- Beyond The Boggle Threshold: Confessions Of A Macro-Addict, in Men and Women of Parapsychology, Personal Reflections, ESPRIT Volume 2, edited by Rosemarie Pilkington, (2013). ISBN 9781938398018
- Swan on a Black Sea: How Much Could Miss Cummins Have Known?. (1966). Journal of the Society for Psychical Research. Mary Rose Barrington. Volume 43. pp. 289–300.
- "Apologia for Suicide," by Mary Rose Barrington, in "Suicide, The Philosophical Issues", edited by M. Pabst Battin and David l. Mayo. New York: St. Martins Press. 1981. ISBN 978-0720605792
- Jott: Phenomena of Spatial Discontinuities by Mary Rose Barrington
- JOTT-Phenomenon: When things just disappear: A fringe scientific perspective, Wilfried Stevens, (2025). ISBN 9783819757709
