= Francis George Godson =

Francis Godson
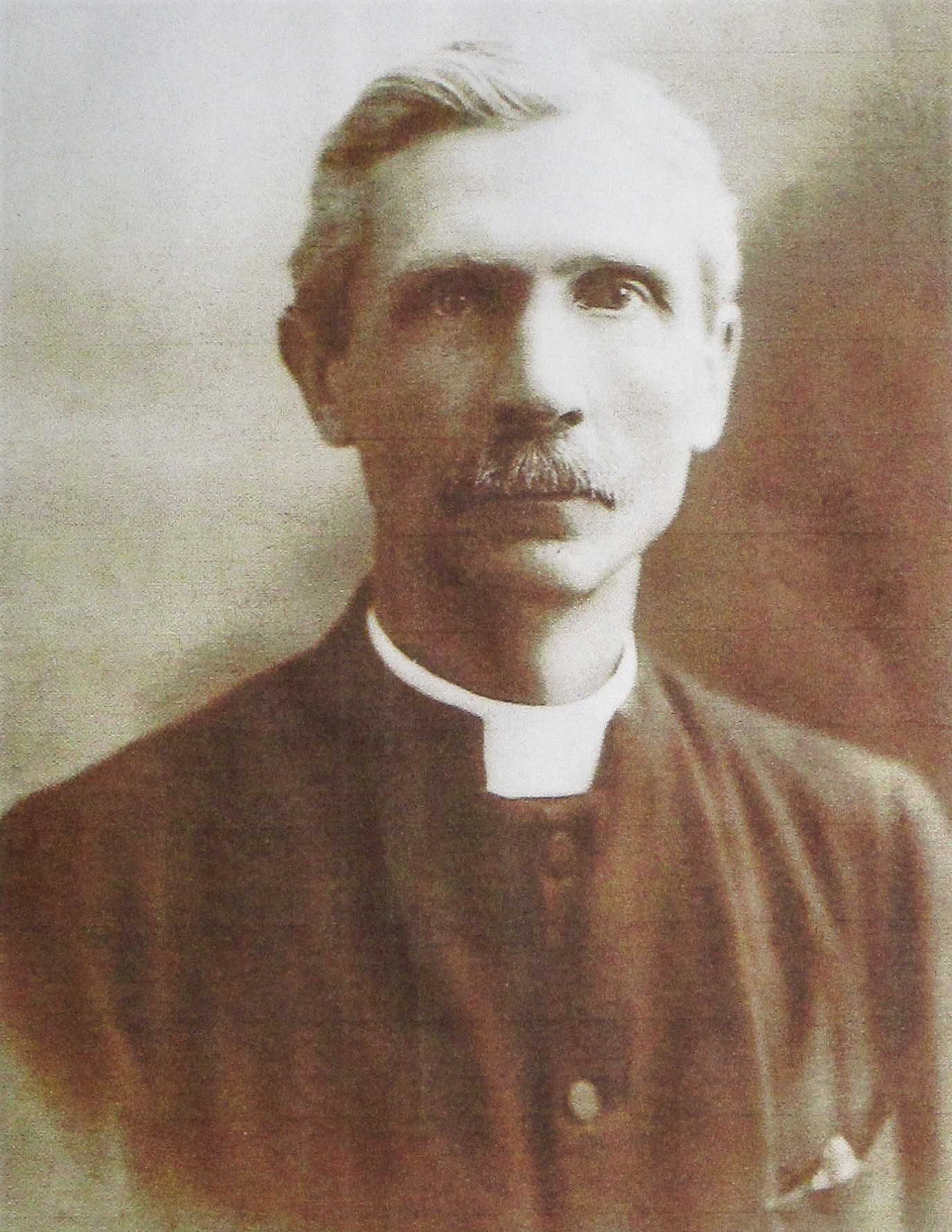

Personal details
- Born: May 1, 1864 Lower Brailes, Warwickshire, England
- Died: August 13, 1953 (aged 89) Barbados

Rev. Francis George Godson MBE was a Methodist minister from the village of Brailes in Warwickshire, and one of the early proponents of a retirement pension for the poor of Barbados.

== Family ==
Godson was the son of Stephen Godson and Mary (Morley). He grew up in the village of Lower Brailes, Warwickshire, England,

He was married, in the former British Guiana, to Florence (Hendy) (1869–1960), and they had one daughter, Annie Godson (1900–1999), and one son, also named Francis Godson (1902–1973).

At the time of his death, he was survived by his children, and also by four grandchildren, Francis Godson and George Godson (both of Barbados), Stephen Godson (Germany), and Maria Creuco (Australia).

Francis Godson is buried in the cemetery of the Bethel Methodist Church on Bay Street in Bridgetown, Barbados.

== Social activism ==
Godson left England in 1890 to spend most of the rest of his life as a Methodist minister in the Caribbean and in British Guiana.

From 1909 until his death, he was resident in Barbados, initially in the north of the island; it was there that he was witness to the poverty of many of the descendants of freed slaves and indentured servants. As early as the late 1910s, Godson had written to the Barbados Advocate newspaper, appealing for assistance for the poor. In 1936, he was a member of a legislative committee charged with “investigating the possibility of introducing in Barbados a scheme of old age pensions”. The following year Godson, as an acting-Member of the Legislative Council of Barbados, gave evidence to the Deane Commission of Enquiry, whose final report resulted in an old-age pension scheme coming into operation in Barbados on 1 May 1938.

== Honours ==
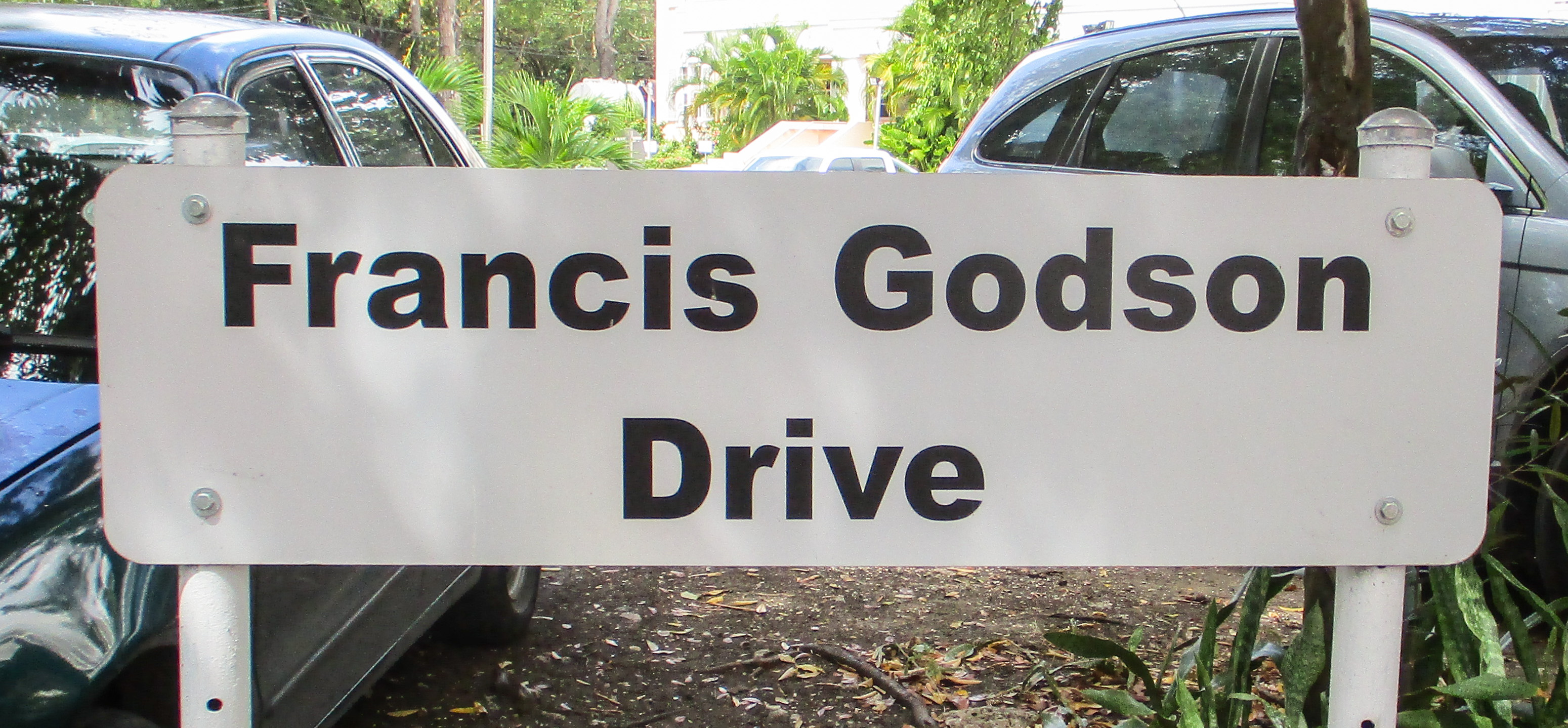
Signpost in Bridgetown, Barbados.

Francis Godson was awarded the MBE on 1 January 1949.

A road, which circles the National Insurance Office on Culloden Road in Bridgetown, is named Francis Godson Drive, in honour of Godson’s work on behalf of the poor of Barbados.
