= William Flewett =

William Edward Flewett (1861–1938) was the 8th Bishop of Cork, Cloyne and Ross.

Educated at Trinity College Dublin, he was ordained in 1885. His first post was a curacy at Lislee. He then held incumbencies at Corkbeg, Midleton, and Mallow before becoming Precentor of Cork Cathedral. From 1926 to 1933 he was Archdeacon of Cork then its Diocesan Bishop, dying in post on 5 August 1938. He is buried in the churchyard at Holy Trinity, Frankfield.

His grandson was Bishop of Limerick and Killaloe from 1985 to 2000.

== Notes ==
Church of Ireland titles
| Preceded by Charles Benjamin Dowse | Bishop of Cork, Cloyne and Ross; June 1933–December 1938 | Succeeded by Robert Thomas Hearn |
