= Thomas de Brayles =

English 14th century judge

Thomas de Brayles (died after 1339) was a senior judge and Crown official in fourteenth century England. He spent part of his career in Ireland, where he became Chancellor of the Exchequer of Ireland and a Baron of the Irish Court of Exchequer.

He was a native of Brailes in Warwickshire, where he held leasehold property.

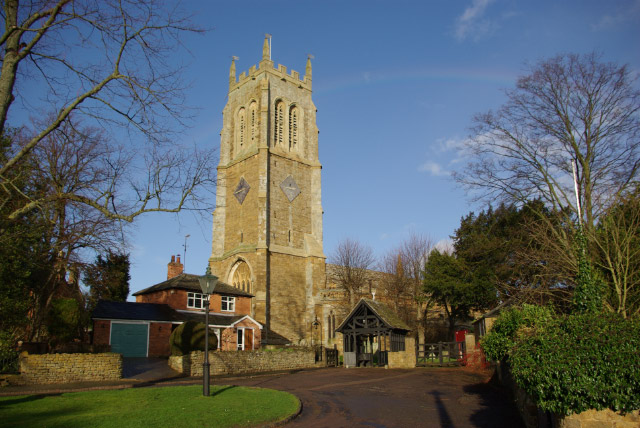
St. George's Church, Brailes

He sat on a commission of oyer and terminer in England from 1328 to 1331. He was in Ireland by 1333, when he was appointed Chancellor of the Exchequer and second Baron of the Court of Exchequer (Ireland). He had returned to England by 1339 when he was again serving on a commission of oyer and terminer in Norfolk, which among other cases heard a complaint by the Bishop of Ely about the breaking up by local merchants of the market, which the Bishop and his predecessors claimed that had held at Walpole, Norfolk since "time out of mind".

He was in holy orders, and became parish priest of Tamworth, Staffordshire and of Brightwell-cum-Sotwell, Berkshire.

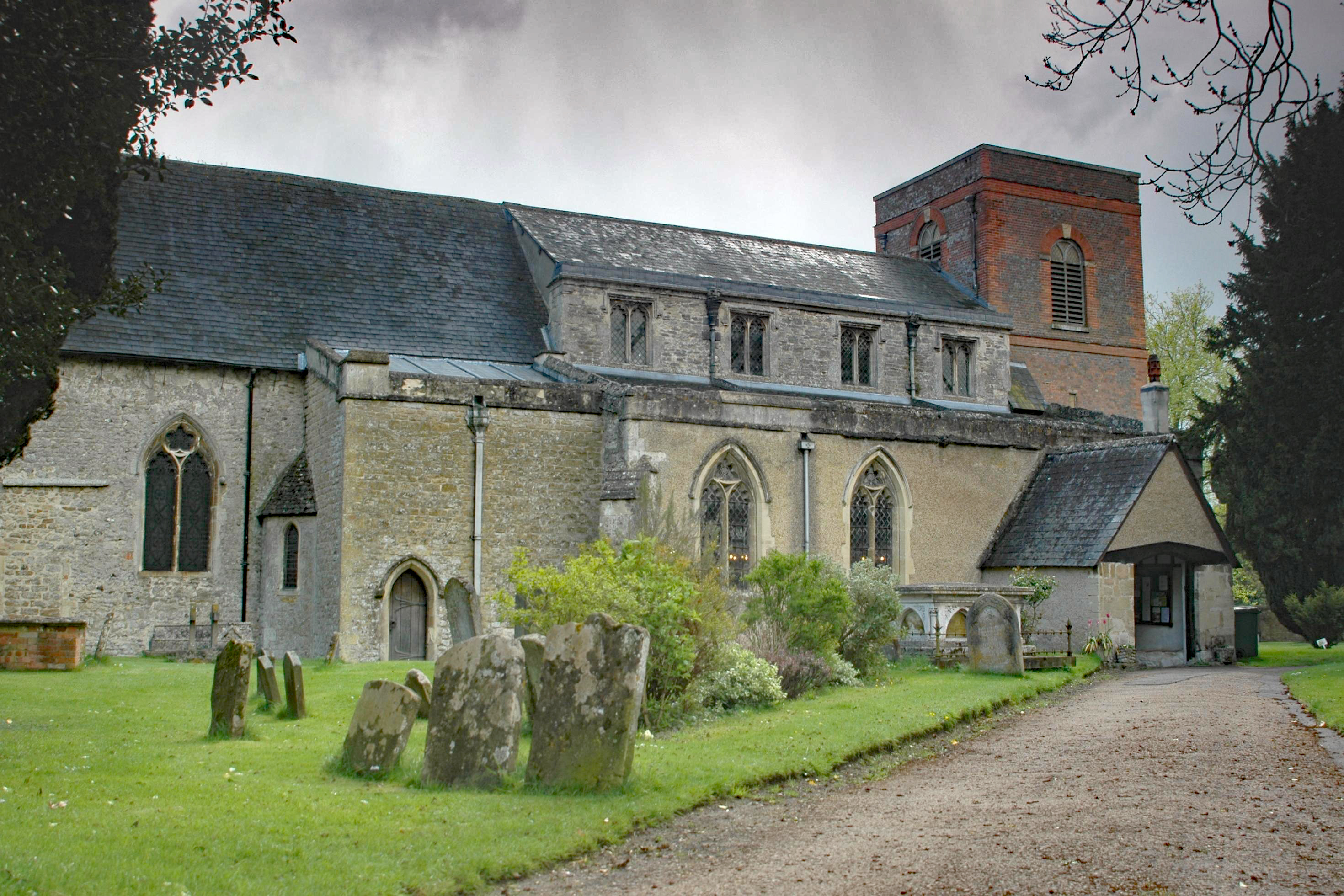
St Agatha's Church, Brightwell-cum-Sotwell. Brayles was parish priest here in the 1330s.

== Sources ==
- Ball, F. Elrington The Judges in Ireland 1221-1921 London John Murray 1926
- Calendar of the Patent Rolls of Edward III Vol.1 p. 279
- Calendar of the Patent Rolls of Edward III Vol.4 p. 362
