= Patrick M'Carthy =

Historical Irish priest

Patrick M'Carthy was an Irish priest in the late 12th century. He was the first recorded Archdeacon of Cork.
