= Bishop of Killaloe and Clonfert =

The Bishop of Killaloe and Clonfert (Full title: Bishop of Killaloe and Kilfenora with Clonfert and Kilmacduagh) was the Ordinary of the Church of Ireland diocese of Killaloe and Clonfert; comprising all of County Clare and part of counties of Tipperary, Galway and Roscommon, Ireland.

== History ==
Under the Church Temporalities (Ireland) Act 1833 (3 & 4 Will. 4. c. 37), the Episcopal see was a union of the bishoprics of Killaloe and Kilfenora and Clonfert and Kilmacduagh which were united in 1834. In 1976, Killaloe and Clonfert was united with Limerick, Ardfert and Aghadoe to form the united bishopric of Bishop of Limerick and Killaloe.

== List of Bishops of Killaloe and Clonfert ==
Bishops of Killaloe and Clonfert
| From | Until | Incumbent | Notes |
|---|---|---|---|
| 1834 | 1836 | Christopher Butson, D.D. | Appointed Bishop of Clonfert and Kilmacduagh in 1804; became Bishop of the united see of Killaloe and Clonfert on 29 January 1834; died on 23 March 1836 |
| 1836 | 1839 | Stephen Creagh Sandes, D.D. | Fellow of Trinity College, Dublin; nominated on 27 April and consecrated on 12 June 1836; translated to Cashel and Waterford in February 1839 |
| 1839 | 1861 | Hon. Ludlow Tonson, D.D. | Eighth son of William, 1st Baron Riversdale; nominated on 23 January and consecrated on 17 February 1839; on his brother's death, William, 2nd Baron Riversdale, the bishop became the 3rd Baron on 3 April 1848; died on 13 December 1861 |
| 1862 | 1883 | William FitzGerald | Translated from Cork, Cloyne and Ross; nominated on 15 January and appointed by letters patent on 3 February 1862; died at Killaloe on 24 November 1883. His son, the noted scientist George Francis FitzGerald (1851–1901), spent his formative years in Killaloe. |
| 1884 | 1893 | William Bennett Chester | Previously Dean of Killaloe; elected on 16 January and consecrated on 24 February 1884; died on 27 August 1893 |
| 1893 | 1896 | Frederick Richards Wynne | Elected on 15 November and consecrated on 10 December 1893; died on 3 November 1896 |
| 1897 | 1912 | Mervyn Archdall | Elected on 8 January and consecrated on 2 February 1897; resigned on 31 March 1912; died 18 May 1913 |
| 1912 | | Charles Benjamin Dowse | Elected on 17 May and consecrated on 11 June 1912; translated to Cork, Cloyne and Ross on 23 December 1912 |
| 1913 | 1924 | Thomas Sterling Berry | Elected on 18 February and consecrated on 25 March 1913; resigned on 6 March 1924; died on 25 February 1931 |
| 1924 | 1943 | Henry Edmund Patton | Elected on 4 April and consecrated on 1 May 1924; died on 28 April 1943 |
| 1943 | 1945 | Robert McNeil Boyd | Elected on 23 June and consecrated on 21 September 1943; translated to Derry and Raphoe on 20 March 1945 |
| 1945 | 1953 | Hedley Webster | Elected on 19 June and consecrated on 25 July 1945; resigned on 30 September 1953 |
| 1953 | 1957 | Richard Gordon Perdue | Elected on 11 November 1953 and consecrated on 2 February 1954; translated to Cork, Cloyne and Ross on 19 February 1957 |
| 1957 | 1971 | Henry Arthur Stanistreet | Elected on 5 April and consecrated on 11 June 1957; resigned on 1 November 1971 |
| 1972 | 1976 | Edwin Owen | Elected on 1 December 1971 and consecrated on 25 January 1972; became Bishop of the united Diocese of Limerick and Killaloe on 21 September 1976 |
In 1976, Killaloe & Clonfert united with Limerick, Adfert & Aghadoe to form bishopric of Limerick and Killaloe
