= Henry Stanistreet =

Bishop of Killaloe and Clonfert
- In office 1957–1971

Personal details
- Born: 19 March 1901
- Died: 4 September 1981 (aged 80)
- Spouse: Ethel Mary née Liversidge
- Education: Trent College; Trinity College, Dublin

Henry Arthur Stanistreet (19 March 1901 – 4 September 1981), was the 14th Bishop of Killaloe and Clonfert.

Stanistreet was educated at Trent College and Trinity College, Dublin and ordained in 1924. He was a curate at Clonmel and then curate in charge of Corbally before becoming the Rector of Templeharry with Borrisnafarney. From 1931 to 1943 he was Rural Dean of Ely O’Carroll then Dean of Killaloe Cathedral. He was ordained to the episcopate in 1957. He became a Doctor of Divinity (DD).

Church of Ireland titles
| Preceded by Richard Perdue | Bishop of Killaloe and Clonfert; 1957–1971 | Succeeded by Edwin Owen |
