= Ghosthunters (TV series) =

British television series

Ghosthunters is a British paranormal documentary television series that originally aired from 1996 to 1997 on the Discovery Channel. The four-series program was produced by Inca Productions of Covent Garden, London (by producers Sheldon Greenberg and Eddie Babbage), hosted by Ian Cashmore, and narrated by William Woollard. Ian Cashmore also appeared in the promo for the American Syfy series Ghost Hunters.

== Premise ==
Frequently aired on the Discovery Channel, Discovery Civilizations, and Discovery Science, the first two seasons explored contemporary research in the area of field parapsychology, largely by asking prominent researchers to explain and outline their best evidential cases, and interviewing witness while placing the cases in the context of parapsychology.

Notable researchers regularly featured on the programme include professors Archie Roy, David Fontana and Peter Fenwick.

== Episodes ==
=== Series 1 (1996) ===
All episodes were first broadcast on Sundays.

Episode	Title	Detail	First Broadcast
1.1 (1)	Legends of the Roman Legionnaires	Dr. Patrick Ottaway and Jim Lyons investigate Roman ghost sightings at the Treasurer's House York and Mersea Island, Essex.	14 April 1996
1.2 (2)	The Mysteries of the George	Examines a haunted pub in Preston, England with paranormal investigator Melanie Warren.	21 April 1996
1.3 (3)	The Phantoms of Chingle Hall	Jason Karl examines the thirteenth-century house in Lancashire which is one of Britain's most famous allegedly haunted houses.	21 April 1996
1.4 (4)	The Man Who Talk to Ghosts	An examination of mediumship, concentrating on Eddie Burks and John Parker.	28 April 1996
1.5 (5)	The Invisible Intelligence	Professor David Fontana examines the Cardiff case of Pete the Poltergeist which was active in the autumn of 1992.	5 May 1996
1.6 (6)	Holy Ghostbusters	The Rev. Tom Willis discusses exorcism and the Deliverance Ministry and the Church's work in confronting alleged supernatural happenings.	12 May 1996

=== Series 2 (1996) ===
All episodes were first broadcast on Sundays.

Episode	Title	Detail	First Broadcast
2.1 (7)	Ripples in Time	Parapsychologist Mary Rose Barrington of the Society for Psychical Research discusses the Wootton timeslip, and CJ Romer outlines the experience at Thetford Priory, Norfolk which provoked his interest in investigating hauntings.	26 May 1996
2.2 (8)	The Phantom Pilot	Parapsychologist, Professor Archie Roy investigates modern tales of post mortem apparitions and crisis apparitions.	2 June 1996
2.3 (9)	The Haunted Ballroom	John Mitchell presents a story of a haunted ballroom in York and Melanie Warren investigates the Grand Theatre in Lancaster, England.	9 June 1996
2.4 (10)	Tales from Dartmoor	John Parker investigates Jay's Grave and Graham Wyley goes to Taw Cottage on Dartmoor.	16 June 1996
2.5 (11)	The Possession	Exploring if voodoo possession really can be substantiated and investigating if strange rituals in Mississippi hold the clues to this wide-reaching and insidious form of attack. Same as episode 4.1 (21), "The Possession".	23 June 1996
2.6 (12)	Ghosthunters at Work	Looks at The Bell Inn in Thetford, Norfolk, England with ghosthunter Tony Cornell of the Society for Psychical Research. Spiritualist Trish Robertson probes the haunting of an art school.	30 June 1996

=== Series 3 (1996–1997) ===
These eight episodes were first screened between Sunday 8 December 1996 and Sunday 26 January 1997 (each episode was also repeated on the Wednesday night following the Sunday transmission).

Episode	Title	Detail	First Broadcast
3.1 (13)	Spirits of the Civil War	Many modern visitors to a battlefield have reported encounters with seventeenth century soldiers. Same as episode 4.2 (22), "The Spirits of Marston Moor".	8 December 1996
3.2 (14)	The Phantom Schoolmaster	A Victorian school burned down, and in recent years there have been reports of strange happenings a nearby photographic studio. A seance leads to the discovery of a ghostly schoolmaster long since departed. Episode includes interview with Colin Wilson. It subsequently came to light that the case for "finding" the supposed schoolmaster in the official census of 1841 was based on fraudulently altered documentation. (see Ian Cashmore)	15 December 1996
3.3 (15)	Castle Leslie	Castle Leslie is set on a lakeside in southern Ireland. Over the years there have been many unexplained incidents of ghostly activity with long-dead relatives.	22 December 1996
3.4 (16)	The Phantom Fisherman	This episode follows an extraordinary trail of clues that eventually leads to the identification of a troubled spirit of an eighteenth-century fisherman.	29 December 1996
3.5 (17)	Echoes from beyond the grave	On a lonely windswept country lane, a motorcyclist met his death. But lives on?	5 January 1997
3.6 (18)	The Priest and the Professor	A Catholic priest and a professor of psychology try to grapple with the complex problems of apparent possession by a ghostly spirit ... resulting in an exorcism.	12 January 1997
3.7 (19)	The Spirits of Bodmin Moor	The paranormal events experienced by some people who believe they have encountered King Arthur.	19 January 1997
3.8 (20)	The Case of the Gorton Poltergeist	A look behind the scenes of one of the UK's most startling poltergeist cases.	26 January 1997

=== Series 4 (1997) ===
The following eight episodes were first screened between Sunday 2 February 1997 and Sunday 23 March 1997 (each episode was also repeated on the Wednesday night following the Sunday transmission).

Episode	Title	Detail	First Broadcast
4.1 (21)	The Possession	A psychic looks into the mystery of a woman's physical possession by a ghostly spirit. Same as episode 2.5 (11), "The Possession".	2 February 1997
4.2 (22)	The Spirits of Marston Moor	An investigation into reports of sightings of soldiers long dead. Same as episode 3.1 (13), "Spirits of the Civil Warr".	9 February 1997
4.3 (23)	In the Shadow of Snowdonia	Follows exorcists as they are called in to restore normality to a haunted farmhouse in the Welsh valleys. They may appear tranquil, but frightening paranormal events can occur beneath the calm.	16 February 1997
4.4 (24)	Spectres of the Severn	The River Severn is one of Britain's greatest rivers. The high concentration of local haunted dwellings has a fascinating explanation that challenges the common theory and understanding of the strange activity. CJ Romer and Dr. Serena Roney-Dougal.	23 February 1997
4.5 (25)	The Haunting of County Wicklow	Experts investigate mysterious and ghostly encounters. Featuring a look into the tale of a drowned boy whose restless spirit haunts the area of Wicklow in Ireland, where he spent his short life.	2 March 1997
4.6 (26)	The Haunted Bypass	A new road in Yorkshire runs across land once occupied by a monastery and there are frequent reports of shadowy figures.	9 March 1997
4.7 (27)	Across the Great Divide	An investigation into the evidence of the human mind after death.	16 March 1997
4.8 (28)	Battlefield of the Somme	During the Battle of the Somme, hundreds of thousands of soldiers were killed. A disturbing atmosphere still hangs over the battlefield, which is visited in this programme by medium Peter Bowers.	23 March 1997

== See also ==
- List of ghost films
