= William FitzGerald (bishop of Killaloe and Clonfert) =

Irish Anglican bishop (1814–1883)

William FitzGerald (1814–1883) was an Anglican bishop, first of Cork, Cloyne and Ross and then of Killaloe and Clonfert.

FitzGerald was the son of Maurice FitzGerald, M.D. (d.1838), former Crown Physician at Madras, India, by his second wife, Mary (d.1821), daughter of Edward William Burton of Clifden, County Clare, and younger brother of Francis Alexander FitzGerald, third baron of the Court of Exchequer in Ireland. He was born at Lifford, Limerick on 3 Dec. 1814. He was first educated at Midleton College, County Cork, and then entering Trinity College, Dublin, in November 1830, obtained a scholarship in 1833, the primate's Hebrew prize in 1834, and the Downes's premium for composition in 1835 and 1837. He took his degree of B.A. in 1835, his M.A. in 1848, and his B.D. and D.D. in 1853.

He was ordained deacon on 25 April 1838, and priest on 23 Aug. 1847, and while serving as curate of Lackagh, Kildare, made his first essay as an author. Philip Bury Duncan of New College, Oxford, having offered a sum of £50, for an essay on Logomachy, or the Abuse of Words, FitzGerald bore off the prize with the special commendation of the donor and an additional grant of 25l. for the expense of printing the essay. After serving the curacy of Clontarf, Dublin, from 1846 to 1848 he was collated to the vicarage and prebend of Donoughmore, in the diocese of Cork, on 16 Feb. in the latter year. From 1847 to 1852 he was professor of moral philosophy in Trinity College, Dublin, and from 1852 to 1857 was professor of ecclesiastical history at the same university. His next promotion was to the vicarage of St. Anne's, Dublin, 18 July 1851, whence he removed to the perpetual curacy of Monkstown, Dublin, on 13 May 1855, being in the same year also appointed prebendary of Timothan, Dublin, and Archdeacon of Kildare.

On 8 March 1857 he was consecrated bishop of Cork, Cloyne and Ross, and in 1862 was translated to Killaloe by letters patent dated 3 Feb.

He was a voluminous author both under his own name and as an anonymous writer, and was the chief contributor to the series of papers called ‘The Cautions for the Times,’ which was edited by Archbishop Richard Whately in 1853. His edition of Bishop Butler's ‘Analogy’ displays such judgment and ‘learning without pedantry’ that it superseded all the previous editions.

He died at Clarisford House, Killaloe, on 24 Nov. 1883, and was buried at St. Nicholas Church, Cork, on 28 Nov.

He married, in 1846, Anne Frances, elder daughter of George Stoney of Oakley Park, Queen's County, and by her, who died 20 Oct. 1859, he had six children, including the noted scientist George FitzGerald (1851–1901).

== Publications ==
He was the author of the following works, some of which were the cause of controversy and published replies:

1. ‘Episcopacy, Tradition, and the Sacraments considered in reference to the Oxford Tracts,’ 1839.
2. ‘Holy Scripture the Ultimate Rule of Faith to a Christian Man,’ 1842.
3. ‘Practical Sermons,’ 1847.
4. ‘A Disputation on Holy Scripture against the Papists, by W. Whitaker,’ translated, Parker Soc., 1849.
5. ‘The Analogy of Religion, by G. Butler, with a Life of the Author,’ 1849; another ed. 1860.
6. ‘A Selection from the Nicomachean Ethics of Aristotle with Notes,’ 1850.
7. ‘The Connection of Morality with Religion,’ a sermon, 1851.
8. ‘The Irish Church Journal,’ vol. ii., ed. by W. Fitzgerald and J. G. Abeltshauser, 1854.
9. ‘National Humiliation, a step towards Amendment,’ a sermon, 1855.
10. ‘Duties of the Parochial Clergy,’ a charge, 1857.
11. ‘The Duty of Catechising the Young,’ a charge, 1858.
12. ‘A Letter to the Laity of Cork in Communion with the United Church of England and Ireland,’ 1860.
13. ‘Speech in the House of Lords on Lord Wodehouse's Bill for Legalising Marriage with a Deceased Wife's Sister,’ 1860.
14. ‘Thoughts on Present Circumstances of the Church in Ireland,’ a charge, 1860.
15. ‘The Revival of Synods in the United Church of England and Ireland,’ a charge, 1861.
16. ‘Some late Decisions of the Privy Council considered,’ a charge, 1864.
17. ‘A Charge to the Clergy of Killaloe,’ 1867.
18. ‘The Significance of Christian Baptism,’ three sermons, 1871.
19. ‘Remarks on the New Proposed Baptismal Rubric,’ 1873.
20. ‘The Order of Baptism, Speeches by Bishop of Meath and Bishop of Killaloe,’ 1873.
21. ‘Considerations upon the Proposed Change in the Form of Ordaining Priests,’ 1874.
22. ‘The Athanasian Creed, a Letter to the Dioceses of Killaloe and Kilfenora, Clonfert, and Kilmacduagh,’ 1875.
23. ‘Lectures on Ecclesiastical History, including the Origin and Progress of the English Reformation,’ ed. by W. Fitzgerald and J. Quarry, 2 vols. 1882.
