= Hedley Webster =

Hedley Webster (21 July 1880 – 28 June 1954) was the 12th Bishop of Killaloe, Kilfenora, Clonfert and Kilmacduagh.

Educated at Trinity College, Dublin and ordained in 1904, his first posts were curacies at St Luke's, Cork and Holy Trinity, Cork. He held incumbencies at Kinneigh and Blackrock before being appointed Archdeacon of Cork in 1938. He was Bishop of Killaloe, Kilfenora, Clonfert and Kilmacduagh from 1945 to 1953.

Church of Ireland titles
Preceded by Robert McNeil Boyd	Bishop of Killaloe, Kilfenora, Clonfert and Kilmacduagh; 1945–1953	Succeeded by Richard Gordon Perdue
