= Bishop of Cork, Cloyne and Ross =

Bishopric in the Church of Ireland

The Bishop of Cork, Cloyne and Ross is the Church of Ireland Ordinary of the united Diocese of Cork, Cloyne and Ross in the Province of Dublin.

As of April 2026, the position was vacant pending the election of a replacement for bishop Paul Colton who retired in April 2026 having held the role since 1999.

== Succession ==
This bishop is successor to the Bishop of Cork (from 876), Bishop of Cloyne (from 887) and Bishop of Ross (from 1160, and distinct from the Scottish Bishop of Ross). They were combined to establish the Bishop of Cork and Ross (from 1583) and the current position Bishop of Cork, Cloyne and Ross (from 1835).

== List of bishops ==
Bishops of Cork, Cloyne and Ross
From	Until	Incumbent	Notes
1583	1617	William Lyon	Appointed Bishop of Ross in 1582; he was granted in commendam the united see of Cork and Cloyne November 1583; died 4 October 1617.
1618	1620	John Boyle	Nominated 22 April 1618; letters patent 25 August 1618; died 10 July 1620.
1620	1638	Richard Boyle	Nominated 23 August 1620; consecrated November 1620; translated to Tuam 30 May 1638; father of Michael Boyle.
1638	1660	The see was divided into the bishopric of Cork and Ross and the bishopric of Cloyne. They were reunited in 1660.	
1660	1663	Michael Boyle	Nominated 6 August 1660; consecrated 27 January 1661; translated to Dublin 27 November 1663; son of Richard Boyle.
1663	1678	Edward Synge	Translated from Limerick, Ardfert and Aghadoe; nominated 24 August 1663; letters patent 21 December 1663; died 22 December 1678.
1678	1835	The see was divided again into the bishopric of Cork and Ross and the bishopric of Cloyne. Since 1835, they have remained united.	
1835	1848	Samuel Kyle	Bishop of Cork and Ross since 1831; became Bishop of Cork, Cloyne and Ross 14 September 1835; died 18 May 1848.
1848	1857	James Wilson	Nominated 24 June 1848; consecrated 30 July 1848; died 5 January 1857.
1857	1862	William FitzGerald	Nominated 27 January 1857; consecrated 8 March 1857; translated to Killaloe and Clonfert 3 February 1862.
1862	1878	John Gregg	Nominated 15 January 1862; consecrated 16 February 1862; died 26 May 1878.
1878	1893	Robert Gregg	Translated from Ossory, Ferns and Leighlin; elected 27 June 1878; confirmed 4 July 1878; translated to Armagh 14 December 1893.
1893	1912	Edward Meade	Elected 5 December 1893; consecrated 6 January 1894; died 12 October 1912.
1912	1933	Charles Dowse	Translated from Killaloe and Clonfert; elected 22 November 1912; confirmed 23 December 1912; resigned 15 September 1933; died 13 January 1934.
1933	1938	William Edward Flewett	Elected 6 October 1933; consecrated 30 November 1933; died 5 August 1938.
1938	1952	Robert Thomas Hearn	Elected 19 October 1938; consecrated 13 November 1938; died 14 July 1952.
1952	1956	George Otto Simms	Elected 2 October 1952; consecrated 28 October 1952; translated to Dublin 11 December 1956.
1957	1978	Richard Perdue	Translated from Killaloe and Clonfert; elected 31 January 1957; confirmed 19 February 1957; resigned 20 May 1978.
1978	1987	Samuel Poyntz	Elected 20 June 1978; consecrated 17 September 1978; translated to Connor.
1988	1998	Robert Warke	Elected 1988; retired 1998.
1999	2026	Paul Colton	Elected 29 January 1999; Consecrated at Christ Church Cathedral, Dublin, on Thursday 25 March 1999; Enthroned in St. Fin Barre's Cathedral, Cork on 24 April 1999, in St Colman's Cathedral, Cloyne on 13 May 1999, and in St. Fachtna's Cathedral, Ross on 28 May 1999; Retired in April 2026.
