= Robert Hearn =

Irish bishop

The Rt Rev Robert Thomas Hearn was the 9th Bishop of Cork, Cloyne and Ross.
Educated at Trinity College, Dublin, he was ordained in 1900. His first post was a curacy at Youghal after which he was Vicar of Shandon where his wife Mary Hearn was a gynaecologist. in 1926 he became Archdeacon of Cork then its Diocesan Bishop. He died in post on 14 July 1952.

== Notes ==
Church of Ireland titles
Preceded by William Edward Flewett	Bishop of Cork, Cloyne and Ross; 1938 –1952	Succeeded by George Otto Simms
