= Archdeacon of Cork =

Province of Dublin
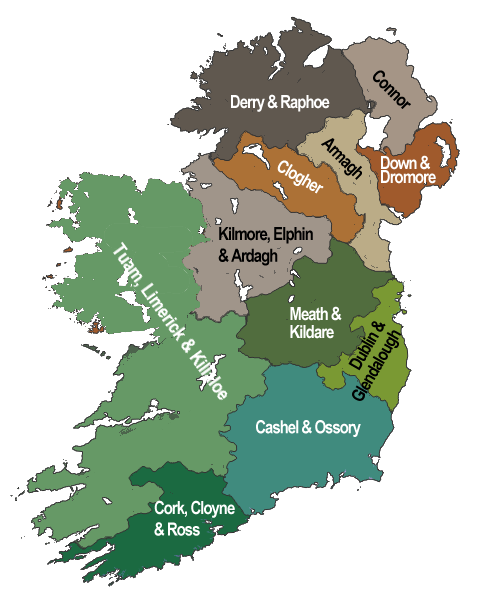
- Church: Church of Ireland
- Metropolitan bishop: Archbishop of Dublin
- Cathedral: Christ Church Cathedral, Dublin
- Dioceses: 5

The Archdeacon of Cork was a senior ecclesiastical officer within the Anglican Diocese of Cork, Cloyne and Ross. The Archdeacon was responsible for the disciplinary supervision of the clergy within the Diocese.

The archdeaconry can trace its history back to Patrick M'Carthy who held the office in 1157.

Many of them went on to higher office:

- Henry de Thrapston
- William Steere
- Michael Boyle
- John Whetham
- Mervyn Archdall
- William Edward Flewett
- Robert Thomas Hearn
- Hedley Webster
- Michael Hugh Gunton Mayes

The office has now been replaced by the post of Archdeacon of Cork, Cloyne and Ross
