= Diocese of Derry and Raphoe =

Anglican diocese of the Church of Ireland

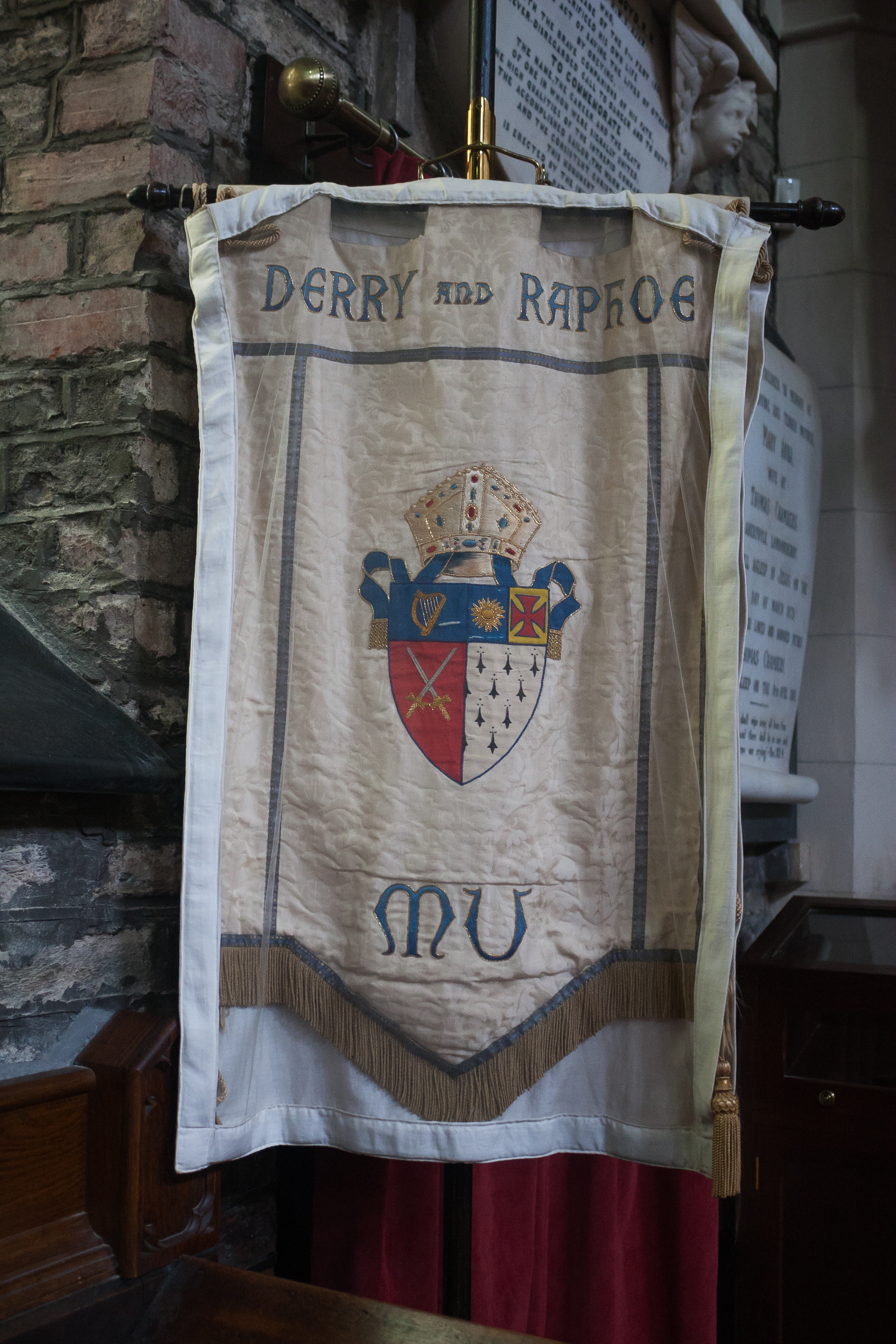
Diocesan standard in the north aisle of the St Columb's Cathedral

The Diocese of Derry and Raphoe is a diocese of the Church of Ireland in the north-west of Ireland. It is in the ecclesiastical province of Armagh. Its geographical remit straddles two civil jurisdictions: in Northern Ireland, it covers all of County Londonderry and large parts of County Tyrone while in the Republic of Ireland it covers County Donegal.

== Overview and history ==
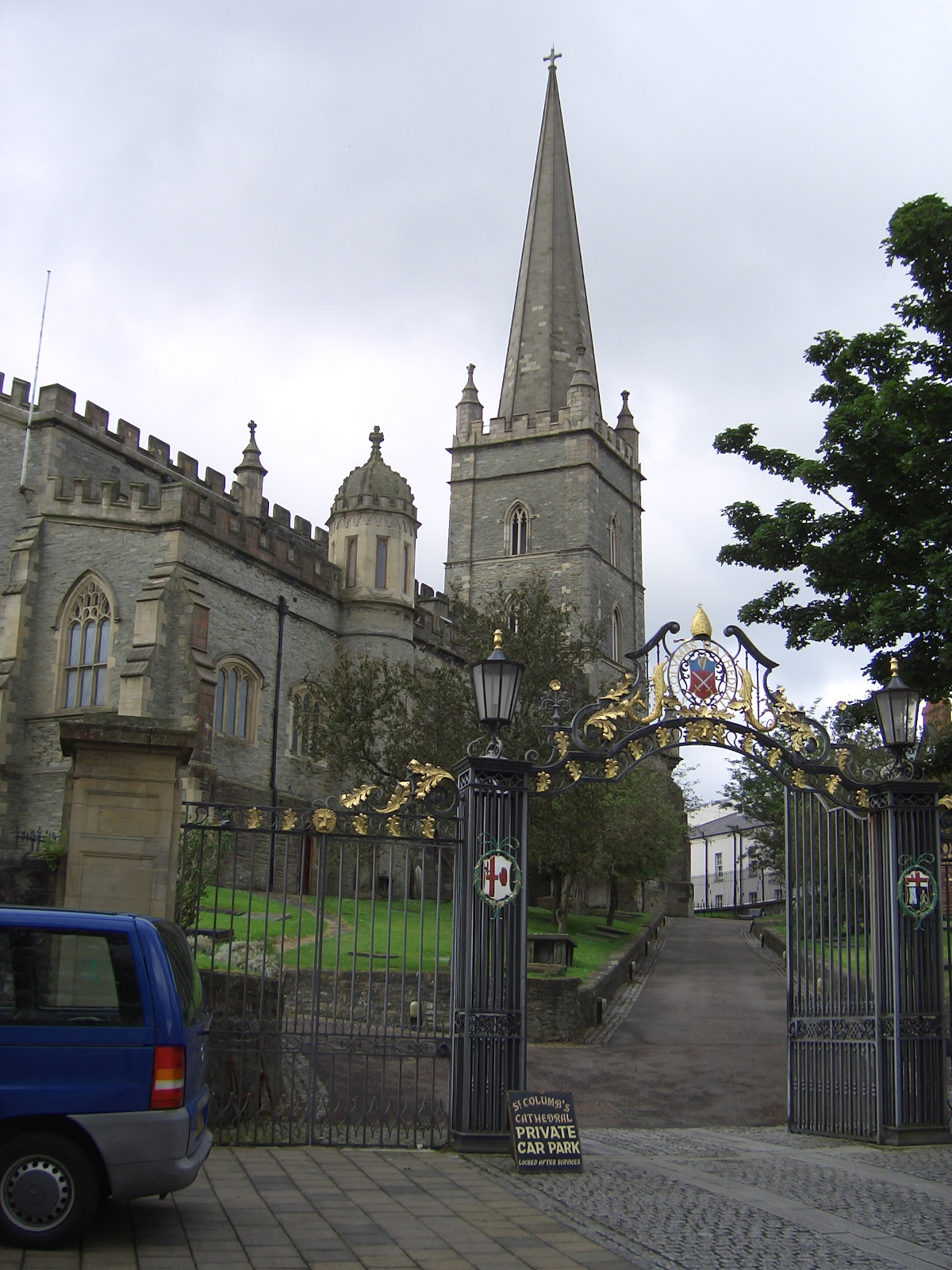
St Columb's Cathedral in Derry, the episcopal see

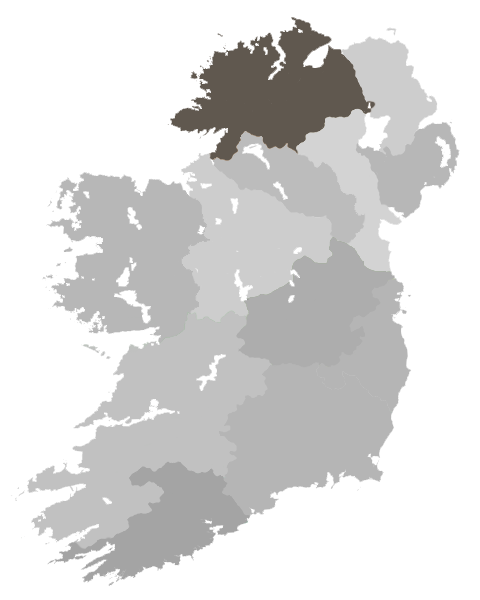
Diocese Highlighted

After the Church in England broke communion with the Catholic Church, by decree of the Irish Parliament, the Church of Ireland became the Established Church in the Kingdom of Ireland. The English-speaking minority mostly adhered to the Church of Ireland or to Presbyterianism, while the Roman Catholic Church undertook extensive mission work and retained the allegiance of the majority of the population in Ireland as a whole. From the 1830s onwards, many Anglican dioceses were merged, in view of declining membership. The sees of Derry and Raphoe were united in 1834. It is for this reason that the united diocese has two cathedrals.

== Cathedrals ==
- The Cathedral Church of St Columb, Derry, Northern Ireland.
- The Cathedral Church of St Eunan, Raphoe, County Donegal, Republic of Ireland.

== List of Bishops ==
The following is a basic list the bishops.

- 1831–1853: Richard Ponsonby
- 1853–1867: William Higgin
- 1867–1896: William Alexander
- 1896–1916: George Alexander Chadwick
- 1916–1944: Joseph Irvine Peacocke
- 1945–1958: Robert McNeil Boyd
- 1958–1969: Charles John Tyndall
- 1970–1975: Cuthbert Irvine Peacocke
- 1975–1980: Robert "Robin" Eames
- 1980–2002: James Mehaffey
- 2002–2019: Kenneth (Ken) Raymond Good
- 2019–present: Andrew Forster

== See also ==
- List of Anglican dioceses in the United Kingdom and Ireland
- Roman Catholic Diocese of Derry
- Roman Catholic Diocese of Raphoe
- Plantation of Ulster
