= Anthony Peacocke =

British police officer

Joseph Anthony Peacocke, CBE (1 September 1908 – 12 November 1975), was a police officer in the United Kingdom. He was Inspector-General of the Royal Ulster Constabulary throughout most of 1969, during the onset of The Troubles.

== Early life and education ==
Peacocke was born in Bangor, County Down, in 1908, the son of Rt. Rev. Joseph Irvine Peacocke, a Church of Ireland bishop. His brother was Cuthbert Peacocke, a future Dean of Belfast who was later to succeed their father as Bishop of Derry and Raphoe. Peacocke was educated at Sedbergh School and Gonville and Caius College, Cambridge, where he studied natural sciences. He joined the RUC as a cadet officer in 1932.

== Police career ==
During his career, prior to his appointment as Inspector-General, he served in Ballymoney, Belfast and Enniskillen. He was Deputy Inspector-General from 1963 onwards. He was appointed as Inspector-General on 5 February 1969.

== Inspector-General ==
During the increasingly violent period in Northern Ireland in 1969, Peacocke initially resisted the deployment of the British Army, but he changed his view following a telephone call from Graham Shillington, the Deputy Inspector-General, early on the morning of 13 August. The extent of disorder in Northern Ireland at that time prompted the commissioning of the Hunt Report, which was published in October 1969. A few days earlier, Peacocke had been asked to resign, and his resignation, although tendered immediately, was not announced until 10 October.

== Final years ==
Upon retiring from the RUC, Peacocke moved to Somerset. He died in South Cheriton near Templecombe on 12 November 1975, and was survived by his wife, Maud.
