= Houston McKelvey =

Church of Ireland priest and Dean of Belfast

The Very Reverend Houston McKelvey
- Dean of Belfast
- Church: Church of Ireland
- Installed: June 2001
- Term ended: 31 March 2011
- Predecessor: Jack Shearer
- Successor: John Mann

Personal details
- Born: Robert Samuel James Houston McKelvey; 1942 County Antrim, Northern Ireland
- Died: 19 March 2026 (aged 83–84) Coleraine, Northern Ireland
- Spouse: Roberta McKelvey
- Education: Royal Belfast Academical Institution
- Alma mater: Queen's University Belfast; Trinity College Dublin; Northwestern University

Robert Samuel James Houston McKelvey (1942 – 19 March 2026) was an Irish priest in the Church of Ireland who served as Dean of Belfast from 2001 to 2011.

== Early life and education ==
McKelvey was born and raised in County Antrim and was described at the time of his appointment as dean as "a Muckamore man". He was educated at Muckamore Primary School and the Royal Belfast Academical Institution. He later studied at Queen's University Belfast, where he took a primary honours degree in geography and a master's degree in education, and at Trinity College Dublin in theology. He also held a Doctor of Ministry degree from the Methodist seminary at Northwestern University in Evanston, Illinois.

== Ministry ==
McKelvey was ordained in the Diocese of Connor. Before becoming dean, he served in the suburban parishes of Dunmurry and Kilmakee on the southern edge of Belfast.

From 1975 to 1982, McKelvey was editor of The Church of Ireland Gazette. He was later appointed Secretary to the Church of Ireland General Synod Board of Education in Northern Ireland, a role he held for 19 years before his appointment as Dean of Belfast in 2001.

As Dean of Belfast, McKelvey was based at St Anne's Cathedral, Belfast. He succeeded Jack Shearer and entered office in June 2001. During his deanery, he continued the cathedral's annual Black Santa charity sit-out, a tradition begun in 1976, and was closely associated with fundraising for local causes.

McKelvey also oversaw major developments at St Anne's Cathedral, including the installation of the Spire of Hope in 2007. At his retirement, Belfast City Council credited him with presiding over major civic and commemorative services, helping commission the Spire of Hope, maintaining the Black Santa tradition, and strengthening relations with St Peter's Cathedral, Belfast.

McKelvey was noted for ecumenical engagement in Belfast. During his time as dean, he worked with Monsignor Tom Toner of St Peter's Cathedral, including joint services and public acts of remembrance following the September 11 attacks.

McKelvey retired on 31 March 2011 and was succeeded by John Mann.

== Other work and honours ==
Alongside his parish and cathedral ministry, McKelvey served for 29 years as a chaplain in the Chaplains' Branch of the Territorial Army, including service to the Ulster and Scottish Gunners. He was described as the first reserve-forces chaplain to receive the Queen's Volunteer Reserves Medal.

In the 2010 New Year Honours, McKelvey was appointed an Officer of the Order of the British Empire (OBE) for services to the community in Northern Ireland.

McKelvey also served on the Belfast local education authority, on school governing boards, and was a former member of the Police Authority for Northern Ireland. He was also active in Scouting as a county chaplain, and was described as a writer, broadcaster and communicator.

== Personal life and death ==
McKelvey was married to Roberta McKelvey, who was a former diocesan president of the Mothers' Union. He died suddenly on 19 March 2026 at Coleraine. Funeral notices described him as the father of one son and grandfather of two grandsons.

Church of Ireland titles
Preceded by Jack Shearer	Dean of Belfast; 2001–2011	Succeeded by John Mann
