= Bishop of Derry and Raphoe =

Church of Ireland bishopric

Arms of the Bishops of Derry and Raphoe

The Bishop of Derry and Raphoe is the Church of Ireland Ordinary of the united Diocese of Derry and Raphoe in the Province of Armagh.

The united diocese has two Episcopal sees, one at St Columb's Cathedral, Derry in Northern Ireland, and the other at the Cathedral Church of St. Eunan, Raphoe in the Republic of Ireland. The current incumbent is Andrew Forster, formerly Archdeacon of Ardboe, who was elected on 29 August 2019, and consecrated on 8 December 2019.

== List of bishops ==
Bishops of Derry and Raphoe
From	Until	Incumbent	Notes
1834	1853	Richard Ponsonby	Appointed Bishop of Derry in 1831, and became Bishop of Derry and Raphoe when the two dioceses united on 5 September 1834. Died in office on 27 October 1853.
1853	1867	William Higgin	Translated from Limerick, Ardfert and Aghadoe. Nominated on 18 November 1853 and appointed by letters patent on 7 December 1853. Died in office on 12 July 1867.
1867	1896	William Alexander	Nominated on 27 July and consecrated on 6 October 1867. Translated to Armagh on 25 February 1896.
1896	1916	George Chadwick	Elected on 18 February and consecrated on 25 March 1896. Resigned on 31 January 1916 and died on 27 February 1923.
1916	1944	Joseph Peacocke	Elected on 15 March and consecrated on 25 April 1916. Resigned on 31 December 1944 and died on 31 January 1962.
1945	1958	Robert McNeil Boyd	Translated from Killaloe and Clonfert. Elected on 18 March and confirmed on 20 March 1945. Died in office on 1 July 1958.
1958	1969	Charles Tyndall	Translated from Kilmore, Elphin and Ardagh. Elected and confirmed on 14 October 1958. Resigned on 30 September 1969 and died on 3 April 1971.
1970	1975	Cuthbert Peacocke	Formerly Dean of Belfast. Elected on 16 October 1969 and consecrated on 6 January 1970. Resigned on 31 March 1975 and died on 6 April 1994.
1975	1980	Robin Eames	Elected on 9 May and consecrated on 9 June 1975. Translated to Down and Dromore in 1980, and subsequently to Armagh in 1986.
1980	2002	James Mehaffey	Elected on 27 June and consecrated on 7 September 1980. Resigned on 31 January 2002 and died on 6 January 2020.
2002	May 2019	Ken Good	Elected on 13 March and consecrated on 11 June 2002. Resigned in May 2019
2019	Present	Andrew Forster	Elected in August 2019 and Ordained on 8 December 2019.
