= Cyril Elliott =

Irish clergyman

The Rt Rev Dr Cyril Elliott MA

Dean of Belfast
- In office 1945–1956
- Preceded by: William Kerr
- Succeeded by: Cuthbert Peacocke

Bishop of Connor
- In office 1956–1969

Personal details
- Born: 18 November 1890 Dublin, Ireland
- Died: 3 April 1977 Belfast, Northern Ireland
- Education: Trent College, Trinity College Dublin

Robert Cyril Hamilton Glover Elliott (known as Cyril; 1890–1977) was an eminent Irish clergyman in the middle of the 20th century. Ordained in 1915, he began his career as a chaplain to the Forces, after which he was Rector of All Saints, Belfast, Vicar of Ballymacarrett then Rector of Downpatrick. Promotion to be Dean of St Anne's Cathedral, Belfast, followed, after which he was elevated to the episcopate as Bishop of Connor. In retirement he continued to serve the Church as a Sub-Prelate of the Order of St John of Jerusalem.

== Early life ==
Robert Cyril Hamilton Glover Elliott was born in November 1890 in Dublin, Ireland. His father, Revd. Canon Anthony Lewis Elliott, was the Rector of Killiney, Dublin. As a rector, Elliot's father acted as an administrator not only to the people in his parish, but also to his son. Cyril Elliott was introduced to a life of religion at a very young age, participating in church daily with his father.

=== Education ===
Cyril Elliott was educated at Aravon School, Bray; Trent College, Derbyshire; and Trinity College Dublin. Elliott was an outstanding student, and while at Trinity College, he further progressed his infatuation with following in his fathers footsteps by fully engulfing himself in classes on Catholicism and early Greek and Roman thought. These classes stimulated his mind and helped prepare Elliott for a life involved with both education and religion.

== Career ==
Cyril Elliott's life was filled with numerous job opportunities, which eventually led to numerous job titles.

=== World War I ===
In 1914, once finished with schooling, Elliott was ordained as a curate. During World War I, Elliott was appointed as chaplain to the forces. At his interview with the Chaplain-General, it was noted that he could ride and speak French, and he was graded A1. He was posted to France in February 1917 with 2/7th Kings Liverpool Regiment. Elliott served soldiers, sailors, marines and airmen during his time as chaplain, and even administered services for the families of many soldiers. A brave asset to the war, Elliott was highly regarded on two occasions for his performance in duties under heavy shellfire.

=== Religious vocation ===
After his duty to the military was fulfilled, Elliott moved to Bangor, County Down, and then was appointed Rector of All Saints' in Belfast. From 1930 to 1938, Cyril Elliott served as the vicar of St Patrick's, Belfast. Because of his large stature, 6'9", Elliott was called by townspeople "The Big Vicar." In 1938 he left Belfast for Downpatrick to become Dean of Down. But he was on the move again when, in 1945, he came back to Belfast as dean of its cathedral. Under constant pressure and stress from other clergy members, Elliott found his task as dean difficult. With notice of his stress, members of the parish rallied around Elliot and supported him in his creation of a Building and Appeal Fund, expressing the hope that people of all denominations would find a spiritual home in the cathedral.

=== Enthronement ===
In 1956, Dean Elliott became Bishop Cyril when, on 4 October 1956, he was enthroned in Lisburn Cathedral as Bishop of Connor. He was chairman of a committee dealing with Diocesan Ordination Bursaries Fund which ensured that no one with qualifications and the vocation was debarred from the ministry for want of money. As bishop, he was present at the consecration of the cathedral's apse and ambulatory on 17 April 1959. At the Lambeth Conference in 1958 he accepted the Coventry Cross from the provost of Coventry which hangs in a frame in the ambulatory of the cathedral.

== Retirement ==
Cyril resigned in 1969 after 13 years as bishop. It is argued that Elliot could have served a much longer term had it not been compulsory in the Church of Ireland to retire at the age of 78. He continued to keep himself busy, saying that his engagement book was "just as full as ever." A bachelor, he had a keen interest in sport and was a life member of Belfast Boat Club. Golf was his favourite recreation.

== Death ==
He died, aged 86, in 1977 and was cremated at Roselawn on the outskirts of Belfast after a funeral service in St. Polycarp's, Finaghy. The rector, Rev James Hall, officiated at the service with the Primate, Dr Simms, Bishop Arthur Butler of Connor and Bishop George Quin of Down. Archbishop Simms mentioned that Cyril Elliott had followed the great and highly valued tradition of a person-to-person ministry and lived, to a remarkable degree, in the lives of others.

== Notes ==
Church of Ireland titles
Preceded by William Shaw Kerr	Dean of Belfast; 1945–1956	Succeeded by Cuthbert Irvine Peacocke
Preceded by Charles King Irwin	Bishop of Connor; 1956–1969	Succeeded by Arthur Hamilton Butler
