= Thomas Collins (bishop of Meath) =

Bishop of Meath

The Most Reverend Thomas Gibson George Collins DD

Dean of Belfast
- In office 1919–1926
- Preceded by: Charles Grierson
- Succeeded by: Henry Brett

Bishop of Meath
- In office 1926–1927

Personal details
- Born: 2 April 1873 Dublin
- Died: 3 July 1927 Navan
- Spouse: Kathleen Lily Bell née Hollwey
- Education: Trinity College, Dublin

Thomas Gibson George Collins was Bishop of Meath for a short time in the second quarter of the 20th century.

Ordained in 1896, he was firstly a curate at Maralin before becoming Rector of Rathfriland then Warrenpoint and St James’ Belfast; and finally, before his ordination to the episcopate, Dean of St Anne's Cathedral, Belfast.

== Notes ==
Religious titles
Preceded by Charles Thornton Primrose Grierson	Dean of Belfast; 1919 – 1926	Succeeded by Henry Robert Brett
Preceded by Benjamin John Plunket	Bishop of Meath; 1926 – 1927	Succeeded by John Orr
