= Robert Brett (disambiguation) =

Robert Brett may refer to:

- Robert Brett (1851–1929), politician and doctor in Canada
- Robert Brett (MP) (c. 1566–1620), MP for Dover
- Robert Brett (surgeon) (1808–1874), English surgeon
- Bob Brett (1953–2021), Australian tennis coach

== See also ==
- Henry Robert Brett (1868–1932), Dean of Belfast
