= St Eunan's Cathedral, Raphoe =

Church in County Donegal, Ireland

Coordinates: 54°52′26″N 07°35′54″W

Raphoe Cathedral
- St Eunan's Cathedral, Raphoe
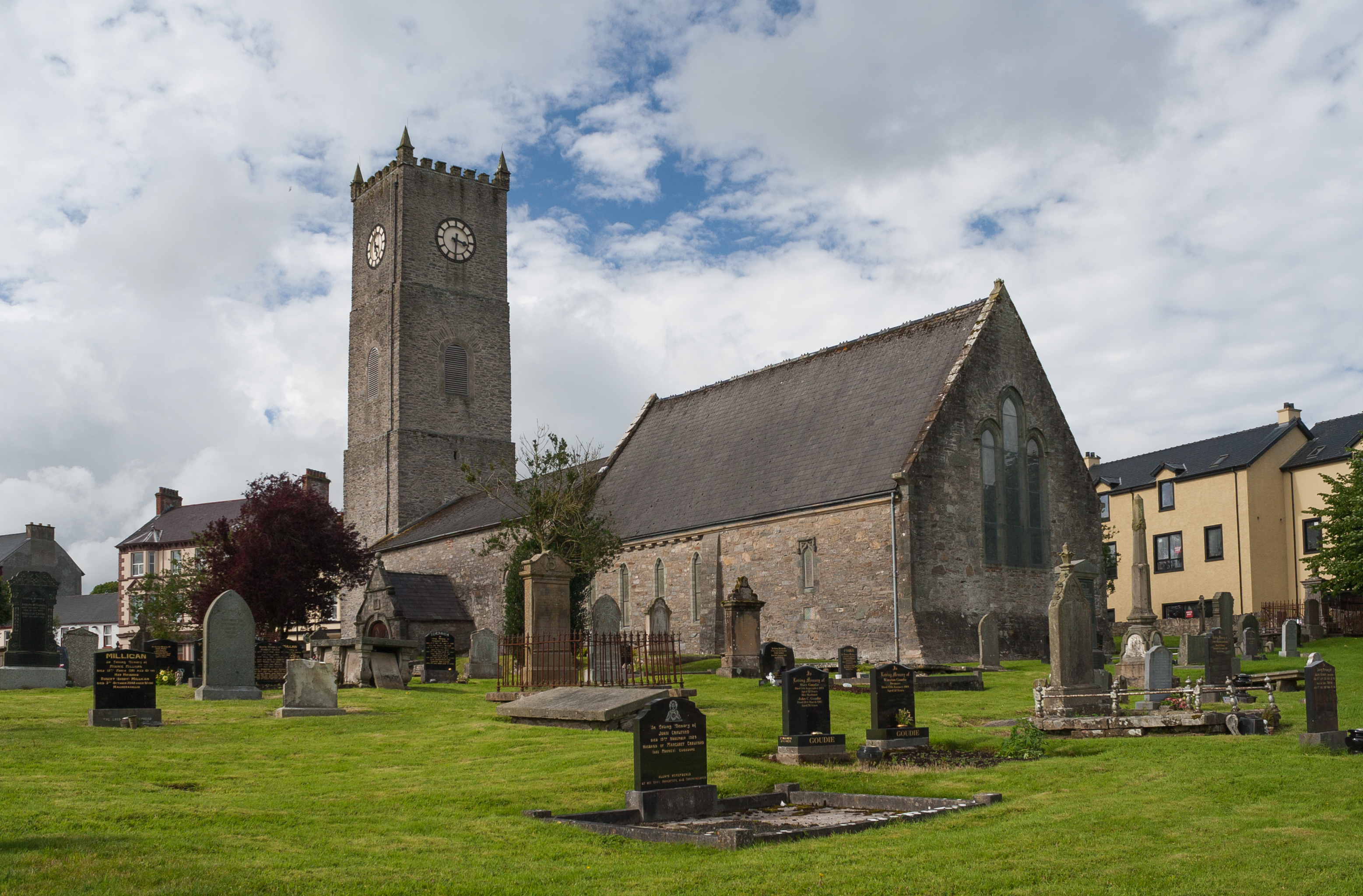
- Raphoe Cathedral
- Denomination: Church of Ireland
- Previous denomination: Roman Catholic
- Website: http://cathedral.raphoe.anglican.org/

Administration
- Province: Province of Armagh
- Diocese: Diocese of Derry and Raphoe

Clergy
- Bishop: The Right Revd. Andrew Forster
- Dean: The Very Rev Elizabeth Fitzgerald

St Eunan's Cathedral (/ˈjuːnən/ YOO-nən, also known as Raphoe Cathedral, is one of two cathedral churches of the United Dioceses of Derry and Raphoe (united in 1834) in the Church of Ireland. It is located in Raphoe, County Donegal and is dedicated to Saint Eunan (Adomnán of Iona) (627/8 – 704) who was abbot of Iona (679–704). The other diocesan cathedral is St Columb's Cathedral in Derry.

== History ==
The oldest substantive part of the present building is the south-east corner, which dates back to the 12th century, although two pieces of a sculptured door lintel dating from around the 9th century are believed to be from the original monastery and church of Raphoe, as founded by St Eunan. The rest of the cathedral is a mixture of successive rebuilding and alterations dating from the 17th to late 19th centuries. The original building was cruciform in shape.

A virtual re-building of the medieval cathedral was directed by The Rt. Rev. Dr. George Montgomery from around 1605. Montgomery had been chaplain to King James I, and was nominated not only Bishop of Raphoe, but of Clogher and Derry at the same time.

After centuries of modifications and restorations, much of the current building dates from the 1730s. The entrance is by the porch under the tower built in 1738 by Bishop Forster (1716-1744).

By the 1870s, the building had again become shabby and neglected. It attracted the unfavourable criticism of many church people and ecclesiologists and one high church architect, Sir Thomas Drew, described the cathedral as "the most neglected church in the diocese though situated in the richest part of Donegal." In 1892, Drew was commissioned to begin a plan of restoration which, commenced in 1893, uncovered much of the medieval fabric while "medievalizing" the greater part of the rest of the building. This restoration, funded by the Knox family, involved partial rebuilding which also saw the transepts largely absorbed into the main line of the church, so that it has a long narrow form, and added much stained glass, and a decorative western doorway. The cathedral shares the characteristic of many medieval church buildings, where larger bodies of clergy offered more elaborate liturgies, in that the quire or chancel is longer than the nave.

Medieval features still extant include a bishop's seat (sedilla), shamrock-topped columns, a piscina and an early vestry window. There is a tall square tower at the western end.

== Related remains ==
Near the cathedral building are the remnants of a consistorial court building and a large bishop's palace.

== Burials ==
- Alexander Cairncross, Bishop of Raphoe
- Alexander Montgomery (1720–1800) ("Old Sandy"), MP for County Donegal for 32 years

== Gallery ==
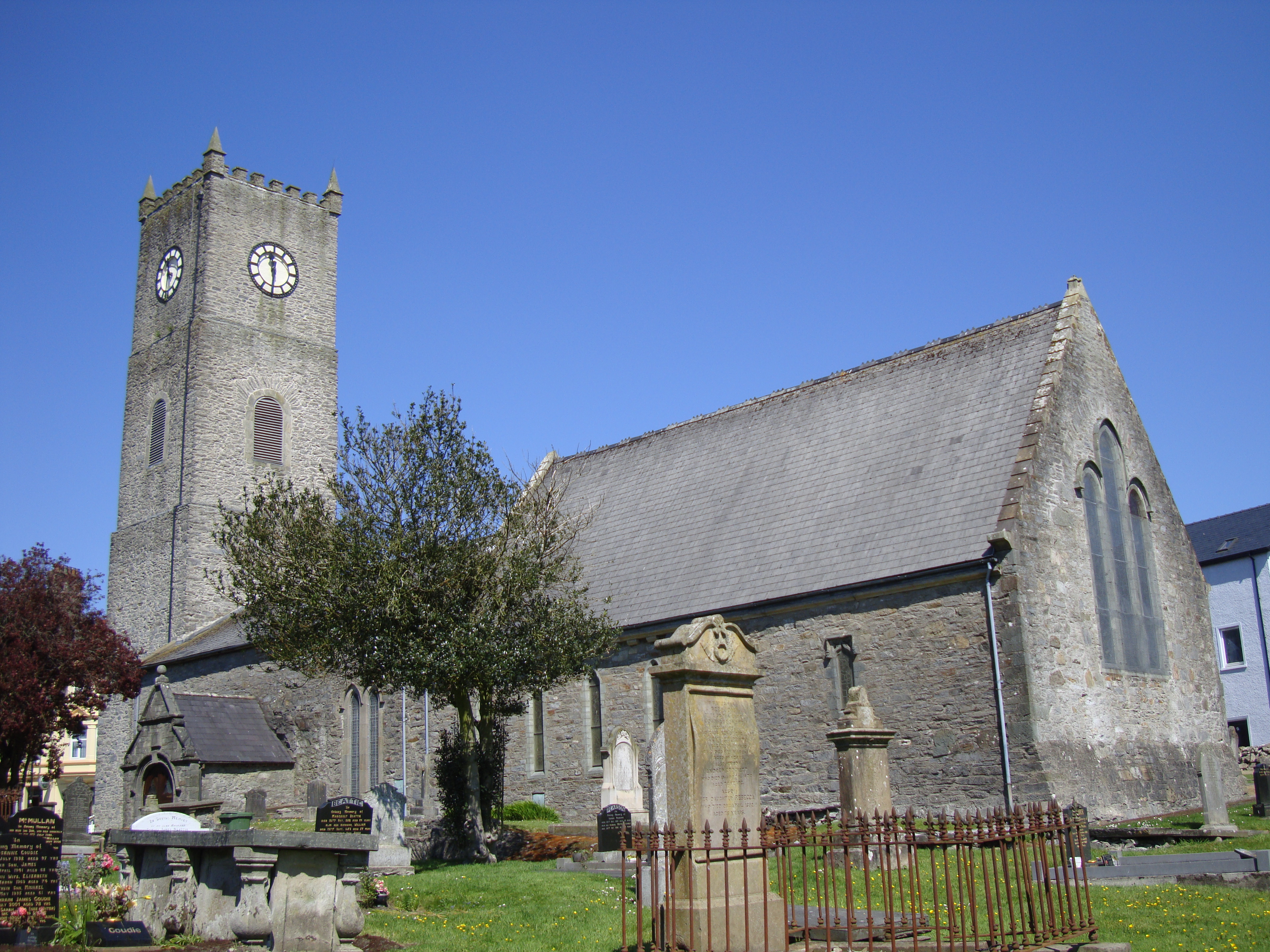
St Eunan's Cathedral, Raphoe

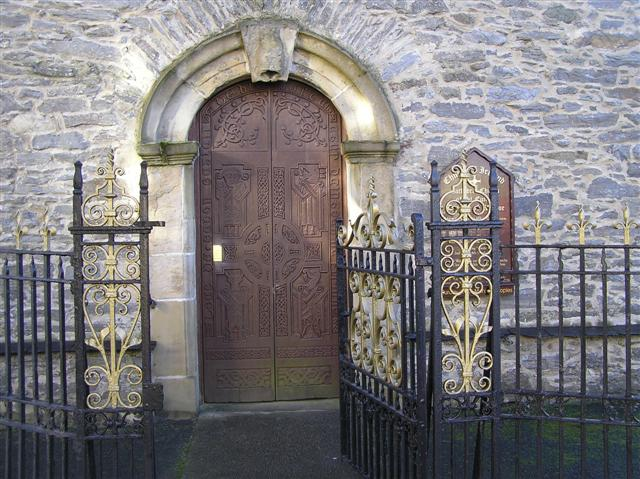
Entrance doors of the Cathedral

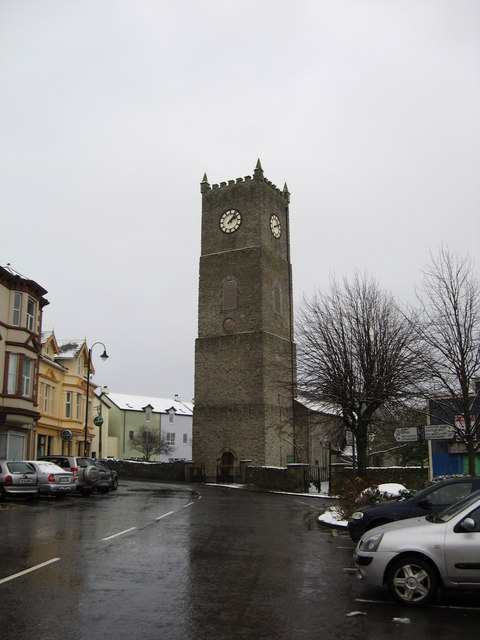
St Eunan's Cathedral, Raphoe

== See also ==
- Dean of Raphoe
- Bishop of Derry and Raphoe
- Cathedral of St Eunan and St Columba in the Roman Catholic Diocese of Raphoe
