= Diocese of Derry =

Diocese of Derry (Irish: Deoise Dhoire) may refer to:

- Roman Catholic Diocese of Derry
- Diocese of Derry and Raphoe (Church of Ireland)
