= Seagoe parish =

Coordinates: 54.43525°N 6.42568°W

- St Gobhan's parish
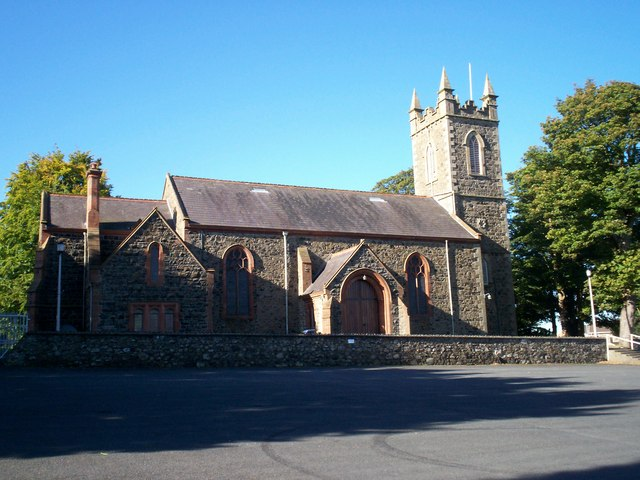
- Seagoe Parish Church, 2007 (prior to the building of the Parish Centre)
- Seagoe parish
- Location: Seagoe Road, Portadown
- Country: Northern Ireland
- Denomination: Church of Ireland
- Churchmanship: Low Church
- Website: seagoe.co.uk

History
- Founded: 540 A.D; 1660; 1814
- Founder: St Gobhan
- Consecrated: 28 June 1816

Architecture
- Architect: Thomas Drew
- Architectural type: Gothic

Administration
- Province: Armagh
- Archdiocese: Dromore
- Diocese: Down and Dromore
- Deanery: Clanbrassil
- Parish: Seagoe

Clergy
- Rector: Revd Canon Terence Cadden
- Dean: Canon Gareth Harron

Seagoe parish or St Gobhan's parish is an ecclesiastical parish of the Church of Ireland that is located in Portadown, County Armagh, Northern Ireland. It is on one of the oldest recorded sites of Christianity in Ireland. Christian links to the area date back to the early 500 AD's. It was founded by St. Gobhan.

The current rector is Terence Cadden, having been installed in 2006. The current rector's predecessor is David Chillingworth, Primus of the Scottish Episcopal Church. Another previous rector was Jack Shearer, who later became the Dean of Belfast.

== Parish Centre ==
In 2010 the parish centre was opened by the previous rector David Chillingworth. The building cost £1.5 million. It contains a series of multi-functional rooms and classrooms, a main hall and a rotunda with a meeting area, coffee bar and circular prayer/quiet room.

== Organisations ==
The current organisations that form part of the parish ministry are the following:

- Seagoe Youth Group
- Sunday School
- Youth Fellowship
- Church Lads’ Brigade
- Church Girls' Brigade
- Junior Youth Club
- Senior Youth Club
- St. Patrick's Youth Club
- After School activity Club
- Mothers’ Union
- Prayer Meeting
- Alpha Course
- Forward Focus Development Group
- Healing Prayer Group
- Choir
- Music group

== Seagoe Primary School ==
The parish is linked to Seagoe Primary School, having established the school. The link is reflected in the school ethos.
