= Henry Griffin =

Irish Anglican bishop (1786 – 5 April 1866)

- Bishop of Limerick, Ardfert and Aghadoe
- In office: 1854–1866

Personal details
- Born: 1786
- Died: 5 April 1866
- Denomination: Church of Ireland (Anglican)
- Spouse: Jane Eyre née Lysaght
- Education: Trinity College, Dublin

Henry Griffin (1786 – 5 April 1866) was an eminent Irish Anglican bishop in the mid 19th century.

He was born in 1786 in Wexford and educated at Trinity College, Dublin. He was the incumbent at Clonfeacle from 1829 until 1854 when he was consecrated Bishop of Limerick, Ardfert and Aghadoe. He died in post on 5 April 1866. He had become a Doctor of Divinity (DD).

Church of Ireland titles
Preceded by William Higgin	Bishop of Limerick, Ardfert and Aghadoe; 1854–1866	Succeeded by Charles Graves
