= Ken Good =

Kenneth Raymond Good (born 1 November 1952) is a retired Church of Ireland (Anglican) Bishop who served as Bishop of Derry and Raphoe from 11 June 2002 - 31 May 2019.

== Early life and priestly ministry ==
Born on 1 November 1952 and educated at Trinity College, Dublin he was ordained in 1977. He began his career as a curate in Belfast after which he was chaplain and head of Religious Education at Ashton School, Cork.

In 1984 he became rector of Dunganstown; and in 1990 of Shankill Parish, Lurgan. His final appointment before elevation to the episcopate was as Archdeacon of Dromore.

== Episcopal ministry ==
Good was elected bishop of Derry and Raphoe on 13 March and consecrated on 11 June 2002. He went on to serve in the diocese for seventeen years and engaged heavily in the wider social and political life of the diocese. In his time as bishop he brought the Church of Ireland Synod to the city for the first time.

Good announced his retirement in October 2018 and officially retired from the post in May 2019 and one of his last public interventions was an appeal to politicians to restore the devolved assembly in Northern Ireland.

Bishop Good developed a strong working relationship and personal friendship with Bishop Donal McKeown and after his retirement Ken Good's 'strategic leadership to the local church to engage fully with the community throughout his ordained ministry, most of which was in the complex community of Northern Ireland" was recognised when both men were awarded a prestigious peacemaking prize.

He was succeeded by The Right Rev’d. Andrew Forster, Archdeacon of Ardboe in the diocese of Armagh who was elected as the new Bishop in August 2019 and ordained in St Patrick's Cathedral Armagh on 8 December 2019.

Bishop Good praised his successor and described Bishop Andrew as the perfect choice for the Diocese of Derry and Raphoe and had confidence that he would serve the Diocese Faithfully and with diligence.

Church of Ireland titles
Preceded by James Mehaffey	Bishop of Derry and Raphoe; 2002–2019	Succeeded by Andrew Forster
