= Samuel Crooks =

The Very Reverend Samuel Crooks OBE TD

Dean of Belfast
- In office 1970–1985
- Preceded by: Cuthbert Peacocke
- Succeeded by: Jack Shearer

Personal details
- Born: 20 January 1920
- Died: 21 August 1986 (aged 66)
- Spouse: Isabel née Kennedy
- Education: Trinity College, Dublin

Samuel Bennett Crooks OBE TD was Dean of Belfast in the last third of the 20th century.

He was born on 20 January 1920 into an ecclesiastical family (his father was the Rev. S. B. Crooks, Rector of Killough, County Down and then St Stephen’s, Belfast) and educated at Down High School and Trinity College, Dublin. He was ordained in 1944 and became Dean's Vicar and then Vicar Choral at St Anne’s Cathedral, Belfast, until 1949, when he was appointed Rector of St John’s, Orangefield. Later he became Rector of Christ Church Lurgan, then the largest parish in the Church of Ireland, Rural Dean of Hillsborough and Archdeacon of Dromore. In 1970 he became Dean of Belfast, a post he held for 15 years. While at the Cathedral he launched the annual Christmas "sit out" to raise funds for local charities for which he became known as the Black Santa. https://www.belfastcathedral.org/black-santa/. He was made a Chaplain of the Venerable Order of St John of Jerusalem in the Queen's Birthday Honours in February 1976., and appointed an Officer of the Order of the British Empire (OBE) in the 1981 Birthday Honours. He died in 1986 aged 66 in a car crash on the Saintfield Road near Carryduff on his way to a meeting at Belfast Cathedral.

In December 2014 an Ulster History Circle blue plaque was unveiled in his memory at St Anne's Cathedral, Belfast.

== Notes ==
Church of Ireland titles
Preceded by Cuthbert Irvine Peacocke	Dean of Belfast; 1970 – 1985	Succeeded by Jack Shearer
