= Jack Shearer (priest) =

The Very Reverend Jack Shearer MA

Dean of Belfast
- In office 1985–2001
- Preceded by: Samuel Crooks
- Succeeded by: Houston McKelvey

Personal details
- Born: 30 December 1926 Belfast, Northern Ireland
- Died: 12 January 2001 (aged 74) Belfast, Northern Ireland
- Spouse: Morag Williamson
- Children: 2
- Education: Trinity College, Dublin

John "Jack" Shearer OBE (30 December 1926 – 12 January 2001) was a Church of Ireland clergyman and the Dean of Belfast cathedral.

== Life ==
He was born in Belfast and educated at Belfast Technical High School before studying at Trinity College, Dublin, where he graduated in 1950.

He was ordained in 1950. After two years in Magheralin Parish, County Down he served for seven years in St Patrick's Parish, Ballymacarrett, before becoming rector of Magheradoll, Ballynahinch. He then became Rector of Seagoe from 1964 to 1985, becoming Archdeacon of Dromore in 1970. He was appointed Dean of Belfast in 1985.

As dean he worked with his Roman Catholic opposite number to organise combined community services and other bridge building activities. He continued the tradition of the "Black Santa", holding "sitouts" during the Christmas period which raised millions of pounds for charity and in 1993 was awarded the OBE for services to the community. During his time as dean he oversaw the major reorganisation of the Cathedral precincts, the provision of facilities at the West Front for physically challenged persons and dedicated the "Patience", "Faith" and "Charity" stained glass windows.

He died in post in 2001. He had married Morag Williamson and left two children.

Church of Ireland titles
Preceded by Samuel Bennett Crooks	Dean of Belfast; 1985–2001	Succeeded by Robert Samuel James Houston McKelvey
