= Spire of Hope =

Outdoor sculpture in Belfast, Northern Ireland

Coordinates: 54°36′10″N 5°55′42″W

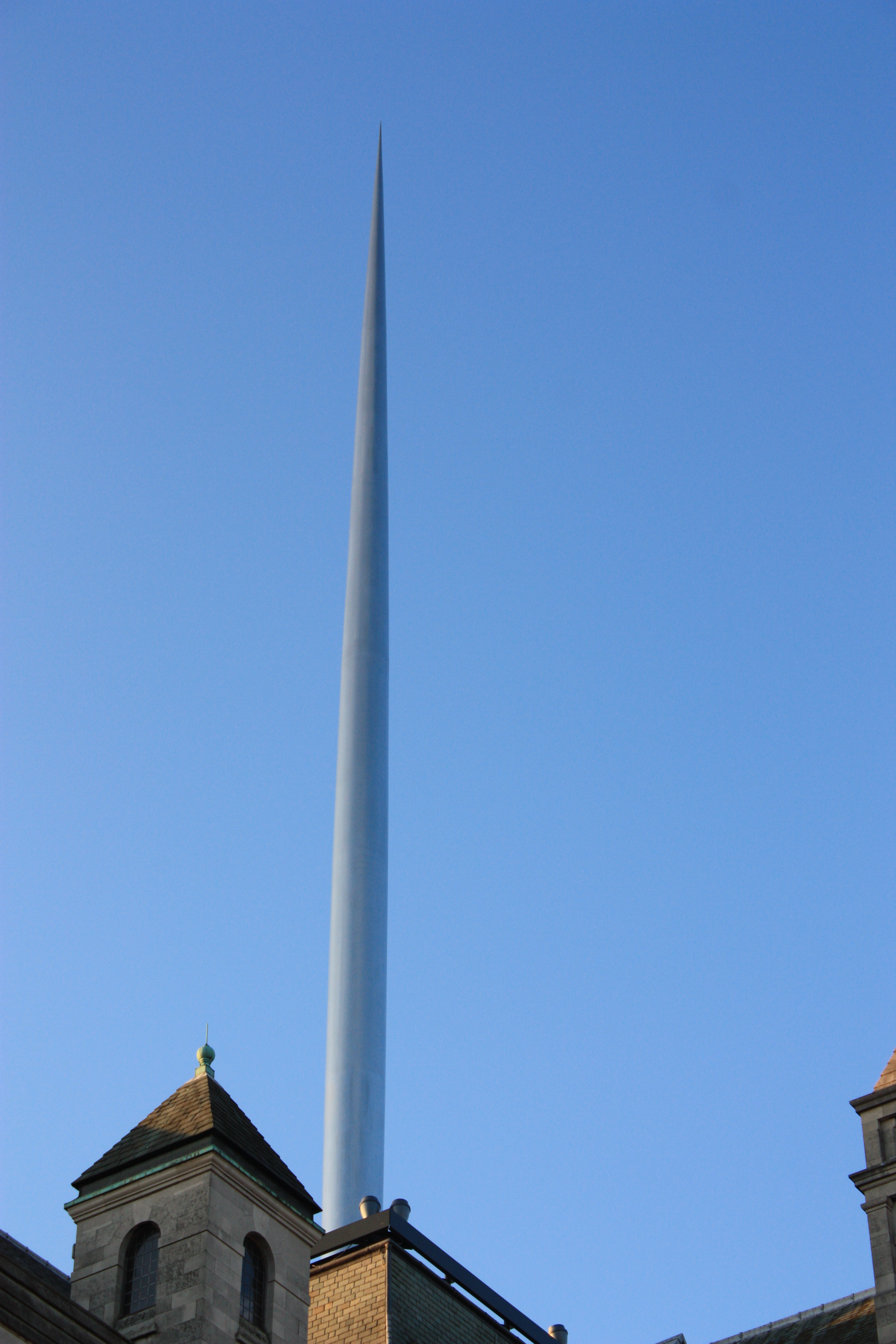
Spire of Hope , St Anne's Cathedral, December 2009

The Spire of Hope is an outdoor sculpture located in Belfast, Northern Ireland. The 40-metre spire is built into the roof of St Anne's Cathedral in the city's Cathedral Quarter.

In April 2007 the steel spire was installed on top of the cathedral. The structure is illuminated at night and is part of a wider redevelopment planned for the Cathedral Quarter. The base section of the spire protrudes through a glass platform in the cathedral's roof directly above the choir stalls, allowing visitors to view it from the nave.

== History ==
The Spire of Hope came about as a result of a 2004 competition for a new spire at St Anne's Cathedral. It was run by the cathedral and Laganside Corporation to celebrate the centenary of St Anne's being consecrated as a cathedral. The competition was open to architects aged under-40 that worked in either Northern Ireland or the Republic of Ireland. The competition was won by Belfast-based architects Robert Jamison and Colin Conn who came up with the concept of a 40-metre steel spire for the cathedral. The spire was constructed in Frauenfeld, Switzerland and installed on the tower of St Anne's in 2007. The project cost £850,000. The Spire was dedicated in September 2007 by the Archbishop of Armagh, Alan Harper, in an ecumenical service that also included representatives from other Northern Irish Christian denominations including Presbyterian Church, Methodist Church, the Roman Catholic Church and Mark Sisk, the Bishop of New York of the American Episcopal Church.

The Spire of Hope was nominated for a Royal Institution of Chartered Surveyors Award, but was unsuccessful. It was constructed with a glass roof to allow people to see it from inside the cathedral.

== Reception ==
Reaction to the Spire of Hope was mixed. Some opined it looked like a needle rather than a spire whilst others praised it for being imaginative and added to the cathedral. An observance from the Church Times newspaper, usually covering the Church of England, noted what the Church of Ireland spent on the Spire of Hope while also disbanding the cathedral choir on cost cutting grounds. Some locals nicknamed it "The Dean's Toothpick" or "The Rod to God".
