= Stephen Forde =

Northern Irish clergyman

The Very Reverend Stephen Forde
- Dean of Belfast
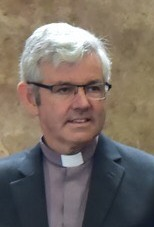
- Church: Church of Ireland
- Province: Province of Armagh
- Diocese: Diocese of Connor
- In office: 2018 to present
- Predecessor: John Mann

Orders
- Ordination: 1986 (deacon); 1987 (priest)

Personal details
- Born: 1961 (age 64–65) Banbridge, Northern Ireland
- Denomination: Anglicanism
- Spouse: Fiona Forde
- Children: Three
- Education: University of Edinburgh; Trinity College, Dublin

Stephen Forde (born 1961) is a Church of Ireland clergyman, and the Dean of Belfast Cathedral.

== Education ==
He was born in Banbridge and educated at Campbell College. He studied at the University of Edinburgh and Trinity College, Dublin.

== Ordained ministry ==
Forde was ordained in the Church of Ireland as a deacon in 1986 and as a priest in 1987. After a curacy at St Mary, Crumlin Road, he was chaplain to Samuel Poyntz, the then Bishop of Connor; and also chaplain of Queen's University Belfast (QUB) from 1989 until 1995. He was the incumbent at Booterstown from 1995 to 1999, then Larne.

In 2006, Forde was appointed Archdeacon of Dalriada. In October 2017, it was announced that he would be the next Dean of St Anne's Cathedral, Belfast. He was installed as the 14th Dean of Belfast during a service on 4 February 2018.
