= George Chadwick (bishop) =

George Alexander Chadwick DD (10 October 1840 – 29 December 1923) was the Bishop of Derry and Raphoe.

Born on 10 October 1840 and educated at Trinity College, Dublin, he was ordained in 1863 and began his career as a curate at St Anne, Belfast. He was then appointed Rector of St James, Belfast where he remained until 1872. He was Rector of St Mark's Armagh until 1886 when he became Dean of Armagh. In 1896 he was elevated to the episcopate, being elected on 18 February and consecrated on 25 March.

An eminent author, he resigned his see on 31 January 1916 and died on 29 December 1923

Church of Ireland titles
Preceded by William Alexander	Bishop of Derry and Raphoe; 1896–1915	Succeeded by Joseph Peacocke
