= Robert Boyd (bishop) =

Robert McNeil Boyd MC (12 February 1890 – 1 July 1958) was the 11th Bishop of Killaloe, Kilfenora, Clonfert and Kilmacduagh from 1943 until 1945, when he was translated to Derry and Raphoe.

Educated at St Andrew's College and Trinity College, Dublin and ordained in 1912, to the title of the assistant curacy of Fiddown. From 1915 to 1919 he was a Chaplain to the Forces. He served in France from May to October, 1915, in Egypt for a short time and then for nearly three years, as Senior Chaplain in Salonika where he was awarded the Military Cross and Mentioned in Despatches. In Salonika, he contracted Malaria and he was invalided out of the Army in 1920. He then held incumbencies at Ballingarry and Shinrone after which (1936 to 1945) he was Dean of St Flannan's Cathedral, Killaloe, a post he held until his ordination to the episcopate. Boyd was elected Bishop of Derry and Raphoe on 18 March and confirmed on 20 March 1945.

His first wife died in 1955, and he remarried in 1957.

Church of Ireland titles
Preceded by Henry Patton	Bishop of Killaloe and Clonfert; 1943–1945	Succeeded by Hedley Webster
Preceded by Joseph Peacocke	Bishop of Derry and Raphoe; 1945–1958	Succeeded by Charles Tyndall
