= Henry Brett (priest) =

The Very Reverend Henry Robert Brett

Dean of Belfast
- In office 1926–1932
- Preceded by: Thomas Collins
- Succeeded by: William Kerr

Personal details
- Born: 18 October 1868
- Died: 2 November 1932
- Spouse: Constance née White
- Education: Trinity College, Dublin

Henry Robert Brett was Dean of Belfast in the second quarter of the 20th century.
Ordained in 1893, his first posts were curacies at Coleraine and Belfast after which he was Vicar of St Peter's Belfast and then Archdeacon of Connor before his appointment as Dean of Belfast.

== Arms ==
Coat of arms of Henry Brett
Notes Confirmed 25 October 1921 by Sir Nevile Rodwell Wilkinson, Ulster King of Arms. Crest On a wreath of the colours a crane reguardant with wings addorsed Sable charged with a fess cotised Argent. Escutcheon Per pale Argent and Sable on a fess cotised a cross flory between two trefoils slipped all counterchanegd. Motto Crains Dieu

== Notes ==
Church of England titles
Preceded by Thomas Gibson George Collins	Dean of Belfast; 1926 – 1927	Succeeded by William Shaw Kerr
