= Joseph Peacocke (bishop of Derry and Raphoe) =

Joseph Irvine Peacocke (28 November 1866 – 31 January 1962) was a long serving Bishop of Derry and Raphoe.

Born into an ecclesiastical family — his father was Joseph Peacocke, Archbishop of Dublin — on 28 November 1866 and educated at Trinity College, Dublin, he was ordained in 1891 and his first post was a curacy in Shankill, Belfast. In 1894 he became Rector of Christ Church, Lisburn. He then held further incumbencies in Dublin and Bangor before his appointment to the episcopate in 1916. He was elected to Derry and Raphoe on 15 March and consecrated 25 April 1916; he resigned 31 December 1944. He had become a Doctor of Divinity (DD).

His children included Cuthbert and Anthony.

Church of Ireland titles
Preceded by George Chadwick	Bishop of Derry and Raphoe; 1916–1945	Succeeded by Robert Boyd
