= James Mehaffey =

Irish Anglican prelate (1931–2020)

James Mehaffey (29 March 1931 – 6 January 2020) was Bishop of Derry and Raphoe of the Church of Ireland from 1980 to 2002.

== Early life and ministry ==
Born on 29 March 1931 and educated at Trinity College, Dublin he was ordained in 1955.

He began his clerical life with curacies at St Patrick's, Belfast and St John's, Deptford after which he was a minor canon at Down Cathedral. He was Bishop's Curate at St Christopher's, Belfast. He then served as the incumbent at Kilkeel and Cregagh before his elevation to the episcopate.

== Bishop of Derry and Raphoe ==
Mehaffey was elected Bishop of Derry and Raphoe on 27 June 1980 and consecrated on 7 September 1980. He worked very closely with his Catholic counterpart Bishop Edward Daly from his arrival in the city, organising joint carol services at Christmas, releasing joint statements at New Year and in the face of civic unrest. This collaborative ministry was recognised when both bishops were awarded the Freedom of the city of Derry in 2015.

Bishop Donal McKeown said at the time both bishops were "recognised for their enormous contribution to the common good and to the welfare of society at a difficult time when politicians weren’t even talking to each other.”

Mehaffey's presence at the funeral of Bishop Daly was widely reported and interpreted as a sign of the conviction and courage of both men.

Mehaffey retired on 31 January 2002, after serving as bishop for over twenty-one years.

James Mehaffey was married to Thelma; the couple had three children.

Church of Ireland titles
Preceded by Robin Eames	Bishop of Derry and Raphoe; 1980–2002	Succeeded by Ken Good
