= Charles Tyndall =

Charles John Tyndall DD (30 May 1900 – 3 April 1971) was the 13th Bishop of Kilmore, Elphin and Ardagh who was later translated to Derry and Raphoe.

Educated at The King's Hospital and Trinity College, Dublin and ordained in 1925, his first post was a curacy at Clontarf. He then held incumbencies at Enniscorthy and then the parish of Drumcondra and North Strand before being appointed Rural Dean of Fingal and then (his last post before elevation to the episcopate in 1956) Archdeacon of Elphin and Ardagh. While at Kilmore, Tyndall was elected Bishop of Derry and Raphoe on 14 October 1958 (his election was confirmed the same day); he resigned on 30 September 1969.

He was the uncle of John Tyndall, the former chairman of the National Front and founder of the British National Party.

Church of Ireland titles
| Preceded by Frederick Julian Mitchell | Bishop of Kilmore, Elphin and Ardagh; 1956–1958 | Succeeded by Edward Moore |
| Preceded by Robert McNeil Boyd | Bishop of Derry and Raphoe; 1958–1969 | Succeeded by Cuthbert Peacocke |
