= William Higgin =

Irish Anglican bishop

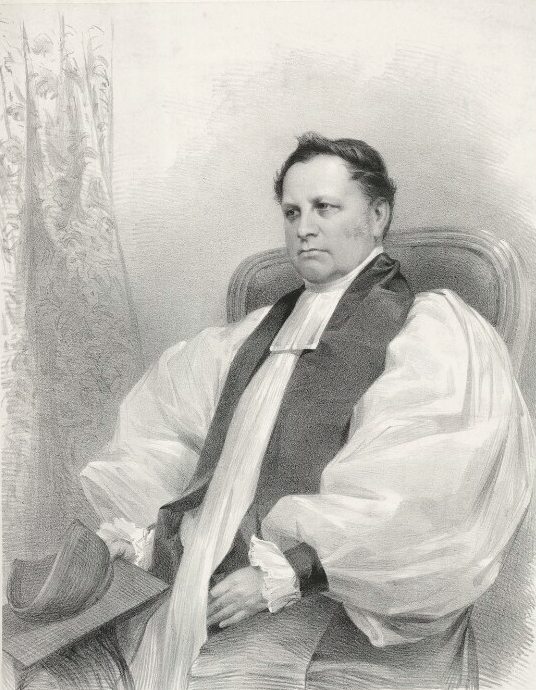
William Higgin, 1853 lithograph

William Higgin (1793 – 12 July 1867) was the 18th Bishop of Limerick, Ardfert and Aghadoe from 1849 until 1853, when he was translated to Derry and Raphoe.

== Life ==
Higgin was educated at Trinity College, Cambridge, graduating BA as 13th wrangler in 1813. He was the incumbent at Roscrea from 1828 to 1835 when he became Vicar general of Killaloe. In 1844 he became Dean of Limerick, his last post before elevation to the episcopate.

Higgin was nominated to Derry and Raphoe on 18 November 1853 and appointed there by letters patent dated 7 December 1853.

== Family ==
Higgin married in 1820 Mary Chippendall, daughter of Thomas Chippendall, of Blackburn. They had three sons and four daughters.

Church of Ireland titles
Preceded by Edmund Knox	Bishop of Limerick, Ardfert and Aghadoe; 1849–1853	Succeeded by Henry Griffin
Preceded by Richard Ponsonby	Bishop of Derry and Raphoe; 1853–1867	Succeeded by William Alexander
