= Dean of Belfast =

Church of Ireland official

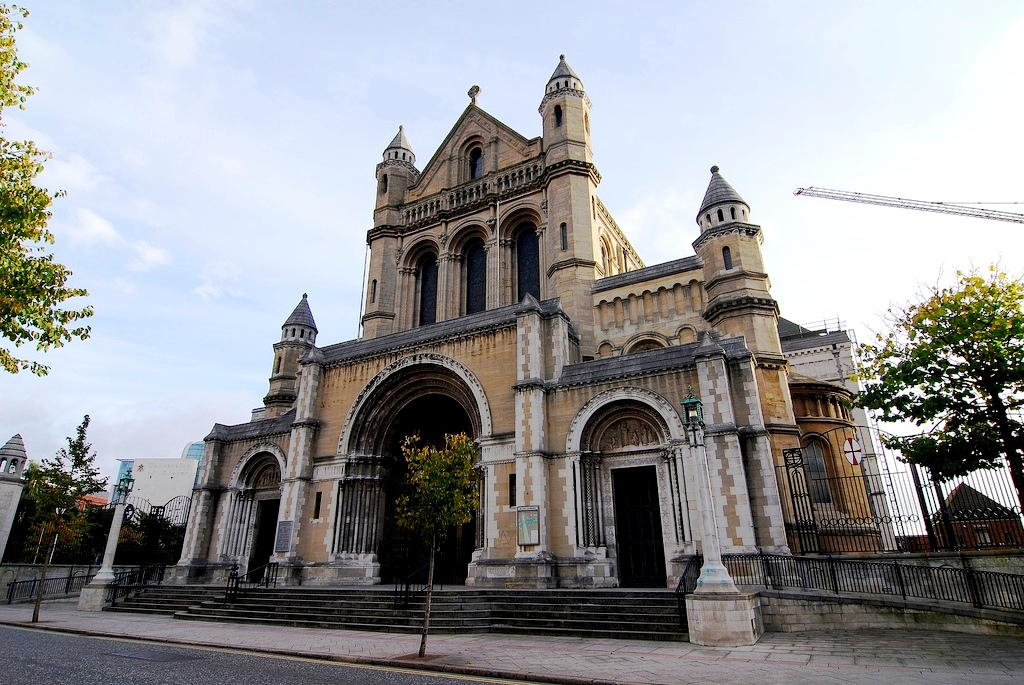
St Anne's Cathedral, Belfast

The Dean of Belfast is the senior official of St Anne's Cathedral in the city of Belfast, Northern Ireland and head of the Chapter, its governing body.

== List of deans of Belfast ==
- 1894–1899: Henry Stewart O’Hara; first dean of Belfast (afterwards Bishop of Cashel and Waterford, 1900)
- 1899–1903: Charles Frederick D’Arcy; became Bishop of Ossory, Ferns and Leighlin, and subsequently Bishop of Down, Connor and Dromore, briefly Archbishop of Dublin, and finally Archbishop of Armagh
- 1903–1911: John Joseph Robinson
- 1911–1919: Charles Thornton Primrose Grierson (afterwards Bishop of Down, Connor and Dromore, 1919)
- 1919–1926: Thomas Gibson George Collins (afterwards Bishop of Meath, 1926)
- 1926–1932: Henry Robert Brett
- 1932–1945: William Shaw Kerr
- 1945–1956: Robert Cyril Hamilton Glover Elliott (afterwards Bishop of Connor, 1956)
- 1956–1970: Cuthbert Peacocke (afterwards Bishop of Derry and Raphoe, 1970)
- 1970–1985: Samuel Bennett Crooks
- 1985–2001: Jack Shearer
- 2001–2011: Houston McKelvey
- 2011–2017: John Mann
- 2018–present: Stephen Forde
