= Cuthbert Peacocke =

Cuthbert Irvine Peacocke TD (26 April 1903 – 6 April 1994) was the 8th Bishop of Derry and Raphoe, retiring in 1975.

Peacocke was born at St Mary's Rectory, Dublin, son of Rt. Revd Joseph Irvine Peacocke, bishop of Derry and Raphoe 1916–1945. He was educated at Saint Columba's College, Dublin and Trinity College, Dublin, and ordained in 1927. His first post was a curacy at Seapatrick.

He graduated with a B.A. 1925, an M.A. 1929. He was ordained deacon in 1926 and was curate of Seapatrick (Dromore) in the period 1926–1930. Between 1930 and 1933, he was head of the Church of Ireland Southern Mission to Belfast, Ballymacarett (Down), the main shipyard parish of east Belfast at the time of the 1920s Depression. He subsequently became Rector of Derriaghy (Connor) 1933–1935; Rector of St Mark's Dundela, Belfast (Down) 1935–1956; Chaplain to the Forces 1939-1945 (serving with the 8th Belfast Heavy Anti-Aircraft Unit in France); private chaplain to the Bishop of Down and Dromore 1945–1956; Rural Dean of Holywood 1948–1950; Archdeacon of Down and Canon of Belfast 1950–1956; Dean and Vicar of Belfast 1956–1970. On 16 October, he was appointed by the electoral college as Bishop of Derry and Raphoe and enthroned in St Columb's Cathedral on 22 January 1970. He represented the third generation of his family to the episcopate.

Peacocke was elected Bishop of Derry and Raphoe on 16 October 1969 and consecrated 6 January 1970. He resigned 31 March 1975.

Church of Ireland titles
Preceded by Cyril Elliott	Dean of Belfast; 1956–1969	Succeeded by Samuel Crooks
Preceded by Charles Tyndall	Bishop of Derry and Raphoe; 1970–1975	Succeeded by Robin Eames
