= St Anne's Cathedral, Belfast =

Anglican Cathedral in Belfast, Northern Ireland

Belfast Cathedral
- The Cathedral Church of St. Anne, Belfast
- Belfast Cathedral
- 54°36′10″N 05°55′42″W
- Country: Northern Ireland
- Denomination: Church of Ireland
- Churchmanship: High Church
- Website: www.belfastcathedral.org

History
- Dedication: St Anne

Architecture
- Functional status: Church Services
- Architect: Sir Thomas Drew
- Style: Roman
- Groundbreaking: 1899
- Completed: 1904

Specifications
- Capacity: 800

Administration
- Province: Province of Armagh
- Diocese: Diocese of Connor

Clergy
- Archbishop: The Most Right Revd John McDowell
- Bishop(s): Bishop of Connor; Bishop of Down and Dromore
- Vicar: The Revd Julie Bell
- Dean: The Very Revd Stephen Forde

St Anne's Cathedral is a Romanesque-style Anglican cathedral in Donegall Street, Belfast, Northern Ireland. It is unusual in serving two separate dioceses (Connor and Down and Dromore). It is the focal point of Belfast's Cathedral Quarter.

== History ==
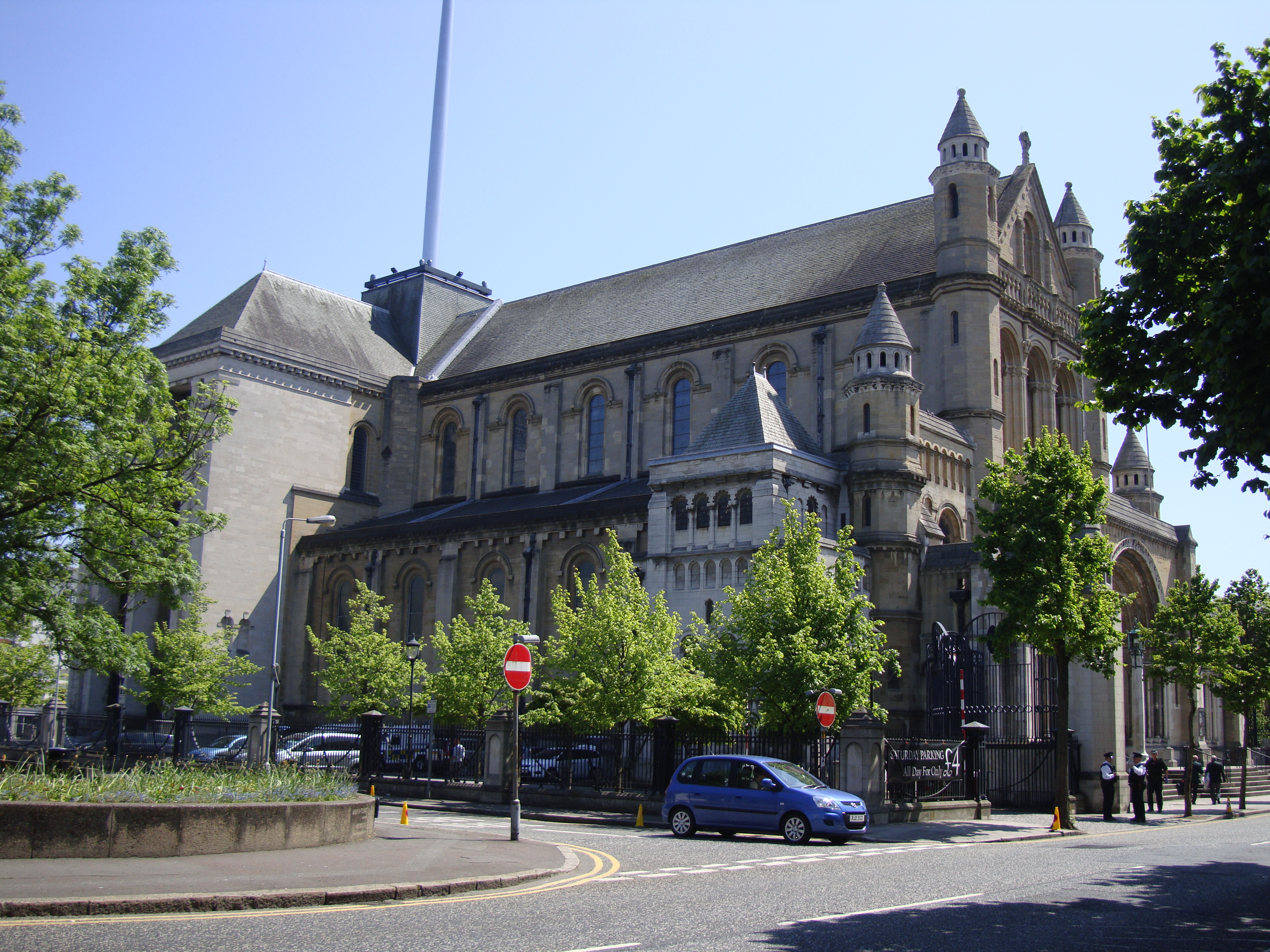
St Anne's Cathedral from the northwest

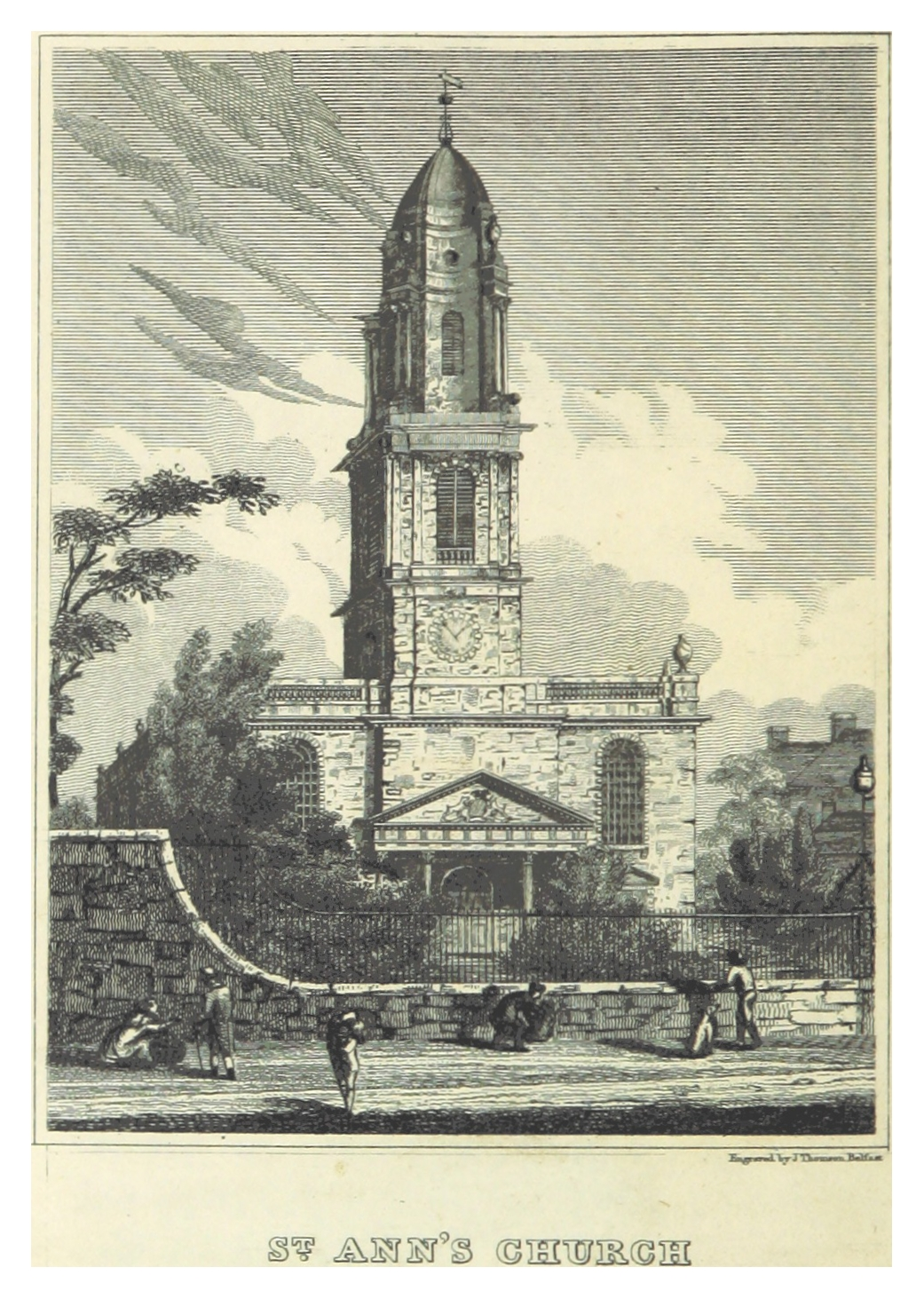
St Anne's Church, which preceded the cathedral

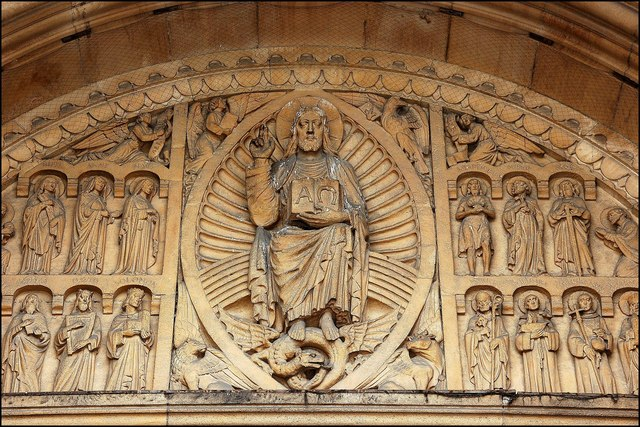
Detail above entrance

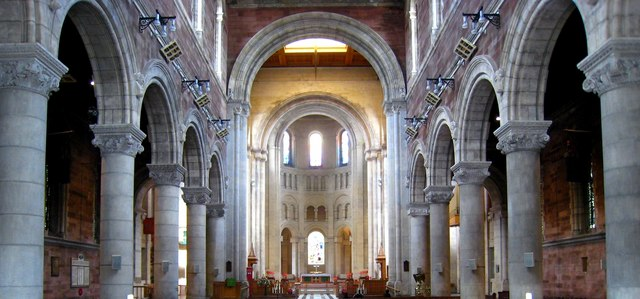
Interior

The first architect was Sir Thomas Drew, the foundation stone being laid on 6 September 1899 by the Countess of Shaftesbury. The old parish church of St Anne by Francis Hiorne of 1776 had continued in use, up until 31 December 1903, while the new cathedral was constructed around it; the old church was then demolished. The Good Samaritan window, to be seen in the sanctuary, is the only feature of the old church to be retained in the cathedral. Initially, only the nave of the cathedral was built, and this was consecrated on 2 June 1904.

In 1924 it was decided to build the west front of the cathedral as a memorial to the Ulstermen and women who had served and died in the Great War. The foundation stone for this was laid by the 3rd Duke of Abercorn, Governor of Northern Ireland, on 2 June 1925 and the completed facade, to an amended design by the architect Sir Charles Archibald Nicholson, was dedicated in June 1927.

In the meantime, the central crossing, in which the choir sits, was built between 1922 and 1924. The Baptistery, to plans drawn up by the late W.H. Lynn, who had assisted Sir Thomas Drew, was dedicated in 1928, and the Chapel of the Holy Spirit, with its beautiful mosaics depicting Saint Patrick, was dedicated on 5 July 1932, the 1500th anniversary of the arrival of St Patrick in Ireland.

Edward, Lord Carson, the leader of the Unionist cause at the time of the Home Rule Crisis, was buried (with a state funeral) in the south aisle of the cathedral in 1935. In 1941 the cathedral was almost destroyed by a German bomb, which caused extensive damage to surrounding properties. In 1955 work began on the construction of the ambulatory, at the east end of the cathedral. This work was dedicated in 1959, but it was not for another ten years that it was possible to begin work on the north and south transepts. The Troubles and inflation led to long delays and major problems with the financing of this work.

The south transept, containing the Chapel of Unity, and with the organ loft above, was dedicated in 1974, and the north transept, with the large Celtic cross designed by John MacGeagh on the exterior, and housing the Chapel of the Royal Irish Rifles, was completed in 1981.

In April 2007 a 40-metre stainless steel spire was installed on top of the cathedral. Named the "Spire of Hope", the structure is illuminated at night and is part of a wider redevelopment planned for the Cathedral Quarter. The base section of the spire protrudes through a glass platform in the cathedral's roof directly above the choir stalls, allowing visitors to view it from the nave.

== Annual charity ==
In 1976, the Dean of Belfast, Samuel B. Crooks, started his annual Christmas 'Sit Out', spending the week leading up to Christmas on the steps of the cathedral, accepting donations large and small from passers-by, which were then distributed amongst many local charities. Dean Crooks soon became known as the "Black Santa", because of the outfit he wore to keep warm. The tradition has been continued by his successors. The week before Christmas each year, the Dean (currently Stephen Forde) and members of the cathedral chapter sit outside the cathedral from 9 a.m. until 5.30 p.m. each day to raise money for charity and are still collectively known as the 'Black Santa'. The tradition has raised several million pounds for charity.

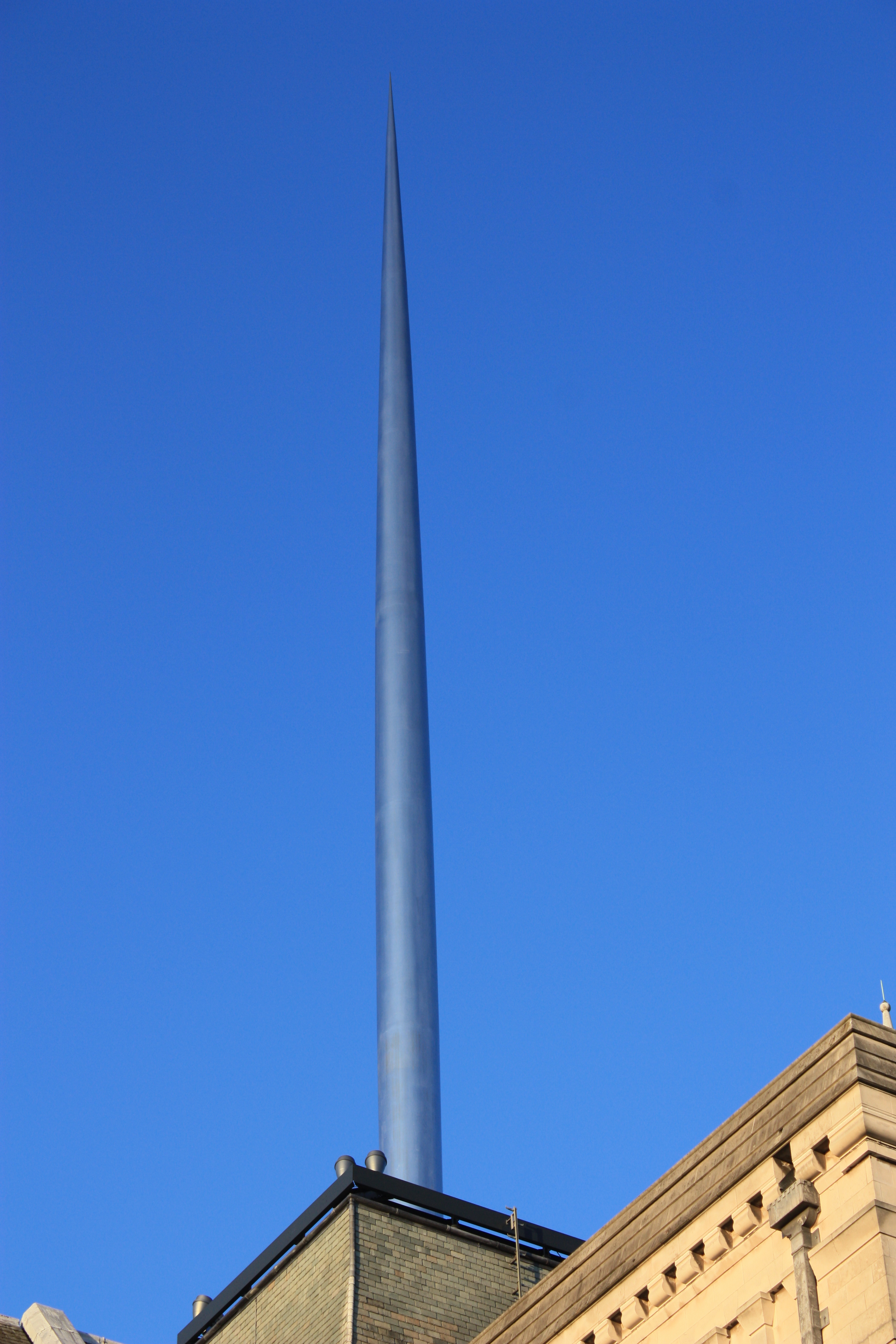
St Anne's Cathedral Spire, December 2009

== Cathedral worship ==
Services are held every day in the cathedral. Lunchtime prayers are said at 1:00 pm on Mondays, Tuesdays and Wednesdays, with Holy Communion celebrated at 1:00 pm on Thursdays, saints' days and other holy days. A service of healing takes place in the Cathedral Hall or Chapel of Unity every Friday at 1:00 pm. A service of choral evensong is held at 5:30 pm every Friday. On Sundays, a service of said or sung eucharist is celebrated at 11 am, with a service of evening prayer or evensong at 3:30 pm. During Lent, lunch time Eucharist replaces lunchtime prayers; Monday to Wednesday in the Chapel of the Holy Spirit, Thursday in the Chapel of Unity.

== Organ ==
The cathedral's organ with four manuals is the second largest pipe-organ in Northern Ireland. It was built by Harrison and Harrison in 1907 and rebuilt in 1969–1975. A specification of the organ can be found on the National Pipe Organ Register.

=== List of organists ===
- William Ware 1776–1825
- John Willis 1825–1847
- James Thompson May 1847–1862
- Henry A Wood 1863–1873
- Isaac Waugh Nicholl 1874–1903
- Charles J Brennan 1904–1964 (first organist of St Anne's Cathedral)
- Harry Grindle 1964–1976 (formerly organist of St. Comgall's Church, Bangor, County Down)
- Jonathan Gregory 1976–1984 (later organist of Leicester Cathedral)
- Andrew Paul Padmore 1984–1988 (formerly organist of Saint Finbarre's Cathedral)
- David Drinkell 1988–2002 (formerly organist of St. Magnus Cathedral Kirkwall)
- Brian Hunter 2002–2003
- Philip Stopford 2003–2010 (formerly assistant organist of Chester Cathedral)
- Ian Barber 2010–2012
- David Stevens 2012–2019 (formerly director of the girls' choir and sub-organist at Newcastle Cathedral)
- Matthew Owens 2019–2022 (formerly organist and master of the choristers at Wells Cathedral)
- Jack Wilson 2023– (formerly graduate organ scholar at Ely Cathedral, and assistant director of music at Belfast Cathedral)

== Gallery ==
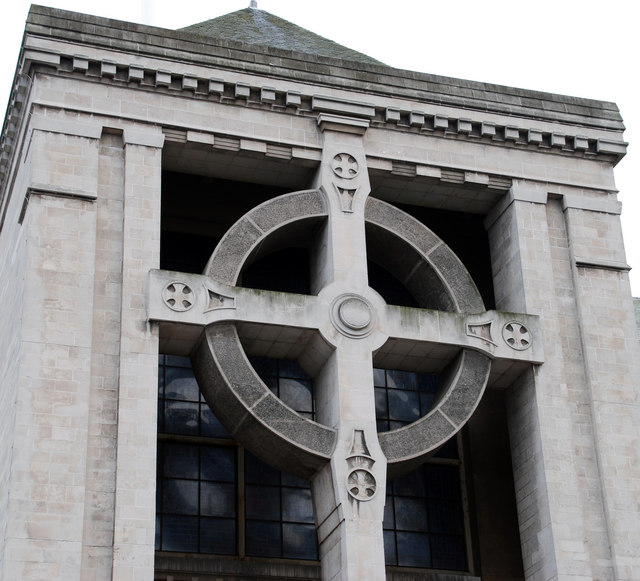
Celtic cross

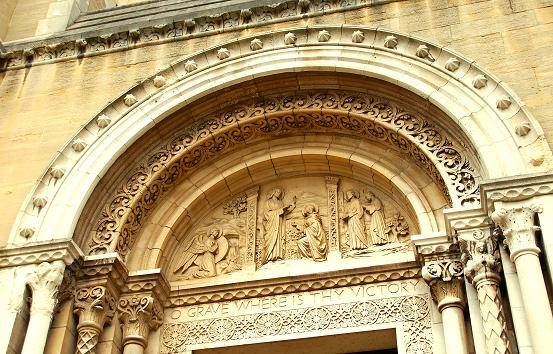
The Resurrection

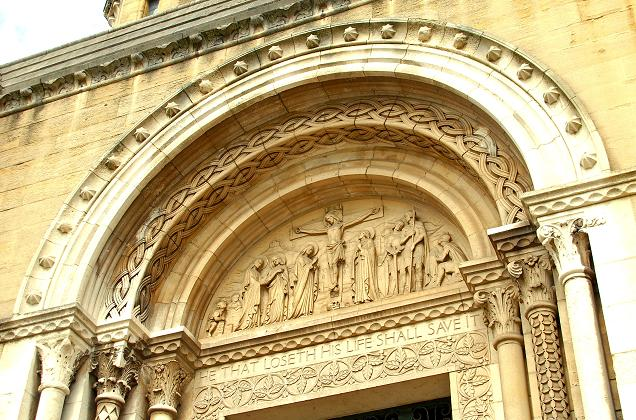
The Crucifixion

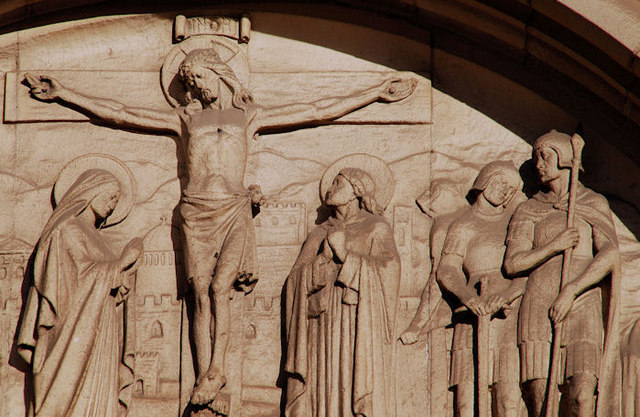
The Crucifixion close up

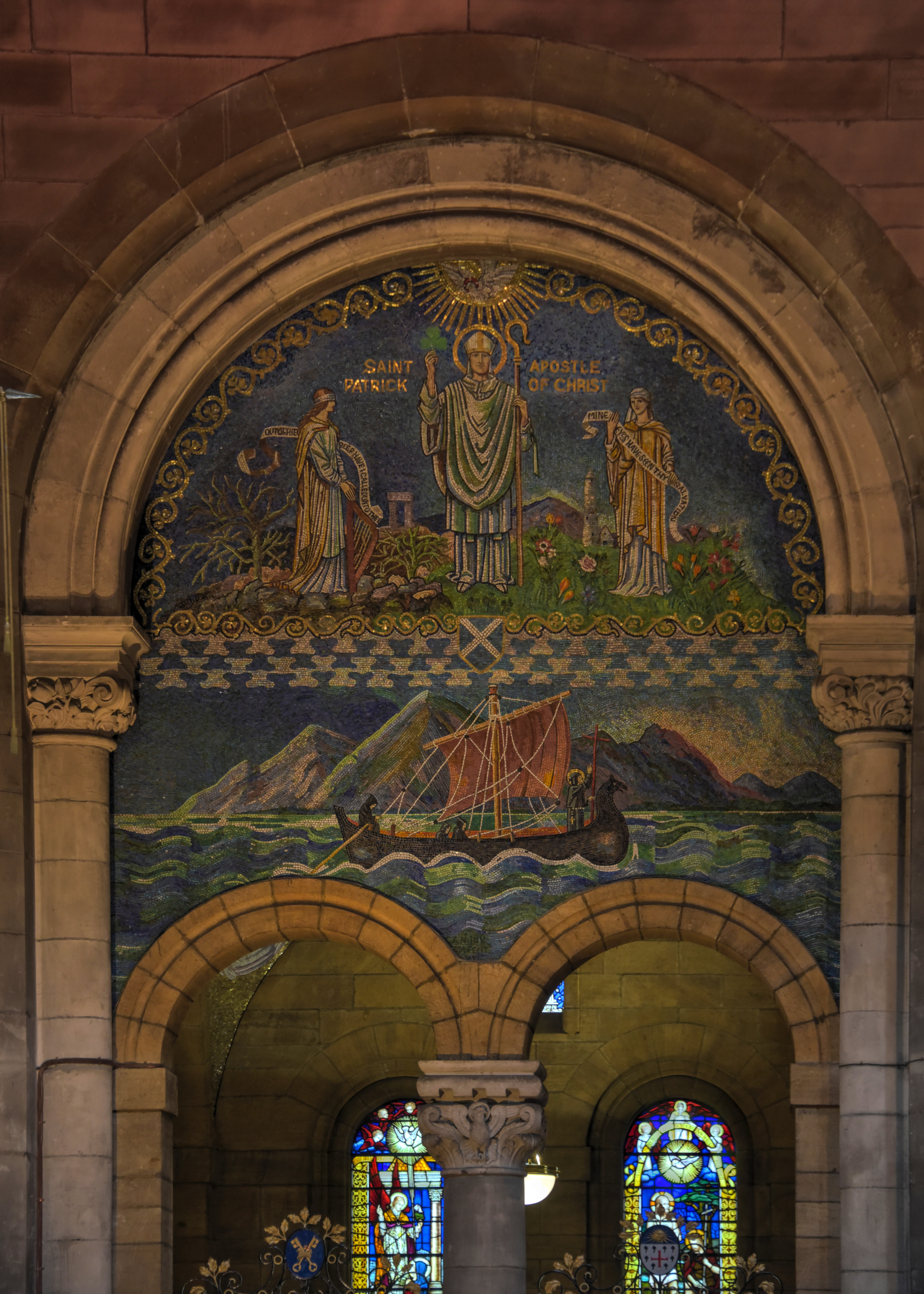
Chapel of the Holy Spirit mosaic

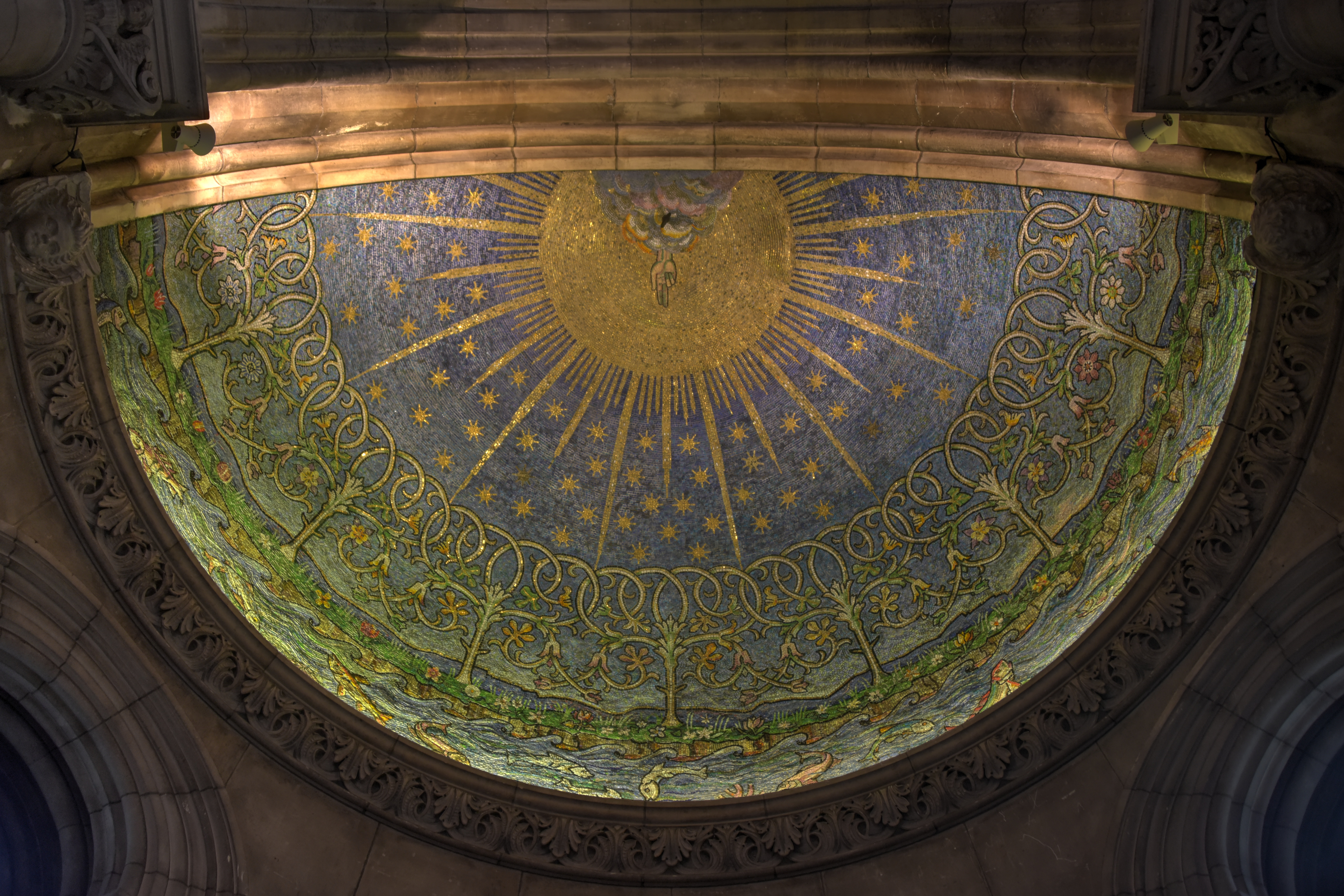
The baptistery ceiling

Science pillar

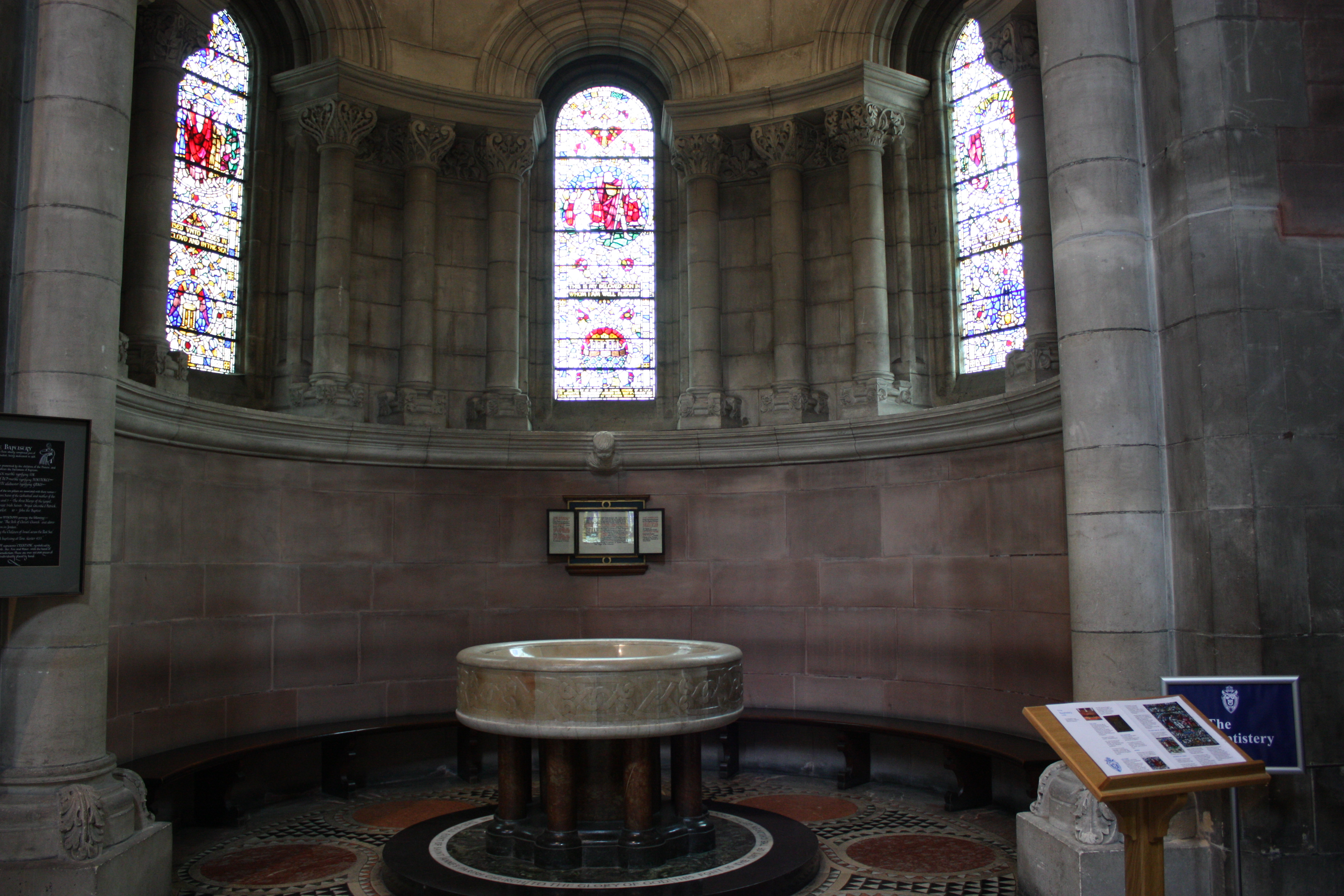
The baptistery

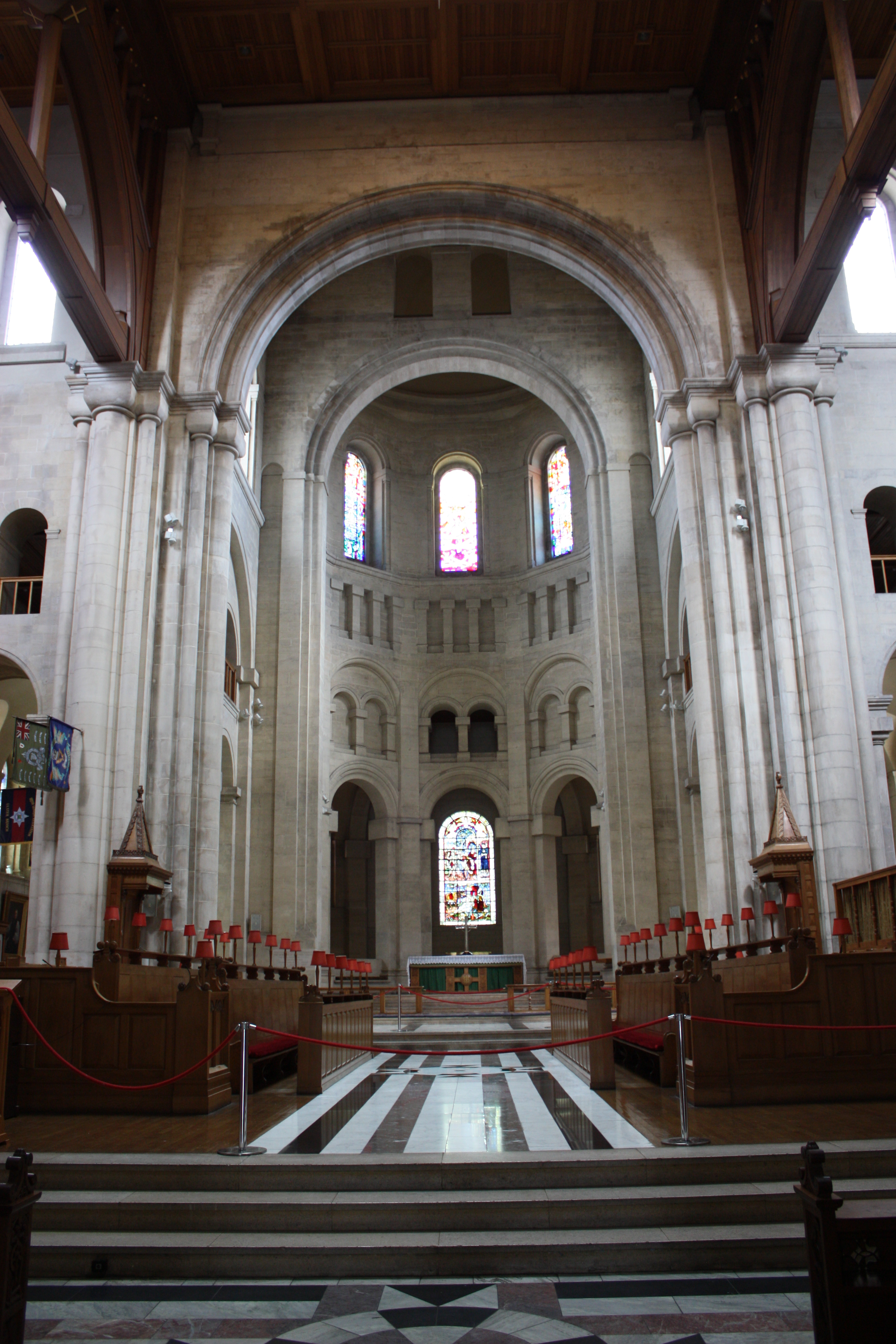
Towards the chancel

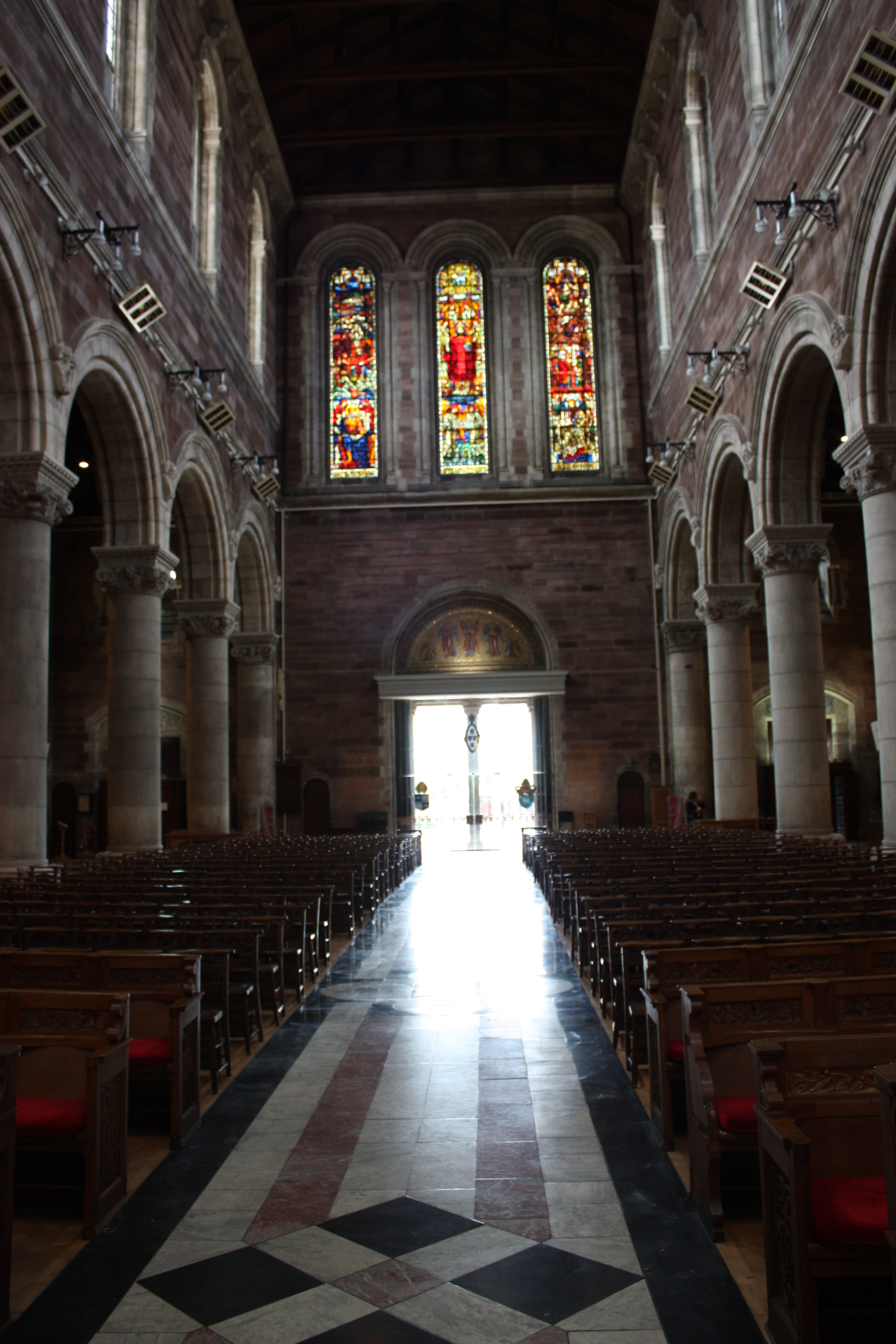
The nave

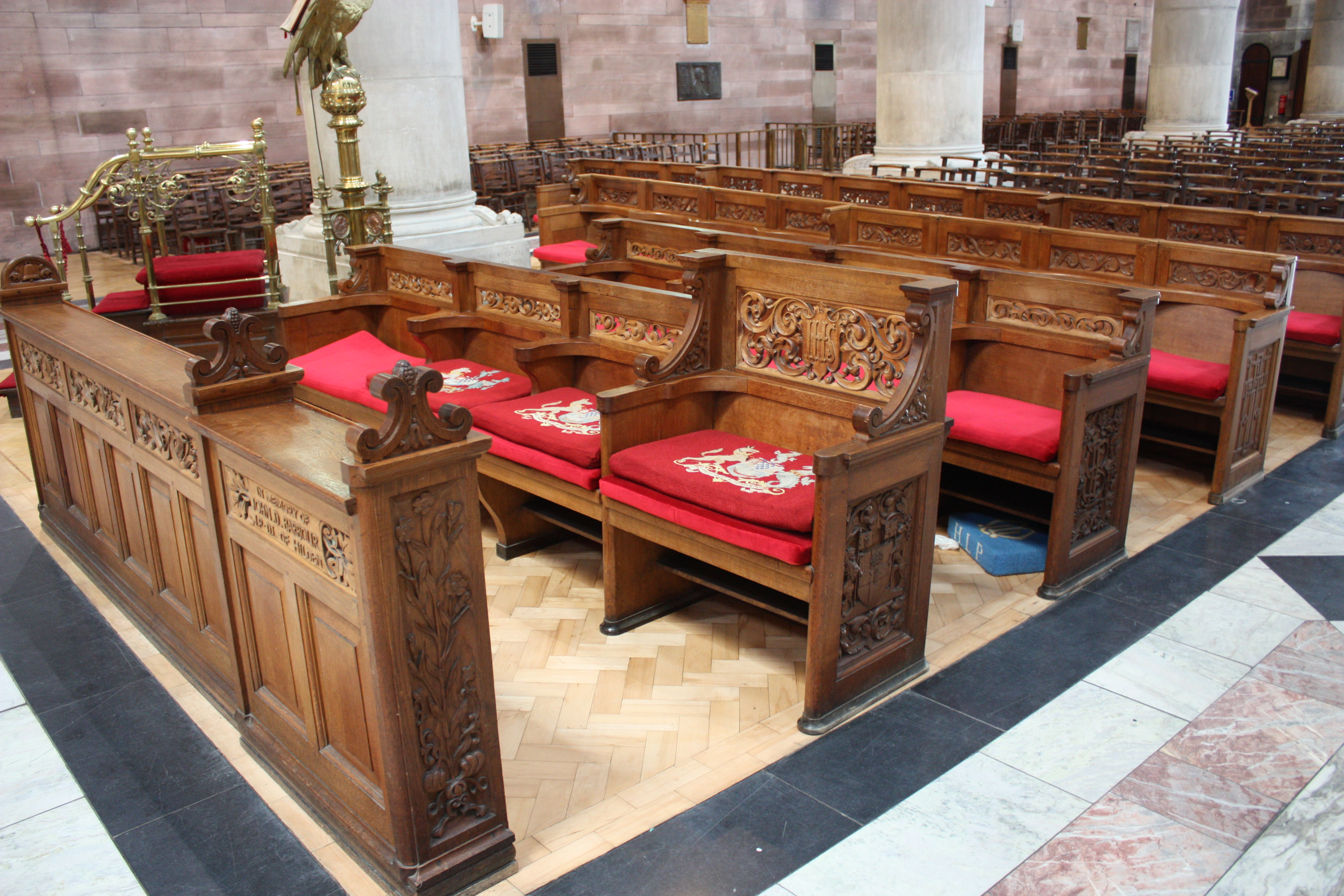
Royal pew

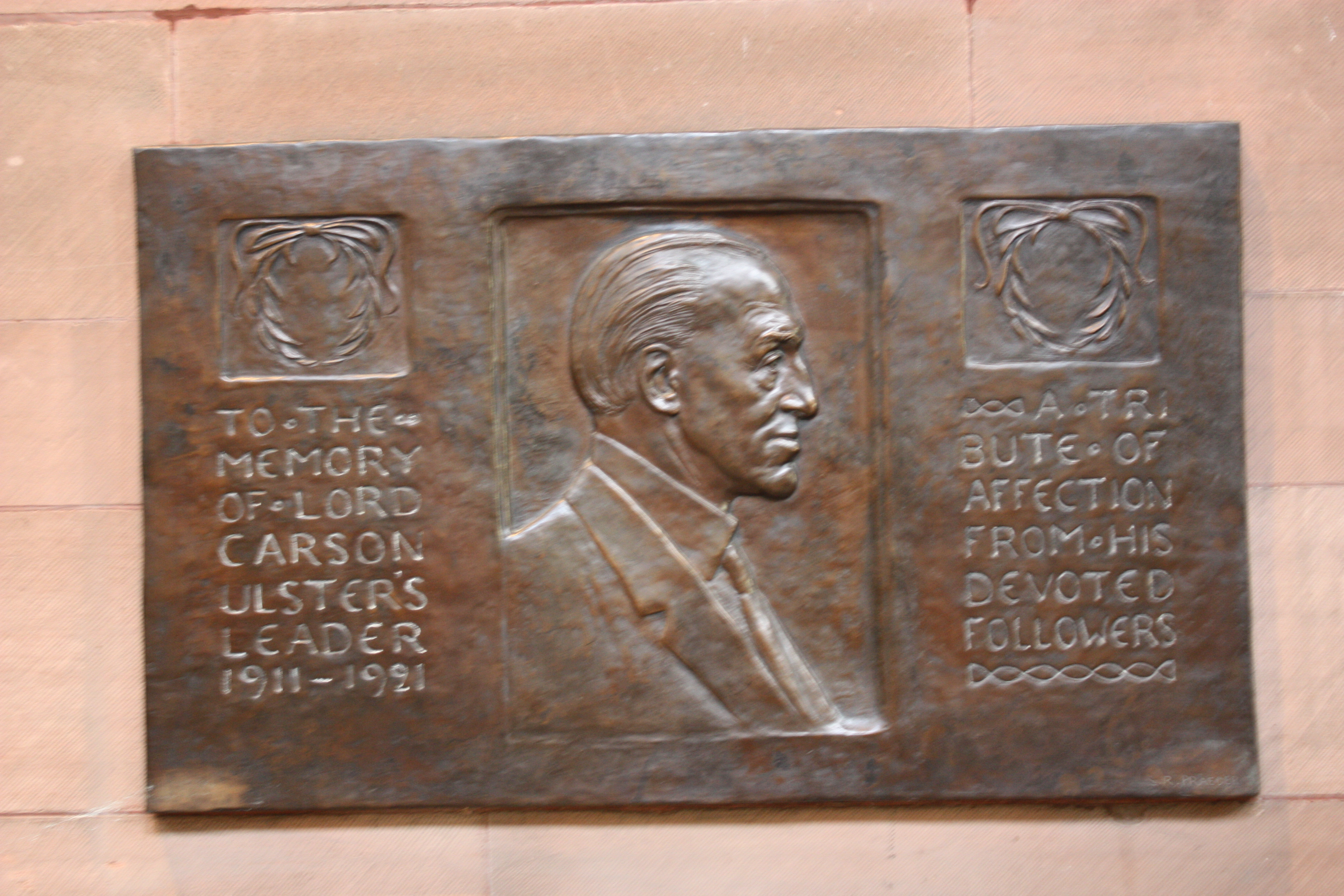
Edward Carson memorial

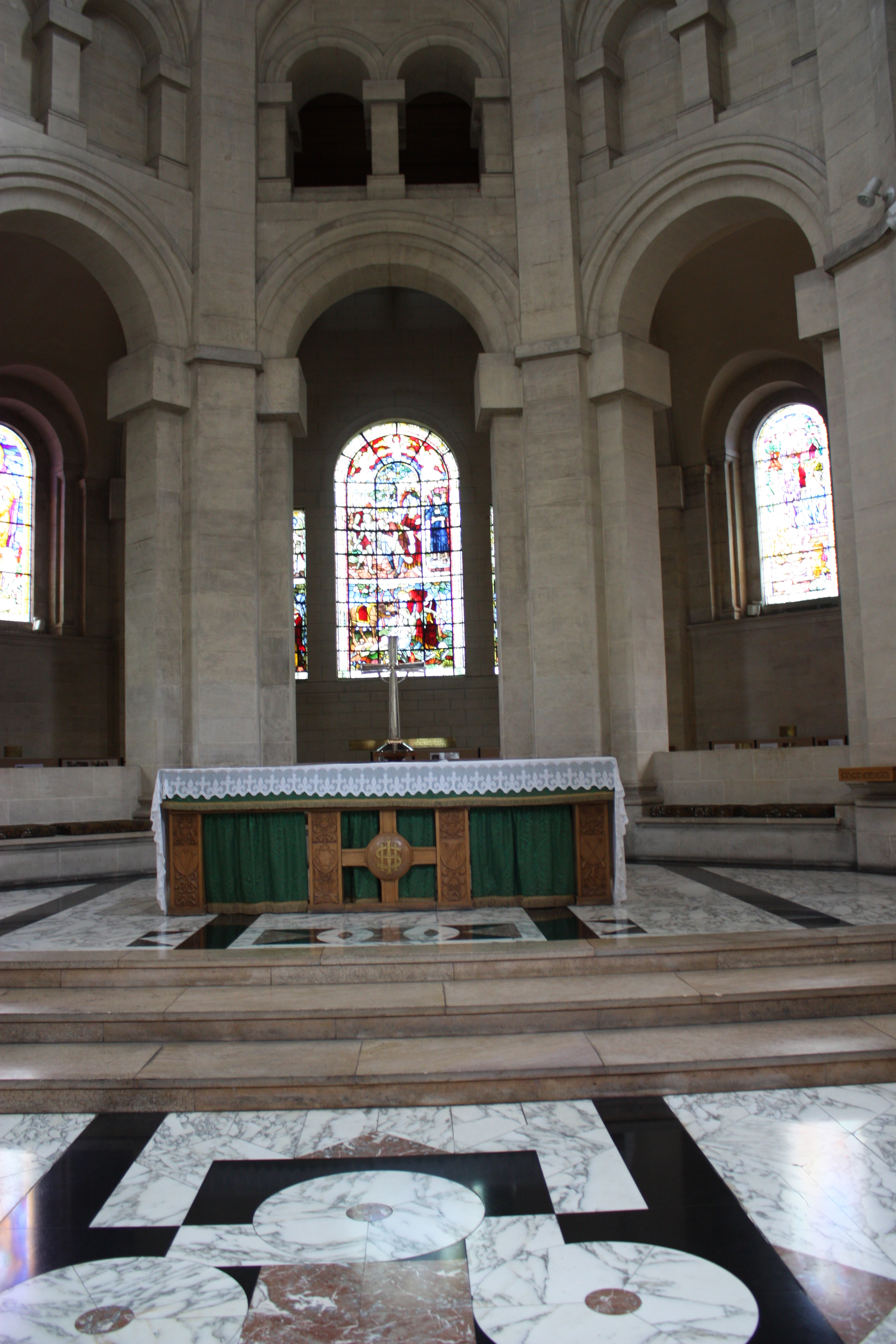
Altar

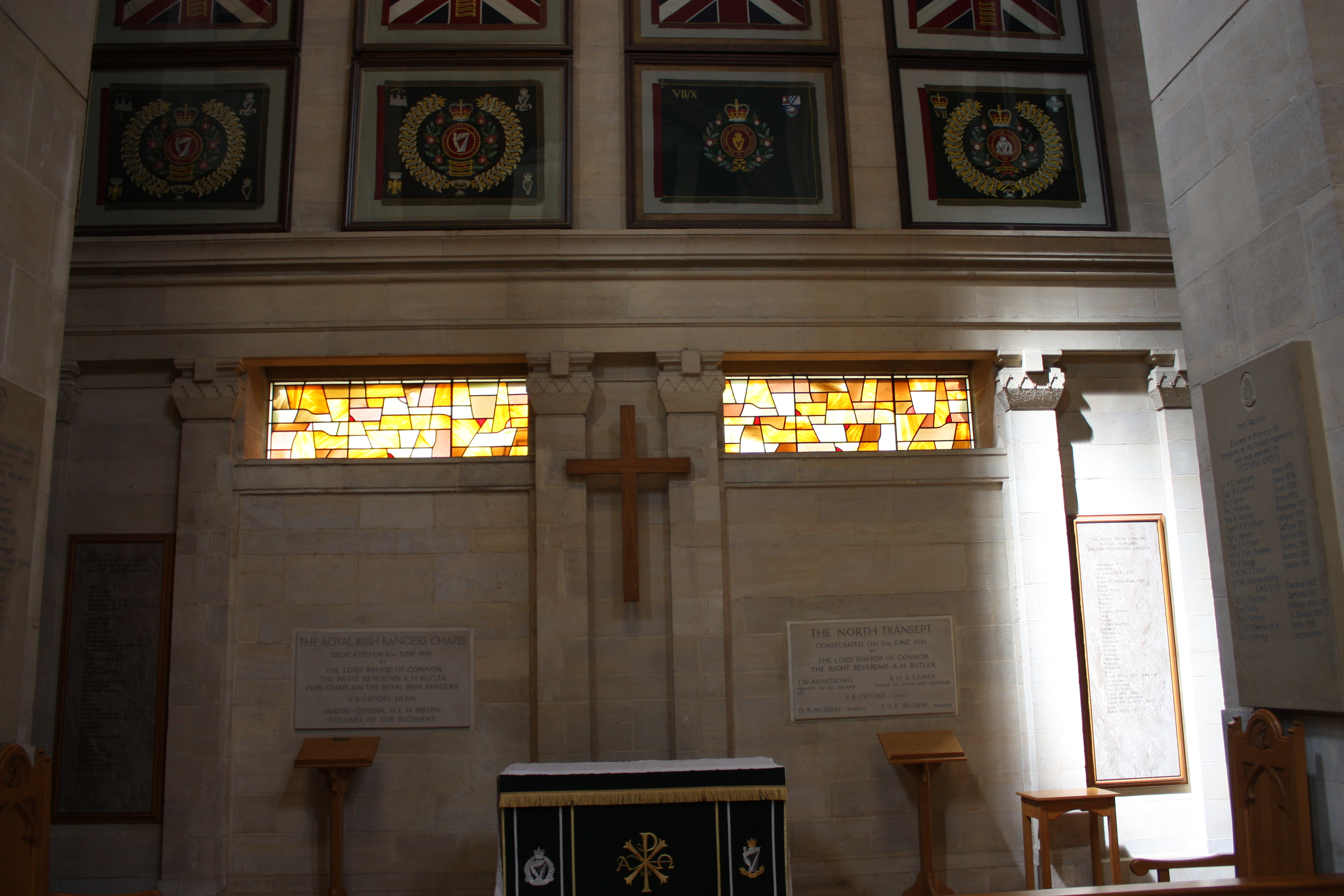
Military memorials

== See also ==
- Dean of Belfast – chronological list of the Deans of St Anne's
