= Andrew Forster =

Andrew James Forster is an Irish Church of Ireland Bishop. He is currently Serving as Bishop of Derry and Raphoe since 8 December 2019.

Forster was educated at Queen's University, Belfast and the Church of Ireland Theological College. He was ordained in 1992. His first post was a curacy at Willowfield. After that he was Dean of Residence at his old university then from 2002 to 2007 he was Archdeacon of Elphin and Ardagh and rector of the Drumcliff group of parishes in County Sligo. From 2007 to 2015 he had Served as rector of Drumglass. He previously served as Archdeacon of Ardboe from 2015 to 2019 when he was ordained a bishop.

On 29 August 2019, Forster was elected as Bishop of Derry & Raphoe, following the retirement of Bishop Kenneth Good In 31 May 2019. His consecration took place on the evening of Sunday 8 December in St Patrick's Cathedral, Armagh. He was enthroned in the two diocesan cathedrals in Derry and Raphoe at the beginning of January 2020.

Forster was President of the Irish Council of Churches, his term of office ran from March 2022 until March 2024. He was succeeded by Bishop Sarah Groves.

He is married to Heather and has three children, Hannah, Patrick & Megan (in age order).
