= Maurice Day (dean of Waterford) =

Irish Anglican priest

Maurice William Day (23 April 1858 – 29 August 1916) was an Irish Anglican priest in the late 19th and early 20th centuries.

He was the son of a clergyman (His father was Bishop of Cashel, Emly, Waterford and Lismore from 1872 until 1899); and was educated at Repton School and Trinity College, Dublin. Ordained in 1882, after curacies at Queenstown and Waterford he held incumbencies at Newport, County Tipperary and then Kilbrogan, County Cork. In 1887 he married Katherine Louisa Frances Garfitt: they had one daughter and four sons, two of which were killed in the First World War, Lieut Maurice Charles Day(1891-1914) in East Africa and Capt. John Edward Day (1894 - 1917) in Flanders. 1900 he became Chaplain to the Bishop of Cashel and Waterford. From 1908 to 1913 he was Dean of Cashel; and, from 1913 to 1916, Dean of Waterford. On 29 August 1916 he died, aged 58, in Courtmacsherry, County Cork.

Church of Ireland titles
Preceded by George Purcell White	Dean of Cashel; 1908–1913	Succeeded by Robert Devenish
Preceded by Henry Monck Mason Hackett	Dean of Waterford; 1913–1916	Succeeded by Robert Miller
