= James Butson =

Irish Anglican priest

The Ven. James Strange Butson (10 February 1778 – 29 January 1845) was an Irish Anglican priest.

Butson was the son of Bishop Christopher Butson. He was educated at Winchester College and New College, Oxford. He was the Prebendary of Kilconnell in Clonfert Cathedral from 1809 until 1812; and Archdeacon of Clonfert from 1812 until his death.

His son was himself Archdeacon of Clonfert, then Dean of Kilmacduagh.
