= Anthony Kirwan (priest) =

Irish Anglican priest

Anthony La Touche Kirwan was an Irish Anglican priest.

He was born into an ecclesiastical family, the son of the Walter Blake Kirwan, Dean of Killala from 1800 to 1805 and educated at Trinity College, Dublin.

He was Dean of Kilmacduagh from 1839 to 1849; and then of Limerick from then until his death on 13 July 1868.

He married Susan, the daughter of William Blacker, of Woodbrook, Wexford. Two of their daughters married Thomas William Anderson of Gracedieu, Co. Waterford.

== Notes ==
Church of Ireland titles
Preceded by John Thomas O'Neil	Dean of Kilmacduagh; 1839–1949	Succeeded by Joseph Aldrich Bermingham
Preceded by William Higgin	Dean of Limerick; 1849–1868	Succeeded by Maurice Fitzgerald Day
