= Butson =

Butson is a surname. Notable people with the surname include:

- Christopher Butson, Church of Ireland bishop
- Christopher Butson (priest), Irish Anglican priest
- Matthew Butson, New Zealand Paralympic alpine skier
- Richard Butson, Canadian surgeon

== See also ==
- Butson Ridge, a ridge of Antarctica
- Butson-type Hadamard matrix
