= Kilmacduagh monastery =

House of Augustinian canons

Kilmacduagh Monastery
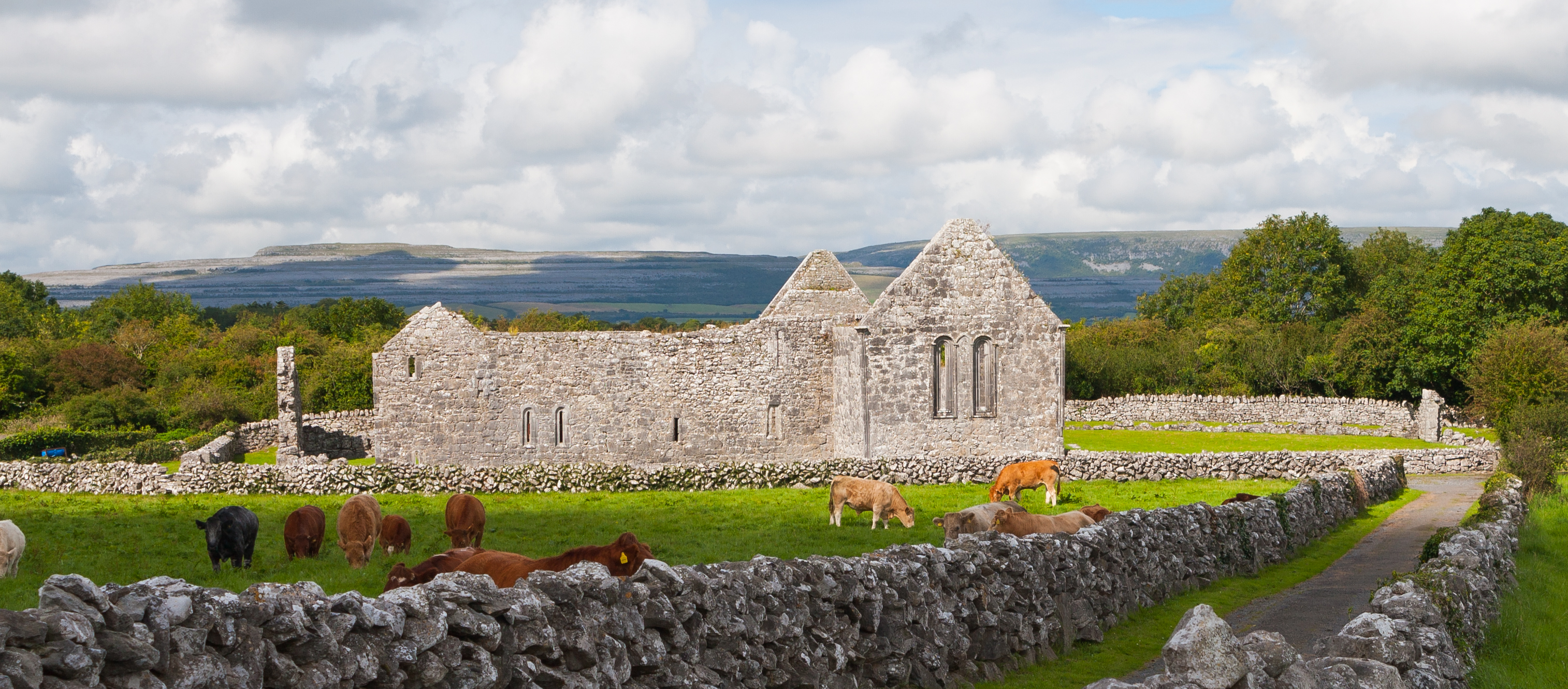
- Augustinian Abbey of St. Mary de Petra, erected in the 13th century

- Location within Ireland
- Interactive map of Kilmacduagh Monastery

Monastery information
- Established: 7th century
- Diocese: Kilmacduagh

People
- Founder: reportedly Colman MacDuagh

Architecture
- Status: ruined
- Heritage designation: National Monument No. 51
- Groundbreaking: original structures 7th century

Site
- Location: near Gort, County Galway, Ireland
- Coordinates: 53°02′58″N 8°53′15″W
- Public access: yes

Kilmacduagh Monastery is a ruined abbey near the town of Gort in County Galway, Ireland. It was the birthplace of the Diocese of Kilmacduagh. It was reportedly founded by Saint Colman, son of Duagh in the 7th century, on land given him by his cousin King Guaire Aidne mac Colmáin of Connacht.

== Location and name ==
Kilmacduagh Monastery is located in Kilmacduagh, a village of the same name, about 5 km from the town of Gort.

The name of the place translates as "church of Duagh's son". It was reportedly the 7th century Saint Colman, son of Duagh who established a monastery here on land given to him by his cousin King Guaire Aidne mac Colmáin of Connacht, who had a fortified dwelling near what is today Dunguaire Castle.

== History ==
As with most dates from this period, the year in which the monastery was founded is somewhat uncertain, but apparently the early 7th century is deemed the most likely.

Colman was abbot/bishop at the monastery until his death. Of his successors, only one appears in the annals by name, one Indrect (died 814), before the arrival of the English.

This site was of such importance in medieval times that it became the centre of a new diocese, or bishop's seat, the Diocese of Kilmacduagh, in the 12th century.

The early monastery was victim of multiple raids and finally ruined by William de Burgh in the early 13th century. To replace it, the local lord Owen O'Heyne (died 1253) founded the abbey of St. Mary de Petra as house for the Augustinian canons. The abbey is also attributed to Bishop Maurice Ileyan (died 1283) but the architectural evidence, according to Harold Leask, allows only the later added east range of the abbey to be associated with bishop Maurice. During the reformation this was granted to the Earl of Clanricarde.

The round tower was repaired in 1879 under the supervision of Sir Thomas Deane, with financial support from Sir William Henry Gregory of Coole Park.

The Diocese of Kilmacduagh is now incorporated into the United Dioceses of Tuam and Limerick in the Church of Ireland and in the Roman Catholic divisions, into the Diocese of Galway.

== Architecture ==
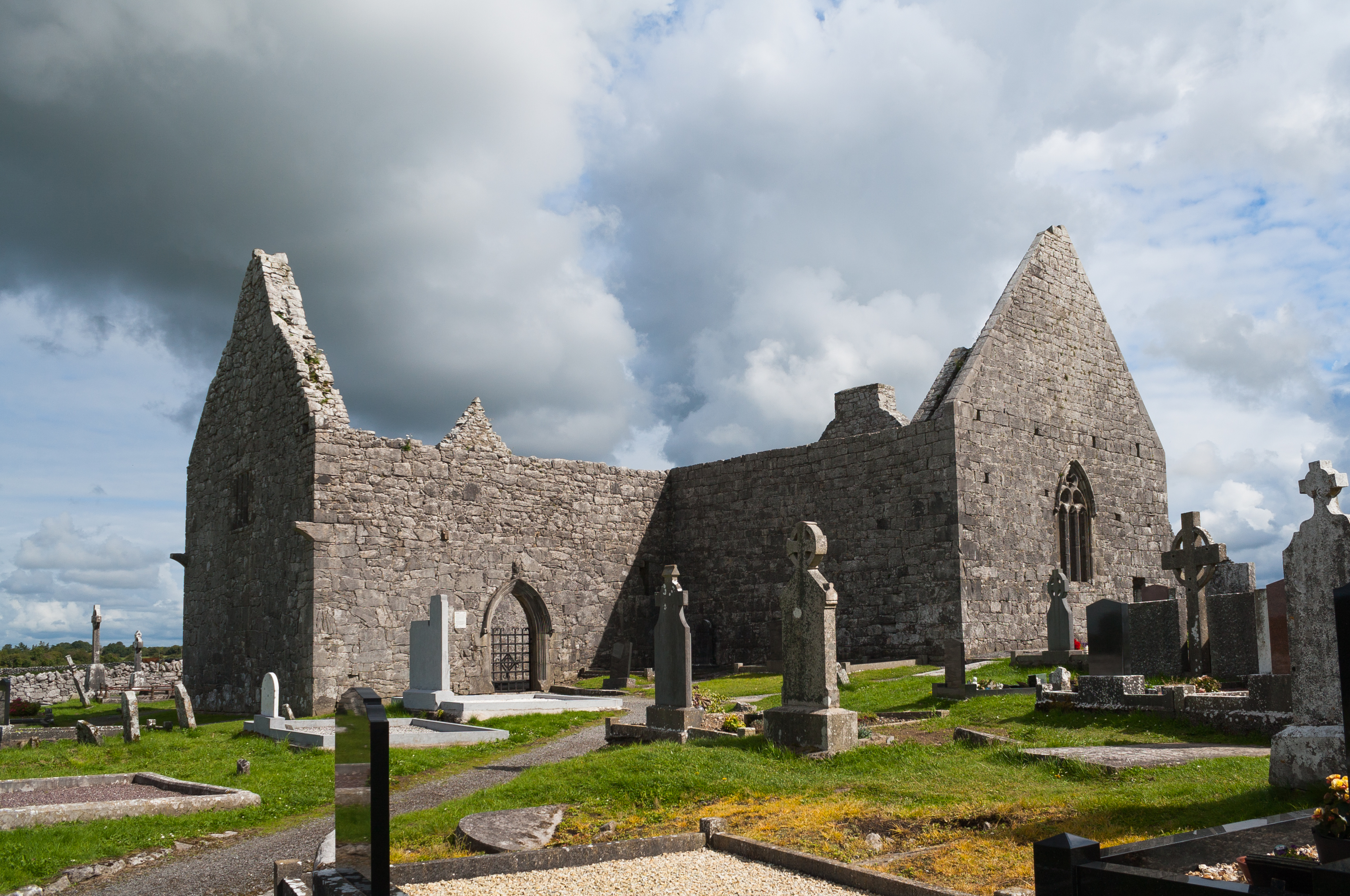
Cathedral

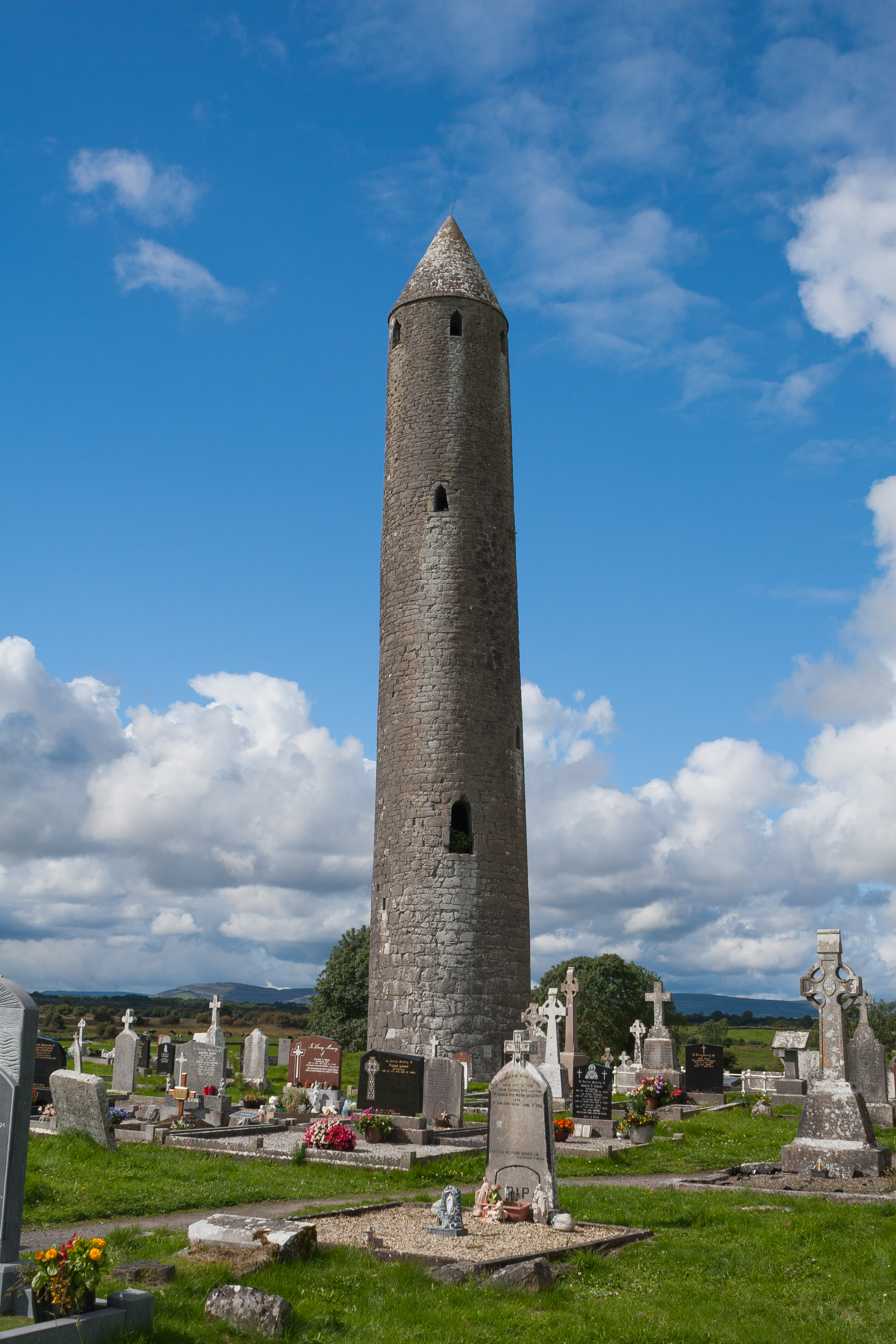
Kilmacduagh round tower: at 32.5 m (107 ft) it was the tallest pre-modern construction in Ireland.

The ruins of the monastery are sometimes referred to as "the seven churches". However, not all of these buildings were actually churches, none of them dates back to the 7th century. The buildings are:

- The abbey church, former cathedral, or Teampuil Mor, in the graveyard
- The "Church of Mary" or Teampuil Muire (also known as "The Lady's Church"), east of the road
- The "Church of St. John the Baptist" or Teampuil Eoin Baiste, to the north of the graveyard
- The "Abbot's House" or Seanclogh, further north, close to the road
- Teampuil Beg Mac Duagh, south of the graveyard
- The "Monastery Church" or "O'Heyne's Church" (or "O'Heyne's Abbey"), ca. 180 m (590 ft) north-east of the graveyard (13th century)
- The round tower, roughly 15 m (49 ft) south-west of the cathedral

The Kilmacduagh round tower is notable both for being well-preserved but also because of its heavy lean, over half a metre from the vertical. The tower is over 30 metres (98 feet 5 inches) tall, according to measurements taken in 1879, with the only doorway some 7 m (23 ft) above ground level. The tower probably dates from the 10th century.

== Legends ==
According to legend, Saint Colman MacDuagh was walking through the woods of the Burren when his girdle fell to the ground. Taking this as a sign, he built his monastery on that spot. The girdle was said to be studded with gems and was held by the O'Shaughnessys centuries later, along with St. Colman's crozier. The girdle was later lost.

It is said that, in the Diocese of Kilmacduagh, no man will ever die from a lightning strike.

== Deans ==
The Dean of Kilmacduagh was the priest in charge of the cathedral at Kilmacduagh monastery. Notable former deans included:

- 1662–1697: Dudley Persse
- 1697–1719: Stephen Handcock (also Dean of Clonmacnoise)
- 1719–1730: Charles Northcott
- 1730–1747: John Richardson
- 1748–1753: James Stopford (afterwards Bishop of Cloyne, 1753)
- 1753–1771: William Nethercoat
- 1803–1804: Ussher Lee (afterwards Dean of Waterford, 1804)
- 1804–1806: Richard Bagwell (afterwards Dean of Clogher, 1806)
- 1823–1836: Richard Hood
- 1837–1838: John Thomas O'Neil
- 1839–1849: Anthony La Touche Kirwan (afterwards Dean of Limerick, 1849)
- 1849–1874: Joseph Aldrich Bermingham
- 1874–1892: Christopher Henry Gould Butson

== See also ==
- Bishop of Kilmacduagh (Pre- and Post-Reformation)
- Bishop of Kilmacduagh and Kilfenora (Roman Catholic)
- Bishop of Clonfert and Kilmacduagh (Church of Ireland)
- List of abbeys and priories in Ireland (County Galway)
- List of tallest structures built before the 20th century

== Annalistic references ==
- 814. Innreachtach, Bishop of Cill Mic Duach;
- 846. Colman, son of Donncothaigh, successor of Colman, of Cill Mic Duach, died.
- M1199.10. John de Courcy, with the English of Ulidia, and the son of Hugo De Lacy, with the English of Meath, marched to 'Kilmacduagh to assist Cathal Crovderg O'Conor. Cathal Carragh, accompanied by the Connacians, came, and gave them battle: and the English of Ulidia and Meath were defeated with such slaughter that, of their five battalions, only two survived; and these were pursued from the field of battle to Rindown on Lough Ree, in which place John was completely hemmed in. Many of his English were killed, and others were drowned; for they found no passage by which to escape, except by crossing the lake in boats.
