= Dan Keating =

Irish republican (1902–2007)

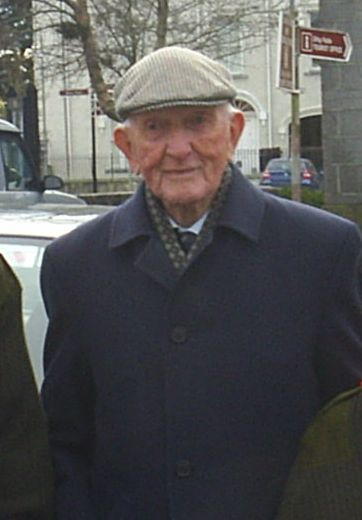
- Dan Keating in 2004
- Born: Daniel Keating; 2 January 1902; Castlemaine, County Kerry, Ireland
- Died: 2 October 2007 (aged 105); Knockbrack, County Kerry, Ireland
- Resting place: Kiltallagh Cemetery
- Occupation: Barman
- Political party: Republican Sinn Féin (from 1986); Sinn Féin (until 1986)
- Military career
- Allegiance: Irish Republic
- Paramilitary: Fianna Éireann (1918–1920); Irish Republican Army (1920–1922); Anti-Treaty IRA (1922–1939)
- Service years: 1918–1939
- Rank: Volunteer
- Units: Boherbee B Company, 3rd Battalion, 1st Kerry Brigade (IRA); London ASU (Anti-Treaty IRA)
- Conflicts: Irish War of Independence; Irish Civil War; England Campaign

Daniel Keating (Irish: Dónal Céitinn, 2 January 1902 – 2 October 2007) was a lifelong Irish republican and former president of the Republican Sinn Féin. At the time of his death, he was Ireland's oldest man and the last surviving veteran of the Irish War of Independence.

== Republican activity ==
Keating joined Fianna Éireann in 1918. In 1920, during the Irish War of Independence, he joined the Boherbee B Company, 3rd Battalion, 1st Kerry Brigade, Irish Republican Army (IRA). He first bought a firearm for one pound from a Liverpool Irish soldier of the British Army in a public house, in which he worked. Keating joined fellow Irish Republicans at Farmers Bridge near Tralee including Johnny Connor.

On 21 April 1921, Royal Irish Constabulary (RIC) Constable Denis O'Loughlin was shot dead in Knightly's public house in Tralee. Keating, Jimmy O'Connor and Percy Hanafin were suspected of the killing, and were forced to go on the run. On 1 June, Keating was involved in an ambush between Castlemaine and Milltown which claimed the lives of five RIC men. On 10 July, a day before the truce between the IRA and British forces, Keating's unit was involved in a gun battle with the British Army near Castleisland. This confrontation resulted in the deaths of four British soldiers and five IRA volunteers.

Keating opposed the 1921 Anglo-Irish Treaty and fought on the anti-treaty side in the Irish Civil War. He was involved in operations in Listowel, Kerry, Limerick, and Tipperary, before his column was arrested by Free State Forces. Keating was interned by the Irish Free State government and spent seven months in Maryborough Gaol (renamed as Portlaoise Prison) and the Curragh Camp before being one of the last prisoners released in March 1924.

In 1933, he was involved in an attempt to assassinate the leader of the Irish Blueshirts, Eoin O'Duffy, during a visit to County Kerry. The attack was to happen at Ballyseedy, where Free State forces had carried out the Ballyseedy massacre during the Irish Civil War. However, the plot failed when the person travelling with O'Duffy refused to divulge what car the latter would be travelling in.

Keating remained an IRA member for a long time after the Civil War. He was arrested several times during the 1930s on various charges relating to his Irish republican activities and in 1935 he was sentenced to 12 months in Mountjoy Prison.

Keating was active in London during the 1939/1940 IRA bombing/sabotage campaign - the S-Plan. In January 1940 Keating was put in charge of an IRA Active Service Unit in London. This group carried out a series of bombings and arson attacks in central London and remained active until the end of the campaign. Back in Ireland, Keating was arrested again in August 1940 and again interned at the Curragh Camp and was released after the May 1944 election victory of Fianna Fáil.

== Later life and death ==
In 1944 Keating married Dolly Fleming from County Waterford. Keating subsequently returned to Dublin and worked as a barman in several public houses. He retired and returned to his native Kerry in 1978, living out the rest of his life with relatives in Knockbrack. Until his death he refused to accept a state pension because he considered the 26-county Republic of Ireland an illegitimate state which usurped the 1916 Irish Republic.

"All the talk you hear these days is of peace. But there will never be peace until the people of the 32 counties elect one parliament without British interference."

In 2002, he refused the state's standard €2,500 award to centenarians from President Mary McAleese. After former IRA volunteer George Harrison died in October 2004, Keating became patron of Republican Sinn Féin until his own death. By the time of his death he was the oldest man in Ireland. He was buried in Kiltallagh cemetery near Castlemaine.

== See also ==
- List of last living war veterans
