= Maurice Day =

Maurice Day may refer to:

- Maurice Day (bishop of Clogher) (1843–1923), Anglican bishop
- Maurice Day (bishop of Cashel and Waterford) (1816–1904), Church of Ireland bishop
- Maurice Day (dean of Waterford) (1858–1916), Irish Anglican priest
- Jake Day (Maurice Day, 1892–1983) American illustrator

== See also ==
- Morris Day (born 1957), American musician, composer, and actor
- Morris Day (Viz), fictional comic character
