= Kilcurry =

Kilcurry is the name of several places in Ireland:

- Kilcurry, County Antrim, a townland; see List of townlands of County Antrim
- Kilcurry, County Longford, a townland; see List of townlands of County Longford
- Kilcurry, County Louth, a townland; see List of townlands of County Louth
