= James Stopford (bishop) =

Irish Anglican bishop

James Stopford was Bishop of Cloyne from 1753 until his death in Dublin on 23 August 1759: he had previously been Provost of Tuam, Archdeacon of Killaloe and Dean of Kilmacduagh.

He was born in London, son of Joseph Stopford, a captain in the English Army, and Elizabeth Boate, widow of Richard Brooking. His father was a younger son of James Stopford, a soldier who fought in Ireland under Oliver Cromwell, settled in County Meath and accumulated great wealth. The senior branch of the Stopford family was given the title Earl of Courtown.

The younger James attended school in Wexford and Trinity College, Dublin, where he took his degree in 1715. He was a fellow of Trinity College from 1717 to 1727. He became a close friend of Jonathan Swift (his cousin Dorothea "Dolly" Stopford, widow of the fourth Earl of Meath, was one of Swift's closest friends). Swift admired his modesty and learning, and introduced him to other leading writers of the day like Alexander Pope.

== Bibliography ==
- Fryde, E. B.; Greenway, D. E.; Porter, S.; Roy, I., eds. (1986). Handbook of British Chronology (3rd, reprinted 2003 ed.). Cambridge: Cambridge University Press. ISBN 0-521-56350-X.

Church of Ireland titles
Preceded by Edward Synge	Provost of Tuam; 1730–1753	Succeeded by Daniel Beaufort
Preceded by John Brandreth	Archdeacon of Killaloe; 1731–1748	Succeeded by Nicholas Hewetson
Preceded by John Richardson	Dean of Kilmacduagh; 1748–1753	Succeeded by William Nethercoat
Preceded by George Berkeley	Bishop of Cloyne; 1753–1759	Succeeded by Robert Johnson
