= Cutts Harman =

Irish Anglican priest

Cutts Harman (1706–1784) was an 18th-century Anglican priest in Ireland.

Harman was born in Newcastle, County Longford and educated at Trinity College, Dublin. He was Dean of Waterford from 1759 until his death.
