= Ussher Lee =

Ussher Lee, a graduate of Trinity College, Dublin was Dean of Kilmacduagh from 1803 to 1804; then Dean of Waterford from 1804 until his death in 1850.

He married in 1805, Hannah, the daughter of the Rev. Sheppard in Waterford Cathedral.

Church of Ireland titles
Preceded by Robert Gorges	Dean of Kilmacduagh; 1803–1804	Succeeded by Richard Bagwell
Preceded by William Montgomery Cole	Dean of Waterford; 1804–1850	Succeeded by Thomas Stewart Townsend
