= Hugh Bolton =

Hugh Bolton may refer to:

- Hugh Bolton (ice hockey) (1929–1999), Canadian ice hockey defenceman
- Hugh Bolton (trade unionist) (died 1947), British trade union official
- Hugh Bolton (priest) (1683–1758), Anglican priest in Ireland
- Hugh Bolton (footballer) (1879–?), Scottish footballer
