= R397 road =

R39 road may refer to:

- R397 road (Ireland)
- R397 road (South Africa)
