= R398 road =

R398 road may refer to:

- R398 road (Ireland)
- R398 road (South Africa)
