= Brickeens =

Brickeens may refer to:

- Brickeens, County Longford, a townland in Ireland
- Brickens, officially Brickeens, a village and townland in County Mayo in Ireland.
