= Drumlish (disambiguation) =

Drumlish is a village in County Longford, Ireland.

Drumlish may also refer to several other places on the island of Ireland:

- A townland in County Fermanagh; see List of townlands of County Fermanagh
- A townland in County Longford; see List of townlands of County Longford
- A townland in County Monaghan; see List of townlands of County Monaghan
- A townland in County Roscommon; see List of townlands of County Roscommon
- A townland in County Tyrone; see List of townlands of County Tyrone
