= Joseph Bermingham (priest) =

Irish Dean

Joseph Aldrich Bermingham (1801–19 May 1874) was an Irish Anglican priest. He was educated at Trinity College Dublin and held incumbencies at St Bride's, Dublin and Kellistown. He was the Dean of Kilmacduagh from 1849 until his death aged 73 at Gort on 19 May 1874.

== Notes ==
Church of Ireland titles
Preceded by Anthony La Touche Kirwan	Dean of Kilmacduagh; 1849–1874	Succeeded by Christopher Henry Gould Butson
