= Henrietta Battier =

Irish poet, satirist and actress (1751 - 1813)

- Born: Henrietta Fleming c. 1751; County Meath
- Died: October 1813; Sandymount
- Occupations: poet, political satirist, writer
- Writing career
- Pen name: A Lady, Countess of Laurel, Pat. Pindar, Patt. Pindar, Pat. T. Pindar, Polly Pindar
- Language: English
- Years active: 1783-99
- Period: Romantic

Henrietta Battier (née Fleming; c.1751 – 1813) was an Irish poet, political satirist, and sometime actress. She is best known for her squibs and poems published under the name of Pindar. A subscriber to the United Irish test, she embraced the causes of Catholic-Protestant unity, representative government, and national independence. Following the 1798 Rebellion and Ireland's incorporation in the United Kingdom, she fell out of political and literary favour and died in relative obscurity.

== Life ==
Beyond her being the daughter of John Fleming of Staholmog, County Meath, little is known of Battier's background. In 1768 she married William Battier (d. c. 1794), the estranged son of a Dublin banker of French Huguenot descent. They had at least four children (two of whom were to proceed her in death) and she began writing in order to subsidize the family's income.

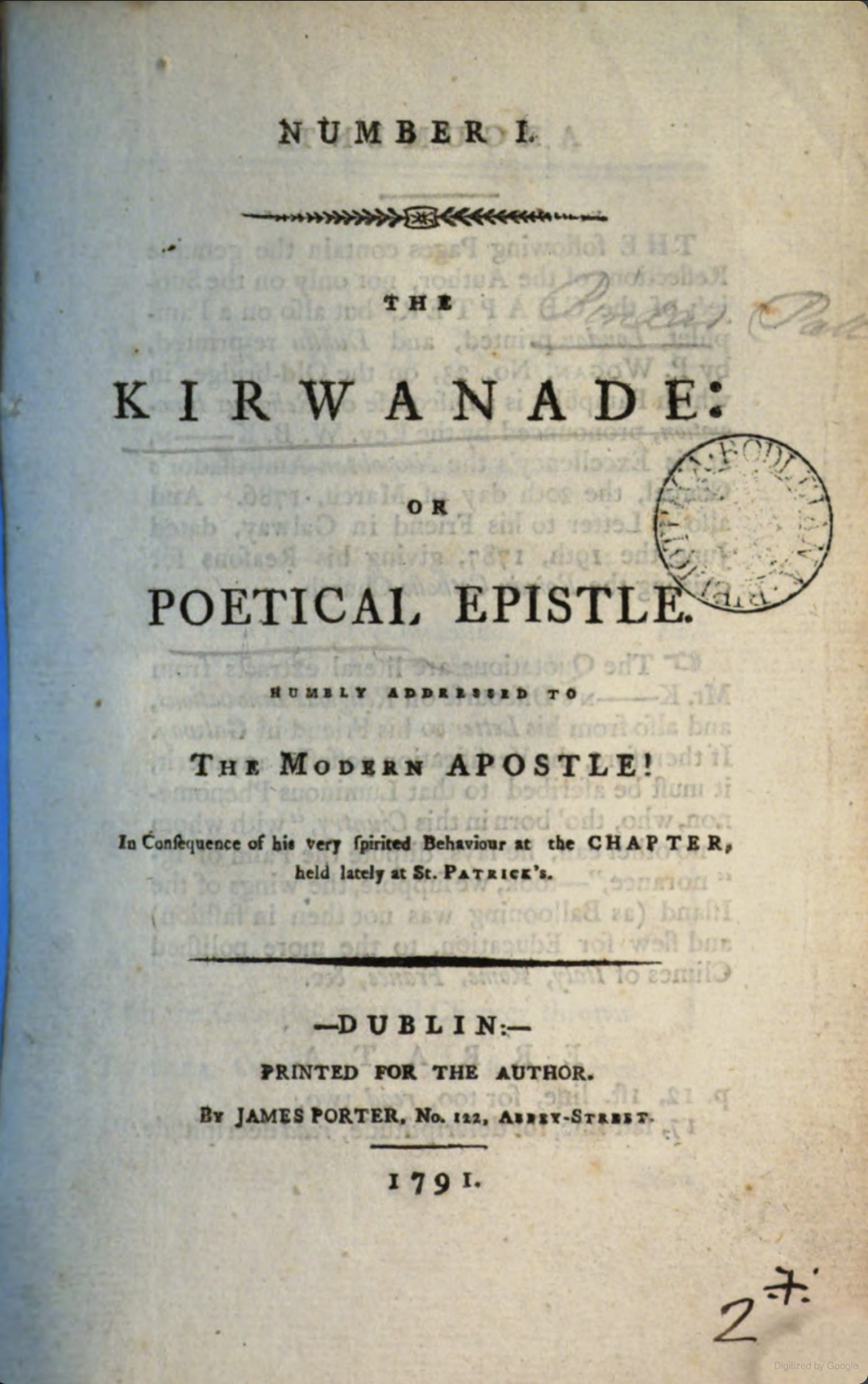
Title page of The Kirwanade by Henrietta Battier (Dublin, 1791) (Google)

== Writing ==
Visiting to London in 1783–4, she acted the role of Lady Rachel Russell in Thomas Stratford's tragedy on the death of William Russell, at the Drury Lane Theatre. She also took the opportunity to approach Samuel Johnson to request his advice about publishing a manuscript collection of poems. Johnson was encouraging and helped her to build a subscription list. He reportedly said to her, "Don't be disheartened my Child, I have been often glad of a Subscription myself." Johnson's death in 1784, as well as serious illnesses for both herself and her husband and the death of their son Gapard, for whom she published an elegy, in 1789, delayed Battier's plans.

She had some of her work published along with that of William Preston and others, in A Collection of Poems, Mostly Original, by Several Hands (London: M. Graisberry, by subscription for Joshua Edkins). Dedicated to her deceased daughter Mary, The Protected Fugitives did not appear until 1791. The volume itself adopted "a domestic and personal tone", Battier describing herself in the preface as "a better housewife than a poet".

Appreciating her ability to turn back "condescending English attitudes to Ireland . . . . with witty defiance", her Irish subscribers for the volume of "Miscellaneous Verse" included the liberal-minded Elizabeth Rawdon, Countess of Moira; the leader of the Patriot opposition in the Irish Parliament, Henry Grattan; and Dr. William Drennan, lead instigator of the Society of United Irishmen.

The same year, 1791, saw the publication in Dublin, under the name "Pat. Pindar" (Pindar, as the pseudonym of John Wolcot, was already associated with satire), of The Kirwanade, or Poetical Epistle in which she mocked the celebrated Anglican clergyman and Catholic apostate, Walter Kirwan. In 1793 in The Gibbonade she pilloried the Attorney-General, John FitzGibbon, Earl of Clare (a "glitt'ring snake"), and others in the London-appointed Dublin Castle Irish executive. These were among a series of pointed political lampoons: "magnificently controlled vituperation in vigorous, colloquial heroic couplets." Her subsequent satires argued for reform, religious tolerance, and Irish independence.

In "Bitter Orange", which appeared in the United Irishman's paper The Press, and in The Lemon (1797), she denounced the loyalist and sectarian Orange Order as "boys of the ascendancy" formed to support the "bondage of our hundred years". With another of Lady Moira's bluestocking set, Margaret King, she responded to an appeal in The Press for women to "act for the amelioration of your country in the mighty crisis that awaits her": she took the United Irish test. Including extracts from "Bitter Orange" in his Literary Remains of the United Irishmen (1887), R. R. Madden described Battier as "the Sappho" of the republican movement.

== Last years ==
Battier died in poverty in Dublin in 1813. Her literary and political stock had fallen in the wake of the 1798 rebellion and of the loss, through the 1800 Acts of Union, of what remained of Irish autonomy. Her last political intervention was a broadside against the abolition of the Irish Parliament. In acknowledgement of an elaborate spoof, it was addressed to "the ill-fated King Stephen III of Dalkley". In 1797, the radical bookseller Stephen Armitage had attracted some 20,000 people to Dalkey Island, lying off Dublin, to hear him proclaim himself, with great ceremony, the island's sovereign and Battier his "poet laureate".

In her final years, Battier was visited in her Fade Street lodgings by Thomas Moore. While a student at Trinity College in 1796, the future "bard of Ireland" had begun reciting his own, often satiric, verse at her literary salon.

== Critical reception ==
Battier's work has been anthologised in Stephen C. Behrendt's Romantic-Era Irish Women Poets in English (2021). The Kirwanade, or, Poetical Epistle and An Address on … the Projected Union are available through open access, and the rest of her publications are available through EEBO. After years of obscurity, her work has recently become of interest to researchers.

== Selected works ==
- The mousiad: an heroi-comic poem. Canto I. By Polly Pindar, half-sister to Peter Pindar. Dublin: P. Byrne, 1787/London: J. Ridgway, 1787(attributed).
- An epistle from Patrick Pindar, to the hills and the vallies, and all whom it may concern. London: Printed for the benefit of the Down Cathedral, 1790.
- The Protected Fugitives. A Collection of Miscellaneous Poems, the Genuine Productions of a Lady. Never before Published. Dublin: printed for the author by James Porter, 1791.
- The Kirwanade, or, Poetical Epistle. Humbly Addressed to the Modern Apostle. Published in two parts. Dublin: printed for the author by James Porter, 1791.
- The Gibbonade, or, Political Reviewer. Three issues, Dublin: printed for the author, 1 May 1793 – 12 September 1794.
- Marriage ode royal after the manner of Dryden. Dublin and London, 1795.
- [An irregular ode] to Edward Byrne, Esq. of mullinahack, on his marriage with Miss Roe, step-daughter to one Noble Lord, and niece to another!!! Dublin: Stephen Colbert, 1797.
- "Bitter Orange", The Press, 1797
- The lemon, A poem, by Pat. Pindar, in answer to a scandalous libel, entitled, The orange; written [tho' anonymous] by the Reverend Dr. Bobadil. 1797. (2 editions, 1797. 2nd canto, 1798.)
- An Address on … the Projected Union, To the Illustrious Stephen III, King of Dalkey, Emperor of the Mugglins. Dublin: printed for the author, 1799.

== Notes ==
=== Bibliography ===
- "Battier, Henrietta (Fleming)." The Feminist Companion to Literature in English. Virginia Blain, et al., eds. New Haven and London: Yale UP, 1990. 70.
- Clarke, Frances. "Battier, Henrietta", Dictionary of Irish Biography. www.dib.ie. 2009.
- Grundy, Isobel. “Battier, Henrietta (c.1751–1813).” Oxford Dictionary of National Biography. Ed. H. C. G. Matthew and Brian Harrison. Oxford: OUP, 2004. 5 Apr. 2007.
- Jones, Catherine. “Irish Romanticism.” A History of Irish Women's Poetry. Ed. Ailbhe Darcy and David Wheatley. Cambridge: Cambridge UP, Cambridge, 2021, pp. 105–126.doi:10.1017/9781108778596.007
- Todd, Janet. Rebel Daughters: Ireland in Conflict 1798. London: Penguin, 2004 ISBN 9780141004891.
