= List of townlands of County Longford =

This is a sortable table of the approximately 944 townlands in County Longford, Ireland.

Duplicate names occur where there is more than one townland with the same name in the county. Names marked in bold typeface are towns and villages, and the word Town appears for those entries in the Acres column.

== Townland list ==
Townland	Acres	Barony	Civil parish	Poor law union
Abbey Land	9	Ardagh	Mostrim	Granard
Abbeycartron	219	Longford	Templemichael	Longford
Abbeyderg	867	Moydow	Taghsheenod	Ballymahon
**Abbeylara**	Town	Granard	Abbeylara	Granard
Abbeylara	296	Granard	Abbeylara	Granard
Abbeyshrule	769	Shrule	Abbeyshrule	Ballymahon
Acres	38	Granard	Clonbroney	Granard
Aghaboy	442	Longford	Killoe	Longford
Aghaboy	161	Granard	Granard	Granard
Aghabrack	213	Granard	Granard	Granard
Aghacordrinan	440	Granard	Columbkille	Granard
Aghadegnan	177	Longford	Templemichael	Longford
Aghadonagh	84	Ardagh	Mostrim	Granard
Aghadowry	561	Longford	Killoe	Longford
Aghafad	22	Ardagh	Ballymacormick	Longford
Aghafin	347	Ardagh	Mostrim	Granard
Aghagah	286	Granard	Killoe	Granard
Aghagreagh	1,145	Granard	Columbkille	Granard
Aghakeel	46	Rathcline	Rathcline	Ballymahon
Aghakeeran	414	Granard	Columbkille	Granard
Aghakeeran & Killashee	371	Moydow	Killashee	Longford
Aghakilmore	604	Granard	Columbkille	Granard
Aghakine	553	Granard	Columbkille	Granard
Aghaloughan	121	Rathcline	Rathcline	Longford
Aghalust	48	Moydow	Ballymacormick	Longford
Aghamore	124	Granard	Clonbroney	Granard
Aghamore	108	Rathcline	Rathcline	Longford
Aghamore	87	Ardagh	Street	Granard
Aghamore Lower	313	Granard	Columbkille	Longford
Aghamore Upper	459	Granard	Columbkille	Granard
Aghanageeragh	178	Ardagh	Ardagh	Longford
Aghanahown	129	Ardagh	Ardagh	Longford
Aghantragh	177	Moydow	Ballymacormick	Longford
Aghanvally	68	Moydow	Taghsheenod	Ballymahon
Agharanagh	173	Shrule	Taghshinny	Ballymahon
Agharanagh	96	Rathcline	Rathcline	Longford
Aghareagh	175	Longford	Templemichael	Longford
Aghareagh	60	Ardagh	Street	Granard
Aghareagh Bog	147	Longford	Templemichael	Longford
Agharickard	93	Ardagh	Templemichael	Longford
Agharra	442	Shrule	Agharra	Ballymahon
Aghavadden	123	Rathcline	Cashel	Ballymahon
Aghaward	281	Granard	Clonbroney	Granard
Aghinaspick	231	Moydow	Moydow	Longford
Aghintemple	191	Ardagh	Ardagh	Longford
Aghnacally Glebe	34	Ardagh	Templemichael	Longford
Aghnacliff	236	Granard	Columbkille	Granard
Aghnacranagh	42	Rathcline	Kilcommock	Ballymahon
Aghnacross	85	Rathcline	Cashel	Ballymahon
Aghnagarron	511	Granard	Granard	Granard
Aghnagore	388	Longford	Killashee	Longford
Aghnamaddoo	199	Longford	Killoe	Longford
Aghnashannagh	386	Granard	Clonbroney	Granard
Aghnashingan	95	Moydow	Kilcommock	Ballymahon
Aghnasillagh	256	Moydow	Kilglass	Ballymahon
Aghnaskea	43	Moydow	Killashee	Longford
Aghnavealoge	356	Ardagh	Rathreagh	Ballymahon
Ahanagh	146	Longford	Mohill	Longford
Aleenagh	91	Ardagh	Templemichael	Longford
Annagh	542	Longford	Killoe	Longford
Annagh	295	Rathcline	Noughaval	Ballymahon
Annagh Beg	186	Moydow	Killashee	Longford
Annagh More	423	Moydow	Killashee	Longford
Annaghcooleen	206	Longford	Mohill	Longford
Annaghdaniel	199	Granard	Columbkille	Longford
**Ardagh**	Town	Ardagh	Ardagh	Longford
Ardagullion	661	Granard	Granard	Granard
Ardanragh	556	Shrule	Agharra	Ballymahon
Ardboghil	119	Ardagh	Ardagh	Longford
Ardnacassagh	168	Ardagh	Templemichael	Longford
Ardoghil	254	Rathcline	Shrule	Ballymahon
Ards	395	Moydow	Kilcommock	Ballymahon
Ash Island	1	Granard	Killoe	Granard
Asnagh	449	Granard	Granard	Granard
Aughine	64	Moydow	Moydow	Longford
Back of the Hill	329	Ardagh	Ardagh	Longford
Ballagh	226	Rathcline	Cashel	Ballymahon
Ballagh	216	Longford	Clongesh	Longford
Ballagh (Achmuty) (or Achmuty)	135	Longford	Clongesh	Longford
Ballaghgowla	41	Ardagh	Street	Granard
Ballina	145	Rathcline	Cashel	Ballymahon
**Ballinalee**	Town	Granard	Clonbroney	Granard
Ballinalee (or Saintjohnstown)	161	Granard	Clonbroney	Granard
Ballinamore	240	Moydow	Ballymacormick	Longford
Ballincurry	159	Longford	Killoe	Longford
Ballindagny & Cullyvore	291	Ardagh	Mostrim	Granard
Ballinlough	326	Granard	Granard	Granard
Ballinreaghan	138	Ardagh	Ardagh	Longford
Ballinree and Ballymoat	310	Ardagh	Ardagh	Longford
Ballinroddy	302	Ardagh	Ardagh	Longford
Ballinrooey	493	Granard	Abbeylara	Granard
Ballinrud East	108	Granard	Granard	Granard
Ballinrud Glebe	41	Granard	Granard	Granard
Ballinrud West	14	Granard	Granard	Granard
Ballintempan	87	Moydow	Ballymacormick	Longford
Ballintober (Bonny)	172	Moydow	Taghsheenod	Ballymahon
Ballintober (Rock)	67	Moydow	Taghsheenod	Ballymahon
Ballinulty Lower	299	Granard	Columbkille	Granard
Ballinulty Upper	311	Granard	Columbkille	Granard
Ballinvoher	42	Moydow	Moydow	Longford
Balloo	272	Ardagh	Street	Granard
Ballybeg	250	Moydow	Taghsheenod	Ballymahon
Ballyboy	261	Granard	Abbeylara	Granard
Ballybranigan	283	Rathcline	Shrule	Ballymahon
Ballybrien	236	Granard	Granard	Granard
Ballyclamay	413	Shrule	Forgney	Ballymahon
Ballyclare	115	Moydow	Killashee	Longford
Ballyclare	30	Moydow	Ballymacormick	Longford
Ballycloghan	208	Moydow	Kilglass	Ballymahon
Ballycore	148	Moydow	Killashee	Longford
Ballydrum	184	Moydow	Killashee	Longford
Ballyduffy	730	Granard	Killoe	Granard
Ballygar	77	Ardagh	Ardagh	Longford
Ballygarve	463	Longford	Killoe	Longford
Ballygibbagh	75	Moydow	Taghsheenod	Ballymahon
Ballygilchrist	263	Granard	Granard	Granard
Ballyglassin	375	Shrule	Kilglass	Ballymahon
Ballyhoolivan	177	Granard	Killoe	Granard
Ballykenny	308	Longford	Clongesh	Longford
Ballyknock	212	Moydow	Kilcommock	Ballymahon
Ballymaclifford	104	Ardagh	Kilglass	Ballymahon
Ballymacroly	62	Granard	Granard	Granard
Ballymacshane	72	Shrule	Agharra	Ballymahon
Ballymacwilliam	119	Ardagh	Templemichael	Longford
**Ballymahon**	Town	Shrule	Noughaval	Ballymahon
**Ballymahon**	Town	Rathcline	Shrule	Ballymahon
Ballymahon	276	Rathcline	Shrule	Ballymahon
Ballymakeegan	243	Ardagh	Ballymacormick	Longford
Ballymaurice	455	Granard	Granard	Granard
Ballymichan	138	Moydow	Ballymacormick	Longford
Ballyminion	291	Ardagh	Ballymacormick	Longford
Ballymoat & Ballinree	310	Ardagh	Ardagh	Longford
Ballymore	551	Granard	Granard	Granard
Ballymulvey	451	Rathcline	Shrule	Ballymahon
Ballynacross	392	Granard	Granard	Granard
Ballynagoshen	267	Longford	Killoe	Longford
Ballynahinch	425	Rathcline	Cashel	Ballymahon
Ballynakill	525	Moydow	Killashee	Longford
Ballynamanagh	219	Moydow	Taghsheenod	Ballymahon
Ballynascraw	329	Granard	Clonbroney	Granard
Ballyreaghan	239	Granard	Clonbroney	Granard
Ballyrevagh	236	Rathcline	Cashel	Ballymahon
Ballywalter	190	Ardagh	Ardagh	Longford
Ballywillin	364	Granard	Granard	Granard
Balnagall	112	Granard	Granard	Granard
Banghill	74	Ardagh	Ardagh	Longford
Barnacor	354	Rathcline	Rathcline	Longford
Barnacor	294	Rathcline	Shrule	Ballymahon
Barne	200	Ardagh	Mostrim	Granard
Barney	360	Ardagh	Ardagh	Longford
Barneygole	269	Ardagh	Ardagh	Longford
Barrack Bog	14	Ardagh	Ballymacormick	Longford
Barragh Beg	217	Longford	Killoe	Longford
Barragh More	434	Longford	Killoe	Longford
Barroe	33	Moydow	Moydow	Longford
**Barry**	Town	Shrule	Taghshinny	Ballymahon
Barry	242	Shrule	Taghshinny	Ballymahon
Barry	149	Shrule	Kilcommock	Ballymahon
Bawn	538	Moydow	Moydow	Longford
Bawn	381	Longford	Killoe	Longford
Bawn Mountain	283	Moydow	Moydow	Longford
Begnagh	449	Moydow	Killashee	Longford
Birrinagh	336	Granard	Killoe	Granard
Bleanavoher	325	Rathcline	Rathcline	Longford
Bohermore	351	Ardagh	Ardagh	Longford
Bohernacross	92	Ardagh	Ardagh	Longford
Bohernameeltoge	130	Longford	Killoe	Longford
Bracklon	623	Ardagh	Mostrim	Granard
Breaghy	167	Granard	Clonbroney	Granard
Breanrisk	254	Longford	Clongesh	Longford
Breanriskcullew	254	Longford	Killoe	Granard
Breany	801	Ardagh	Kilglass	Longford
Brianstown	314	Longford	Clongesh	Longford
Brickeens	146	Moydow	Ballymacormick	Longford
Briskil	333	Longford	Clongesh	Longford
Brocklagh	378	Longford	Killoe	Longford
Brownbog	31	Longford	Templemichael	Longford
Bunacloy	40	Moydow	Killashee	Longford
Bunalough	47	Moydow	Moydow	Longford
Bunanass	134	Longford	Mohill	Longford
Bundoon	65	Longford	Killoe	Longford
**Bunlahy**	Town	Granard	Granard	Granard
Bunlahy	177	Granard	Granard	Granard
Bushy Island	1	Rathcline	Rathcline	Longford
Cahanagh	181	Longford	Clongesh	Longford
Caherdague	40	Ardagh	Street	Granard
Caldragh	132	Longford	Clongesh	Longford
Caldraghmore	176	Moydow	Ballymacormick	Longford
Calfpark	10	Moydow	Ballymacormick	Longford
Caltragh Beg	188	Rathcline	Cashel	Ballymahon
Caltragh More	206	Rathcline	Cashel	Ballymahon
Cam	406	Ardagh	Mostrim	Granard
Camagh	387	Granard	Abbeylara	Granard
Camagh	355	Longford	Killoe	Longford
Camlisk Beg	59	Ardagh	Mostrim	Granard
Camlisk More	147	Ardagh	Mostrim	Granard
Carn	287	Shrule	Kilglass	Ballymahon
Carnan	267	Ardagh	Ardagh	Longford
Carragh	279	Granard	Granard	Granard
Carrickadorrish	373	Granard	Columbkille	Granard
Carrickateane	205	Granard	Clonbroney	Granard
Carrickbeg	44	Shrule	Noughaval	Ballymahon
Carrickboy	149	Shrule	Kilglass	Ballymahon
Carrickduff	390	Granard	Abbeylara	Granard
Carrickedmond	245	Moydow	Taghsheenod	Ballymahon
CarrickglassDemesne	434	Longford	Killoe	Longford
CarrickglassDemesne	144	Ardagh	Templemichael	Longford
Carrickmaguirk	348	Granard	Columbkille	Granard
Carrickmoran	90	Rathcline	Cashel	Ballymahon
Carrickmoyragh	376	Longford	Clongesh	Longford
Carrigeen	302	Ardagh	Rathreagh	Ballymahon
Carrigeen	94	Moydow	Ballymacormick	Longford
Carrigeen	48	Moydow	Taghsheenod	Ballymahon
Carrigeens	117	Rathcline	Rathcline	Longford
Carrow Beg	225	Rathcline	Cashel	Ballymahon
Carrow More	87	Rathcline	Cashel	Ballymahon
Carrowbeg	147	Longford	Clongesh	Longford
Carrowdunican	68	Rathcline	Cashel	Ballymahon
Carrowlinan	359	Granard	Clonbroney	Granard
Carrowmanagh	169	Moydow	Ballymacormick	Longford
Carrownphull	83	Rathcline	Rathcline	Longford
Carrowroe	347	Rathcline	Rathcline	Longford
Carrowrory	131	Rathcline	Cashel	Ballymahon
Carrowstrawly	190	Rathcline	Rathcline	Longford
Cartoon	67	Rathcline	Cashel	Ballymahon
Cartron	708	Granard	Granard	Granard
Cartron	230	Shrule	Noughaval	Ballymahon
Cartron Big	180	Ardagh	Templemichael	Longford
Cartron Little	117	Ardagh	Templemichael	Longford
Cartronageeragh	237	Ardagh	Ballymacormick	Longford
Cartronamarkey	266	Granard	Abbeylara	Granard
Cartronawar	278	Ardagh	Ardagh	Longford
Cartronawar	95	Rathcline	Kilcommock	Ballymahon
Cartronbore	226	Granard	Granard	Granard
Cartronboy	136	Rathcline	Shrule	Ballymahon
Cartronbrack	272	Rathcline	Kilcommock	Ballymahon
Cartroncar	210	Granard	Granard	Granard
Cartronfin	52	Shrule	Taghshinny	Ballymahon
Cartrongar	52	Longford	Clongesh	Longford
Cartrongarrow	490	Moydow	Ardagh	Longford
Cartrongolan	441	Longford	Killoe	Longford
Cartronlebagh	199	Longford	Templemichael	Longford
Cartronreagh	224	Ardagh	Clonbroney	Granard
Cartrons	316	Longford	Clongesh	Longford
Cartrons	252	Moydow	Kilcommock	Ballymahon
Cashel	312	Rathcline	Cashel	Ballymahon
Cashelbeg	167	Rathcline	Rathcline	Longford
Castlebaun	256	Granard	Clonbroney	Granard
Castlebrock	239	Granard	Clonbroney	Granard
Castlecore	268	Rathcline	Shrule	Ballymahon
Castleforbes Demesne	1,347	Longford	Clongesh	Longford
Castlenugent	500	Ardagh	Granard	Granard
Castlerea	150	Moydow	Moydow	Longford
Castlerea Mountain	458	Moydow	Moydow	Ballymahon
Castlewilder	269	Shrule	Agharra	Ballymahon
Cavan	135	Granard	Clonbroney	Granard
Churchquarter	49	Granard	Granard	Granard
Claras	532	Rathcline	Cashel	Ballymahon
Clawinch	39	Rathcline	Cashel	Ballymahon
Cleenrah	355	Granard	Columbkille	Granard
Cleggill	240	Longford	Clongesh	Longford
Cleraun	335	Rathcline	Cashel	Ballymahon
Clogh	273	Granard	Abbeylara	Granard
Clogh	185	Rathcline	Kilcommock	Ballymahon
Cloghan	384	Moydow	Moydow	Ballymahon
Cloghan	339	Shrule	Forgney	Ballymahon
Cloghchurnel	563	Granard	Granard	Granard
Clogher and Rinn	261	Longford	Killashee	Longford
Clonbroney	333	Granard	Clonbroney	Granard
Clonca	297	Ardagh	Mostrim	Granard
Cloncowley	361	Longford	Killoe	Longford
Clontumpher	613	Longford	Killoe	Longford
Clontymullan	654	Ardagh	Rathreagh	Ballymahon
Clonwhelan	387	Ardagh	Mostrim	Granard
Cloonageeher	707	Longford	Mohill	Longford
Cloonagh	676	Longford	Killoe	Longford
Cloonagh	463	Granard	Columbkille	Granard
Cloonagh	98	Moydow	Kilglass	Ballymahon
Cloonagh & Kilglass	70	Ardagh	Kilglass	Ballymahon
Cloonaghmore	171	Granard	Abbeylara	Granard
Cloonahard	366	Ardagh	Templemichael	Longford
Cloonahussey	153	Ardagh	Templemichael	Longford
Cloonanny	175	Moydow	Ballymacormick	Longford
Cloonanny Glebe	177	Longford	Templemichael	Longford
Cloonard	416	Longford	Killashee	Longford
Cloonard	409	Rathcline	Taghshinny	Ballymahon
Cloonart North	266	Longford	Mohill	Longford
Cloonart South	294	Longford	Mohill	Longford
Cloonback	320	Granard	Columbkille	Longford
Cloonbalt	269	Longford	Templemichael	Longford
Cloonbearla	693	Moydow	Killashee	Longford
Cloonbony	540	Rathcline	Rathcline	Longford
Cloonbreany	492	Rathcline	Kilcommock	Ballymahon
Cloonbrin	442	Shrule	Abbeyshrule	Ballymahon
Cloonbrock	383	Moydow	Killashee	Longford
Clooncallow	453	Shrule	Forgney	Ballymahon
Clooncaulfield	368	Ardagh	Ardagh	Longford
Clooncolligan	196	Longford	Mohill	Longford
Clooncoose	382	Ardagh	Templemichael	Longford
Clooncoose	107	Granard	Clonbroney	Granard
Clooncullen	798	Shrule	Noughaval	Ballymahon
**Cloondara**	Town	Longford	Killashee	Longford
Cloondara	1,429	Longford	Killashee	Longford
Cloonee	236	Longford	Killoe	Longford
Clooneen	429	Granard	Columbkille	Granard
Clooneen	378	Shrule	Forgney	Ballymahon
Clooneen (Beirne)	114	Longford	Mohill	Longford
Clooneen (Cox)	149	Longford	Mohill	Longford
Clooneen (Kennedy)	139	Longford	Mohill	Longford
Clooneen (Shanly)	123	Longford	Mohill	Longford
Clooneeny	413	Ardagh	Ballymacormick	Longford
Cloonellan	403	Longford	Clongesh	Longford
Cloonelly	596	Longford	Killoe	Longford
Cloonevit	254	Moydow	Moydow	Longford
Cloonfide	146	Moydow	Taghsheenod	Ballymahon
Cloonfin	629	Granard	Granard	Granard
Cloonfinfy	341	Moydow	Killashee	Longford
Cloonfiugh	328	Moydow	Killashee	Longford
Cloonfore	999	Rathcline	Rathcline	Longford
Clooniher	367	Longford	Mohill	Longford
Cloonkeen	306	Rathcline	Shrule	Ballymahon
Cloonkeen	269	Moydow	Taghsheenod	Ballymahon
Cloonkeen	142	Moydow	Ballymacormick	Longford
Cloonker	257	Moydow	Moydow	Longford
Cloonmacart	426	Longford	Killoe	Longford
Cloonmee	397	Rathcline	Cashel	Ballymahon
Cloonmore	670	Moydow	Killashee	Longford
Cloonmucker	138	Moydow	Moydow	Longford
Cloonrallagh	400	Longford	Templemichael	Longford
Cloonscott	369	Moydow	Taghsheenod	Ballymahon
Cloonsellan	243	Moydow	Killashee	Longford
Cloonshannagh (or Coolamber Manor Demesne)	590	Ardagh	Street	Granard
Cloonsheerin	212	Moydow	Killashee	Longford
Cloontabeg	270	Rathcline	Rathcline	Longford
Cloontagh	326	Longford	Clongesh	Longford
Cloontamore	566	Moydow	Killashee	Longford
Cloontirm	350	Ardagh	Ballymacormick	Longford
Cloonturk	275	Ardagh	Ballymacormick	Longford
Clygeen	102	Ardagh	Kilglass	Ballymahon
Clynan	447	Shrule	Forgney	Ballymahon
Colehill	171	Shrule	Taghshinny	Ballymahon
Collum	360	Rathcline	Cashel	Ballymahon
Commock	117	Moydow	Moydow	Longford
Commons	55	Rathcline	Cashel	Ballymahon
Commons North	159	Rathcline	Rathcline	Longford
Commons South	31	Rathcline	Rathcline	Longford
Coolagherty	322	Granard	Granard	Granard
Coolamber	275	Ardagh	Street	Granard
Coolamber Manor (or Cloonshannagh)	590	Ardagh	Street	Granard
Coolcaw	277	Ardagh	Ardagh	Longford
Coolcor	312	Granard	Granard	Granard
Coolcraff	836	Granard	Abbeylara	Granard
Cooldoney	583	Granard	Abbeylara	Granard
Cooleeny	687	Ardagh	Templemichael	Longford
Cooleshill (or Richford)	289	Ardagh	Templemichael	Longford
Coolnafinnoge	28	Ardagh	Kilglass	Ballymahon
Coolnahinch	318	Moydow	Kilcommock	Ballymahon
Coolnahinch	121	Ardagh	Templemichael	Longford
Coonkeel	313	Moydow	Killashee	Longford
Corbaun (or Leitrim)	151	Granard	Columbkille	Granard
Corbeagh	137	Granard	Clonbroney	Granard
Corboy	923	Longford	Killoe	Longford
Corclaragh	431	Ardagh	Mostrim	Granard
Cordivin	135	Moydow	Ballymacormick	Longford
Corglass	750	Longford	Killoe	Longford
Corlagan	12	Moydow	Ballymacormick	Longford
Corlea	659	Rathcline	Kilcommock	Ballymahon
Cormaglava	356	Rathcline	Cashel	Ballymahon
Cornacarta	160	Rathcline	Kilcommock	Ballymahon
Cornacullew	652	Longford	Killoe	Longford
Cornadowagh	515	Rathcline	Cashel	Ballymahon
Cornadrung	402	Granard	Columbkille	Granard
Cornafunshin	262	Longford	Killoe	Longford
Cornaguillagh	101	Rathcline	Cashel	Ballymahon
Cornahoo	75	Moydow	Kilcommock	Ballymahon
Cornamucklagh	404	Shrule	Forgney	Ballymahon
Cornapark	481	Ardagh	Ardagh	Longford
Corneddan	440	Longford	Killoe	Longford
Cornollen	169	Longford	Clongesh	Longford
Corrabaun	200	Longford	Killoe	Longford
Corrabaun	135	Shrule	Taghshinny	Ballymahon
Corrabaun	74	Ardagh	Templemichael	Longford
Corrabola	282	Shrule	Taghshinny	Ballymahon
Corrabola	46	Ardagh	Rathreagh	Ballymahon
Corradooey	176	Ardagh	Templemichael	Longford
Corragarrow	177	Moydow	Killashee	Longford
Corragarrow	93	Longford	Templemichael	Longford
Corralough	248	Rathcline	Rathcline	Longford
Corrinagh	449	Granard	Columbkille	Longford
Corrool (Brennan)	162	Rathcline	Cashel	Ballymahon
Corrool (Fox)	204	Rathcline	Cashel	Ballymahon
Corrool (Kenny)	318	Rathcline	Cashel	Ballymahon
Corry	315	Longford	Clongesh	Longford
Corry	208	Shrule	Kilglass	Ballymahon
Corrycorka	152	Shrule	Kilglass	Ballymahon
Corryena	140	Rathcline	Kilcommock	Ballymahon
Craane	90	Moydow	Ballymacormick	Longford
Cranalagh More	834	Ardagh	Mostrim	Granard
Cranally	269	Granard	Abbeylara	Granard
Crancam (or Kilfintan Lower)	50	Ardagh	Street	Granard
Cranlagh Beg	449	Ardagh	Mostrim	Granard
Creagh	238	Rathcline	Kilcommock	Ballymahon
Creelaghta	432	Longford	Killoe	Longford
Creenagh	316	Longford	Clongesh	Longford
Creevagh Beg	455	Shrule	Noughaval	Ballymahon
Creevaghmore	384	Shrule	Forgney	Ballymahon
Creevaghmore	164	Shrule	Noughaval	Ballymahon
Creeve	320	Longford	Killoe	Longford
Creevy	549	Granard	Granard	Granard
Crockaun	84	Moydow	Ballymacormick	Longford
Cross	204	Ardagh	Ardagh	Longford
Cross	121	Rathcline	Cashel	Ballymahon
Crossea North	253	Ardagh	Ardagh	Longford
Crossea South	300	Ardagh	Ardagh	Longford
Crott	780	Granard	Killoe	Granard
Crowdrumman	294	Longford	Killoe	Longford
Cuingareen	265	Granard	Columbkille	Longford
Culleenmore	459	Granard	Columbkille	Granard
Cullentragh	504	Rathcline	Rathcline	Ballymahon
Cullentragh	143	Rathcline	Cashel	Ballymahon
Culloge	111	Ardagh	Mostrim	Granard
Cullyvore and Ballindagny	291	Ardagh	Mostrim	Granard
Culnagore	184	Rathcline	Cashel	Ballymahon
Culray	658	Granard	Abbeylara	Granard
Curraghmore	204	Moydow	Moydow	Ballymahon
Curreen	61	Rathcline	Rathcline	Longford
Curry	359	Moydow	Ballymacormick	Longford
Curry	187	Moydow	Kilcommock	Ballymahon
Curry	167	Ardagh	Street	Granard
Curry	148	Ardagh	Mostrim	Granard
Currycahill	105	Granard	Clonbroney	Granard
Currycreaghan	306	Moydow	Taghsheenod	Ballymahon
Currygrane	600	Granard	Clonbroney	Granard
Currygranny	427	Longford	Clongesh	Longford
Dalystown	444	Granard	Abbeylara	Granard
Daroge	412	Rathcline	Shrule	Ballymahon
Deanscurragh	75	Ardagh	Templemichael	Longford
Deerpark	271	Shrule	Agharra	Ballymahon
Deerpark	191	Longford	Clongesh	Longford
Deerpark	45	Ardagh	Ardagh	Longford
Demesne	146	Longford	Templemichael	Longford
Derawley	649	Longford	Killoe	Longford
Derragh	1,115	Granard	Abbeylara	Granard
Derraghan Beg	387	Rathcline	Cashel	Ballymahon
Derraghan More	723	Rathcline	Cashel	Ballymahon
Derreenavoggy	187	Granard	Columbkille	Granard
Derrindiff	329	Rathcline	Cashel	Ballymahon
Derryad	639	Moydow	Killashee	Longford
Derryad	457	Rathcline	Kilcommock	Ballymahon
Derryaroge	382	Moydow	Killashee	Longford
Derryart	270	Moydow	Killashee	Ballymahon
Derrycassan	944	Granard	Columbkille	Granard
Derrycolumb	409	Rathcline	Cashel	Ballymahon
Derrydarragh	289	Rathcline	Cashel	Ballymahon
Derrygeel	321	Rathcline	Rathcline	Longford
Derryglash	211	Rathcline	Cashel	Ballymahon
Derryglogher	326	Moydow	Kilcommock	Ballymahon
Derrygowna	902	Rathcline	Cashel	Ballymahon
Derryharrow	275	Longford	Templemichael	Longford
Derryheelan	250	Longford	Killoe	Longford
Derrylough	517	Rathcline	Kilcommock	Ballymahon
Derryloughbannow	161	Rathcline	Rathcline	Longford
Derrymacar	426	Rathcline	Cashel	Ballymahon
Derrymany	311	Rathcline	Cashel	Ballymahon
Derrymore	357	Moydow	Ardagh	Longford
Derrynabuntale	526	Rathcline	Shrule	Ballymahon
Derrynacrit	115	Longford	Clongesh	Longford
Derrynacross	328	Longford	Killoe	Longford
Derrynagalliagh	348	Rathcline	Cashel	Ballymahon
Derrynagran	293	Rathcline	Cashel	Ballymahon
Derrynaskea	531	Moydow	Kilcommock	Ballymahon
Derryneel	72	Granard	Clonbroney	Granard
Derryoghil	642	Moydow	Kilcommock	Ballymahon
Derryshannoge	538	Rathcline	Cashel	Longford
Derryveagh	295	Rathcline	Kilcommock	Ballymahon
Doonacurry	58	Rathcline	Kilcommock	Ballymahon
Doonacurry	26	Rathcline	Shrule	Ballymahon
Doonameran	75	Moydow	Ballymacormick	Longford
Dooroc	376	Longford	Killoe	Longford
Doory	606	Shrule	Taghshinny	Ballymahon
Drinan	391	Rathcline	Shrule	Ballymahon
Dring	241	Granard	Columbkille	Granard
Drumanure	414	Shrule	Abbeyshrule	Ballymahon
Drumard	544	Longford	Killoe	Granard
Drumbad	234	Longford	Killoe	Longford
Drumbaun	294	Ardagh	Ardagh	Longford
Drumderg	401	Granard	Clonbroney	Granard
Drumhalry	895	Granard	Killoe	Granard
Drumhaughly	190	Longford	Killoe	Longford
Druminacrehir	353	Granard	Columbkille	Granard
Drumming	597	Moydow	Kilglass	Ballymahon
**Drumlish**	Town	Longford	Drumlish	Longford
Drumlish	557	Longford	Killoe	Longford
Drumlougher	75	Ardagh	Ardagh	Longford
Drumman	71	Ardagh	Street	Granard
Drummeel	737	Granard	Clonbroney	Granard
Drumnacooha	243	Longford	Killoe	Longford
Drumnacor	237	Rathcline	Shrule	Ballymahon
Drumnacross	467	Granard	Clonbroney	Granard
Drumnahara	183	Granard	Clonbroney	Granard
Drumnee	565	Rathcline	Cashel	Ballymahon
Drumroe	207	Ardagh	Ardagh	Longford
Drumure	351	Longford	Clongesh	Longford
Drumury	283	Granard	Killoe	Granard
Dunbeggan	324	Granard	Columbkille	Granard
Dunbeggan	284	Moydow	Ballymacormick	Longford
Edenmore	898	Longford	Killoe	Longford
Edera	303	Rathcline	Shrule	Ballymahon
Edercloon	201	Longford	Mohill	Longford
Ederland	67	Granard	Clonbroney	Granard
**Edgeworthstown**	Town	Ardagh	Mostrim	Granard
Edgeworthstown	283	Ardagh	Mostrim	Granard
Elfeet (Adamson)	188	Rathcline	Cashel	Ballymahon
Elfeet (Burke)	87	Rathcline	Cashel	Ballymahon
Enaghan	760	Granard	Killoe	Granard
Enybegs	832	Longford	Killoe	Longford
Esker North	315	Longford	Killoe	Longford
Esker South	747	Longford	Killoe	Longford
Faghey	131	Longford	Clongesh	Longford
Fardrumman	823	Longford	Killoe	Longford
Farmullagh	586	Longford	Killoe	Granard
Farnagh	213	Ardagh	Ballymacormick	Longford
Farraghroe	463	Longford	Killoe	Longford
Farranakill	20	Shrule	Taghsheenod	Ballymahon
Farranyoogan	202	Ardagh	Ballymacormick	Longford
Feraghfad	722	Ardagh	Ballymacormick	Longford
Ferskill	532	Granard	Granard	Granard
Fihoges	99	Longford	Clongesh	Longford
Finnaragh	183	Ardagh	Ardagh	Longford
Finns	87	Moydow	Taghsheenod	Ballymahon
Firmount	160	Granard	Clonbroney	Granard
Fohoragh	789	Granard	Killoe	Granard
Forgney	887	Shrule	Forgney	Ballymahon
Formoyle (Farrell)	226	Rathcline	Rathcline	Longford
Formoyle (Newcomen)	214	Rathcline	Rathcline	Longford
Forthill	565	Rathcline	Cashel	Ballymahon
Fortmill and Moyra	168	Ardagh	Ardagh	Longford
Fortwilliam	195	Rathcline	Cashel	Ballymahon
Fostragh	617	Longford	Killoe	Longford
Foxhall	297	Ardagh	Rathreagh	Ballymahon
Foxhall Glebe	32	Ardagh	Rathreagh	Ballymahon
Foygh	410	Rathcline	Kilcommock	Ballymahon
France	126	Granard	Clonbroney	Granard
Freaghmeen	137	Ardagh	Street	Granard
Freehalman	119	Ardagh	Templemichael	Longford
Froghan	188	Ardagh	Street	Granard
Furze	81	Ardagh	Rathreagh	Ballymahon
Gaigue	952	Longford	Killoe	Longford
Gallid	252	Granard	Granard	Granard
Garranboy	65	Moydow	Moydow	Longford
Garrowhill	260	Longford	Clongesh	Longford
Garryandrew	148	Ardagh	Mostrim	Granard
Garrycam	331	Moydow	Kilglass	Ballymahon
Garryconnell	138	Ardagh	Ardagh	Longford
Garrynagh	94	Shrule	Noughaval	Ballymahon
Garvagh	368	Granard	Clonbroney	Granard
Garvagh	145	Ardagh	Ballymacormick	Longford
Garvary	231	Longford	Killoe	Longford
Gelshagh	539	Granard	Columbkille	Granard
Glack	107	Ardagh	Templemichael	Longford
Glannagh	243	Granard	Killoe	Granard
Glebe	80	Ardagh	Kilglass	Ballymahon
Glebe	57	Rathcline	Shrule	Ballymahon
Glebe	54	Rathcline	Cashel	Ballymahon
Glebe	52	Rathcline	Rathcline	Longford
Glebe	46	Shrule	Taghshinny	Ballymahon
Glebe	42	Longford	Killashee	Longford
Glebe	24	Ardagh	Ballymacormick	Longford
Glen	510	Ardagh	Ardagh	Longford
Glenmore	689	Longford	Killoe	Longford
Glenmore	494	Moydow	Kilcommock	Ballymahon
Glenoghil	520	Granard	Clonbroney	Granard
Gneeve	166	Ardagh	Mostrim	Granard
Goats Island	3	Rathcline	Rathcline	Longford
Gorteen	108	Granard	Clonbroney	Granard
Gorteenagloon	148	Moydow	Ballymacormick	Longford
Gorteenboy	163	Moydow	Ballymacormick	Longford
Gorteenclareen	644	Rathcline	Shrule	Ballymahon
Gorteengar	246	Rathcline	Rathcline	Longford
Gorteenorna	278	Longford	Clongesh	Longford
Gorteenrevagh	55	Granard	Clonbroney	Granard
Gowlan	532	Moydow	Ballymacormick	Longford
Graffoge	152	Moydow	Ardagh	Longford
Graffoge	124	Granard	Granard	Granard
Gragh	104	Moydow	Ballymacormick	Longford
**Granard**	Town	Granard	Granard	Granard
Granard	65	Granard	Granard	Granard
Granardkill	409	Granard	Granard	Granard
Grassyard	192	Granard	Granard	Granard
Greagh	267	Longford	Killoe	Longford
Greenhall Lower	102	Rathcline	Cashel	Ballymahon
Greenhall Upper	231	Rathcline	Cashel	Ballymahon
Greville	32	Granard	Granard	Granard
Grillagh	192	Moydow	Killashee	Longford
Grillagh	135	Ardagh	Ardagh	Longford
Halfcartron	48	Granard	Granard	Granard
Higginstown	144	Granard	Granard	Granard
Horse Island	1	Rathcline	Cashel	Ballymahon
Incharmcdermot	12	Rathcline	Rathcline	Longford
Inchcleraun	100	Rathcline	Cashel	Ballymahon
Inchenagh	69	Rathcline	Rathcline	Longford
Inchmore	17	Granard	Abbeylara	Granard
Inchmore	14	Granard	Columbkille	Granard
Island	238	Rathcline	Kilcommock	Ballymahon
Jasper Island	1	Granard	Columbkille	Granard
Keel	740	Moydow	Kilglass	Ballymahon
Keel	524	Shrule	Noughaval	Ballymahon
Keelbaun	68	Shrule	Noughaval	Ballymahon
Keelogalabaun	82	Moydow	Moydow	Longford
Keeloge	150	Moydow	Moydow	Ballymahon
Keelogenasause	124	Ardagh	Mostrim	Granard
Keeloges	170	Ardagh	Ardagh	Longford
**Keenagh**	Town	Rathcline	Kilcommock	Ballymahon
Keenagh	216	Rathcline	Kilcommock	Ballymahon
Kilbride	255	Granard	Abbeylara	Granard
Kilcommock Glebe	352	Rathcline	Kilcommock	Ballymahon
Kilcourcey	216	Ardagh	Mostrim	Granard
Kilcurry	578	Shrule	Taghshinny	Ballymahon
Kilderreen	74	Granard	Clonbroney	Granard
Kildordan	121	Shrule	Forgney	Ballymahon
Kilfintan	323	Ardagh	Street	Granard
Kilfintan Lower (or Crancam)	50	Ardagh	Street	Granard
Kilglass and Cloonagh	70	Ardagh	Kilglass	Ballymahon
**Killashee**	Town	Moydow	Killashee	Longford
Killashee and Aghakeeran	371	Moydow	Killashee	Longford
Killasona	543	Granard	Granard	Granard
Killeen	733	Ardagh	Rathreagh	Ballymahon
Killeen	676	Granard	Granard	Granard
Killeen	439	Longford	Clongesh	Longford
Killeenatruan	119	Longford	Killoe	Longford
Killeenboy	206	Shrule	Abbeyshrule	Ballymahon
Killeendowd	201	Moydow	Taghsheenod	Ballymahon
Killeeny	276	Moydow	Killashee	Longford
Killeter	339	Longford	Killoe	Longford
Killinawas	174	Granard	Granard	Granard
Killinbore	171	Shrule	Taghshinny	Ballymahon
Killinlastra	94	Ardagh	Ardagh	Longford
Killinure	194	Rathcline	Rathcline	Longford
Killoe Glebe	129	Longford	Killoe	Longford
Killyfad	200	Longford	Killoe	Longford
Kilmacannon	280	Longford	Clongesh	Longford
Kilmahon	355	Longford	Killoe	Longford
Kilmakinlan	163	Moydow	Kilcommock	Ballymahon
Kilmore	581	Granard	Columbkille	Granard
Kilmore Lower	379	Longford	Clongesh	Longford
Kilmore Upper	389	Longford	Clongesh	Longford
Kilmoyle	297	Longford	Killoe	Longford
Kilnacarrow	244	Longford	Killoe	Longford
Kilnacarrow	194	Rathcline	Rathcline	Longford
Kilnacarrow	164	Shrule	Taghshinny	Ballymahon
Kilnasavoge	66	Ardagh	Templemichael	Longford
Kilnashee	273	Longford	Killoe	Longford
Kilsallagh	538	Ardagh	Mostrim	Granard
Kilshruley	256	Granard	Clonbroney	Granard
Kiltybegs	245	Ardagh	Templemichael	Longford
Kiltyclogh	264	Granard	Clonbroney	Granard
Kiltycon	402	Longford	Killoe	Longford
Kiltycreevagh	944	Longford	Killoe	Longford
Kiltykeary	68	Granard	Clonbroney	Granard
Kiltyreher	223	Longford	Templemichael	Longford
Kiltyreher	188	Longford	Killoe	Longford
Kinard	434	Ardagh	Rathreagh	Ballymahon
King's Island	17	Rathcline	Cashel	Ballymahon
Kinkillew	64	Granard	Granard	Granard
Knappoge	621	Longford	Killashee	Longford
Knappoge	177	Shrule	Kilcommock	Ballymahon
Knock	107	Rathcline	Rathcline	Longford
Knockagh	262	Shrule	Taghshinny	Ballymahon
Knockagowny	70	Moydow	Ballymacormick	Longford
Knockahaw	207	Ardagh	Templemichael	Longford
Knockanbaun (or Whitehill)	563	Granard	Clonbroney	Granard
Knockanboy	75	Ardagh	Ballymacormick	Longford
Knockatarry Brickeens	70	Moydow	Ballymacormick	Longford
Knockatarry Poynton	167	Moydow	Ballymacormick	Longford
Knockavegan	244	Moydow	Kilcommock	Ballymahon
Knockawalky	70	Longford	Templemichael	Longford
Knockloughlin	269	Longford	Templemichael	Longford
Knockmartin	132	Longford	Clongesh	Longford
Knockmoody	85	Granard	Clonbroney	Granard
Knocknaskea	75	Moydow	Kilglass	Ballymahon
Lackan	441	Ardagh	Mostrim	Granard
Laghlooney	137	Moydow	Kilcommock	Ballymahon
Lamagh	310	Longford	Clongesh	Longford
**Lanesborough**	Town	Rathcline	Rathcline	Longford
Lanesborough	32	Rathcline	Rathcline	Longford
Laragh	155	Rathcline	Shrule	Ballymahon
Larkfield	674	Granard	Columbkille	Granard
Laughil	245	Rathcline	Kilcommock	Ballymahon
Laughil	112	Ardagh	Ardagh	Longford
Laughil (Adair)	101	Granard	Clonbroney	Granard
Laughil (Edgeworth)	171	Granard	Clonbroney	Granard
Leab	112	Rathcline	Cashel	Ballymahon
Lechurragh	208	Ardagh	Street	Granard
Ledwithstown	579	Rathcline	Kilcommock	Ballymahon
Ledwithstown	96	Rathcline	Shrule	Ballymahon
Legan	277	Shrule	Kilglass	Ballymahon
Leggagh	836	Longford	Killoe	Longford
Lehery	891	Rathcline	Rathcline	Longford
Leitrim	498	Granard	Granard	Granard
Leitrim	447	Longford	Clongesh	Longford
Leitrim	123	Granard	Clonbroney	Granard
Leitrim (or Corbaun)	466	Granard	Columbkille	Granard
Lenaboy	138	Ardagh	Ardagh	Longford
Lettergeeragh	186	Longford	Killoe	Longford
Lettergonnell	651	Longford	Killoe	Longford
Lettergullion	494	Longford	Killoe	Longford
Leveran Island	1	Rathcline	Cashel	Ballymahon
Lightfield	64	Rathcline	Cashel	Ballymahon
Lisaquill	169	Shrule	Kilglass	Ballymahon
Lisbrack	45	Longford	Clongesh	Longford
Lisbrack	42	Longford	Templemichael	Longford
Liscahill	241	Ardagh	Mostrim	Granard
Liscormick	188	Shrule	Agharra	Ballymahon
Lisdreenagh	192	Ardagh	Kilglass	Longford
Lisduff	343	Ardagh	Ballymacormick	Longford
Lisduff	195	Granard	Clonbroney	Granard
Lisduff	67	Ardagh	Ardagh	Longford
Lisduff	47	Rathcline	Rathcline	Longford
Lisduff (Montgomery)	355	Moydow	Ardagh	Longford
Lisfarrell	319	Ardagh	Templemichael	Longford
Lisglassock	113	Shrule	Kilcommock	Ballymahon
Lisgurry	98	Moydow	Moydow	Longford
Lislea	495	Moydow	Kilcommock	Ballymahon
Lislea	425	Granard	Clonbroney	Granard
Lislom	220	Shrule	Kilcommock	Ballymahon
Lismacmanus	140	Rathcline	Rathcline	Longford
Lismacmurrogh	123	Shrule	Kilcommock	Ballymahon
Lismagawley	42	Rathcline	Cashel	Ballymahon
Lismagawley Bog	25	Rathcline	Cashel	Ballymahon
Lismagawley Meadow	32	Rathcline	Cashel	Ballymahon
Lismagoneen	121	Granard	Clonbroney	Granard
Lismore	155	Longford	Clongesh	Longford
Lismoy	459	Longford	Clongesh	Longford
Lisnabo	123	Longford	Clongesh	Longford
Lisnacreevy	268	Moydow	Taghsheenod	Ballymahon
Lisnacush	269	Rathcline	Rathcline	Longford
Lisnageeragh	429	Ardagh	Mostrim	Granard
Lisnagrish	442	Ardagh	Mostrim	Granard
Lisnamuck	265	Ardagh	Templemichael	Longford
Lisnanagh	630	Granard	Killoe	Granard
Lisnaneane	87	Granard	Granard	Granard
Lisraghtigan	140	Granard	Clonbroney	Granard
Lisraherty	144	Granard	Killoe	Granard
Lisrevagh	290	Rathcline	Rathcline	Longford
Lisryan	411	Ardagh	Street	Granard
Lissagernal	224	Longford	Clongesh	Longford
Lissaghanedan	199	Ardagh	Ardagh	Longford
Lissakit	145	Moydow	Taghsheenod	Ballymahon
Lissameen	303	Granard	Clonbroney	Granard
Lissanisky	92	Ardagh	Ardagh	Longford
Lissanisky	55	Rathcline	Shrule	Ballymahon
Lissanore	234	Ardagh	Mostrim	Granard
Lissanure	556	Ardagh	Mostrim	Granard
Lissanurlan	180	Longford	Templemichael	Longford
Lissard	258	Granard	Clonbroney	Granard
Lissardowlan	153	Ardagh	Templemichael	Longford
Lissavaddy	110	Longford	Killoe	Longford
Lissawarriff	336	Shrule	Agharra	Ballymahon
Lissawly (or St. Albans)	91	Rathcline	Rathcline	Longford
Listobit	267	Shrule	Taghshinny	Ballymahon
Listraghee	166	Granard	Clonbroney	Granard
Little Island	1	Rathcline	Rathcline	Longford
Long Island	2	Rathcline	Cashel	Ballymahon
Longfield	373	Ardagh	Mostrim	Granard
**Longford**	Town	Ardagh	Templemichael	Longford
**Longford**	Town	Longford	Templemichael	Longford
Loughan	168	Moydow	Taghsheenod	Ballymahon
Loughfarm	122	Rathcline	Cashel	Ballymahon
Loughsheedan	103	Moydow	Taghsheenod	Ballymahon
Lurgan	73	Ardagh	Rathreagh	Ballymahon
Lyanmore	168	Ardagh	Ardagh	Longford
Lyneen	424	Moydow	Killashee	Ballymahon
Magheraveen	302	Rathcline	Rathcline	Longford
Meelick	63	Moydow	Ballymacormick	Longford
Meeltanagh	124	Ardagh	Ardagh	Longford
Meeltanagh	99	Moydow	Moydow	Longford
Melkagh	183	Longford	Killoe	Longford
Melkernagh	81	Granard	Granard	Granard
Middleton	382	Moydow	Killashee	Longford
Minard	159	Longford	Clongesh	Longford
Moatavally	231	Ardagh	Street	Granard
Moatfarrell	769	Granard	Clonbroney	Granard
Moatfield	18	Granard	Granard	Granard
Molly	513	Granard	Columbkille	Granard
Mollyglass	127	Granard	Columbkille	Granard
Mollyroe	66	Moydow	Moydow	Longford
Monadarragh	454	Ardagh	Mostrim	Granard
Monaduff	263	Longford	Killoe	Longford
Monascallaghan	286	Moydow	Moydow	Longford
Moneyfad	61	Rathcline	Shrule	Ballymahon
Moneyhoolaghan	122	Ardagh	Street	Granard
Moneylagan	236	Longford	Clongesh	Longford
Moor	138	Ardagh	Ardagh	Longford
Mornin	847	Moydow	Taghsheenod	Ballymahon
Mosstown	491	Rathcline	Kilcommock	Ballymahon
Mosstown	183	Moydow	Kilcommock	Ballymahon
Mountdavis	528	Rathcline	Rathcline	Longford
Mountjessop	260	Moydow	Moydow	Longford
Moydow Glebe	94	Moydow	Moydow	Longford
Moygh	350	Rathcline	Shrule	Ballymahon
Moygh	125	Moydow	Killashee	Longford
Moyne	502	Granard	Killoe	Longford
Moyra and Fortmill	168	Ardagh	Ardagh	Longford
Muckerstaff	351	Granard	Granard	Granard
Muckinish	27	Rathcline	Cashel	Ballymahon
Mucknagh	265	Longford	Killoe	Longford
Mullagh	196	Longford	Templemichael	Longford
Mullagh Bog	107	Longford	Templemichael	Longford
Mullaghavorneen	264	Ardagh	Ballymacormick	Longford
Mullawornia	245	Rathcline	Shrule	Ballymahon
Mullingee	55	Granard	Granard	Granard
Mullinroe	425	Granard	Columbkille	Granard
Mullolagher	265	Longford	Templemichael	Longford
Nappagh	255	Moydow	Ardagh	Longford
Newcastle	530	Shrule	Forgney	Ballymahon
Newpark	470	Rathcline	Cashel	Ballymahon
Newport	387	Ardagh	Rathreagh	Ballymahon
Newtown	181	Moydow	Ballymacormick	Longford
Newtown	102	Ardagh	Rathreagh	Ballymahon
Newtown	101	Moydow	Killashee	Longford
**Newtown Forbes**	Town	Longford	Clongesh	Longford
Newtownbond	385	Granard	Killoe	Granard
Newtownflanigan	134	Rathcline	Cashel	Ballymahon
Nut Island	15	Rathcline	Cashel	Ballymahon
Oghil	761	Longford	Killoe	Longford
Oldtown	325	Ardagh	Ardagh	Longford
Pallas Beg	222	Shrule	Forgney	Ballymahon
Pallas More	306	Shrule	Forgney	Ballymahon
Parkplace	164	Moydow	Taghsheenod	Ballymahon
Polladooey	240	Granard	Columbkille	Granard
Pollagh	274	Rathcline	Cashel	Ballymahon
Portanure	356	Rathcline	Cashel	Ballymahon
Portanure Bog	54	Rathcline	Cashel	Ballymahon
Priests Island	4	Rathcline	Cashel	Ballymahon
Prucklish	266	Longford	Clongesh	Longford
Prucklishtown	178	Granard	Clonbroney	Granard
Queensland	93	Ardagh	Street	Granard
Rabbit Park	223	Ardagh	Ardagh	Longford
Ranaghan	277	Granard	Abbeylara	Granard
Ranaghanbaun	40	Granard	Abbeylara	Granard
Rappareehill	671	Moydow	Killashee	Longford
Rath	566	Shrule	Forgney	Ballymahon
Ratharney	321	Shrule	Abbeyshrule	Ballymahon
Rathbrackan	305	Granard	Abbeylara	Granard
Rathcline	1,168	Rathcline	Rathcline	Longford
Rathcor	164	Granard	Granard	Granard
Rathcronan	201	Granard	Granard	Granard
Rathmore	849	Shrule	Noughaval	Ballymahon
Rathmore	649	Granard	Columbkille	Longford
Rathsallagh	186	Shrule	Abbeyshrule	Ballymahon
Rathvaldron	142	Ardagh	Ardagh	Longford
Red Island	1	Rathcline	Cashel	Ballymahon
Rhine	781	Longford	Killoe	Longford
Richfort (or Cooleeshil)	289	Ardagh	Ardagh	Longford
Rincoolagh	662	Granard	Granard	Granard
Ringowny	727	Ardagh	Mostrim	Granard
Rinn and Clogher	261	Longford	Killashee	Longford
Rinnenny	138	Ardagh	Mostrim	Granard
Rinroe	263	Granard	Granard	Granard
Rinvanny	258	Ardagh	Clonbroney	Granard
Robinstown	159	Granard	Granard	Granard
Rockpeyton	64	Ardagh	Kilglass	Ballymahon
Roos	250	Granard	Clonbroney	Granard
Rosduff	743	Granard	Columbkille	Granard
Rossan	291	Granard	Abbeylara	Granard
Saintjohnstown (or Ballinalee)	161	Granard	Clonbroney	Granard
Saints Island	205	Rathcline	Cashel	Ballymahon
Sallow Island	1	Longford	Clongesh	Longford
Sand Island	5	Rathcline	Cashel	Ballymahon
School Land	96	Granard	Clonbroney	Granard
Screeboge	200	Shrule	Taghsheenod	Ballymahon
Shanmullagh	783	Longford	Killoe	Longford
Shantum	179	Ardagh	Mostrim	Granard
Sharvoge	242	Moydow	Killashee	Longford
Sheeroe	41	Shrule	Agharra	Ballymahon
Sheeroe	29	Granard	Clonbroney	Granard
Shrule	55	Rathcline	Shrule	Ballymahon
Sleehaun	425	Ardagh	Rathreagh	Ballymahon
Sleehaun (Sankey)	95	Ardagh	Rathreagh	Ballymahon
Slieve	332	Longford	Killashee	Longford
Smear	1,072	Granard	Columbkille	Granard
Smithfield	104	Ardagh	Kilglass	Ballymahon
Snugborough	36	Moydow	Kilcommock	Ballymahon
Sonnagh	526	Granard	Columbkille	Granard
Soran	1,204	Longford	Killoe	Longford
Springtown	665	Granard	Granard	Granard
Sragarrow	52	Longford	Clongesh	Longford
St Albans (or Lissawly)	91	Rathcline	Rathcline	Longford
St Annes Glebe	86	Longford	Clongesh	Longford
Stonepark	195	Ardagh	Ballymacormick	Longford
Stonepark	71	Moydow	Kilcommock	Ballymahon
Streamstown	92	Rathcline	Cashel	Ballymahon
Streamstown	89	Shrule	Taghshinny	Ballymahon
Swan Island	1	Granard	Columbkille	Granard
Taghsheenod Glebe	47	Moydow	Taghsheenod	Ballymahon
Taghshinny	372	Shrule	Taghshinny	Ballymahon
Tawnagh	482	Longford	Killoe	Longford
Teemore	64	Granard	Granard	Granard
Templemichael Glebe	163	Ardagh	Templemichael	Longford
Templeton Glebe	379	Moydow	Killashee	Longford
Tennalick	546	Shrule	Taghshinny	Ballymahon
Tennalough	316	Shrule	Agharra	Ballymahon
Tennyphobble	43	Granard	Granard	Granard
Tinnynarr	416	Ardagh	Mostrim	Granard
Tipper	120	Rathcline	Cashel	Ballymahon
Tipper	80	Shrule	Kilcommock	Ballymahon
Tirlickeen	852	Rathcline	Shrule	Ballymahon
Tober	256	Granard	Abbeylara	Granard
Toberfelim	166	Granard	Granard	Granard
Tomisky	273	Longford	Mohill	Longford
Toneen	215	Moydow	Moydow	Longford
Toneen	181	Granard	Granard	Granard
Tonymore North	211	Granard	Abbeylara	Granard
Tonymore South	463	Granard	Abbeylara	Granard
Tonywardan	559	Granard	Granard	Granard
Toome	557	Granard	Columbkille	Granard
Toome	307	Shrule	Taghshinny	Ballymahon
Toorfin	112	Ardagh	Templemichael	Longford
Torboy	350	Moydow	Taghsheenod	Ballymahon
Townparks	402	Ardagh	Templemichael	Longford
Townparks	137	Longford	Clongesh	Longford
Treanboy	76	Moydow	Killashee	Longford
Treel	192	Ardagh	Ardagh	Longford
Treel	87	Longford	Clongesh	Longford
Treel	59	Ardagh	Kilglass	Ballymahon
Trillickacurry	369	Moydow	Ballymacormick	Longford
Trillickatemple	236	Moydow	Ballymacormick	Longford
Tromra	423	Granard	Granard	Granard
Tully	487	Granard	Granard	Granard
Tully	376	Longford	Clongesh	Longford
Tully	207	Shrule	Kilglass	Ballymahon
Tullybaun	74	Granard	Clonbroney	Granard
Tullyvrane	337	Rathcline	Rathcline	Longford
Tureen	285	Rathcline	Rathcline	Longford
Twentyacres	69	Ardagh	Templemichael	Longford
Twentyacres	16	Ardagh	Ardagh	Longford
Vicarsfield Glebe	26	Granard	Clonbroney	Granard
Vicarstown	99	Shrule	Agharra	Ballymahon
White Island	12	Granard	Killoe	Granard
White Island	3	Granard	Columbkille	Granard
Whitehill (or Knockanbaun)	563	Granard	Clonbroney	Granard
Whiterock	226	Ardagh	Templemichael	Longford
Willsbrook	178	Granard	Granard	Granard
Woodlawn	89	Moydow	Killashee	Longford
