= Robert Gorges (priest) =

Irish Anglican priest

Robert Gorges was an Anglican priest in Ireland during the second half of the 18th century.

Gorges was educated at Trinity College, Dublin. He was the incumbent at Termonfeckin then Dean of Kilmacduagh from 1771 until his death in 1802.
