= Dean of Waterford =

Dean of Christ Church Cathedral, Waterford in Ireland

The Dean of Waterford in the United Dioceses of Cashel and Ossory in the Church of Ireland is the dean of Christ Church Cathedral, Waterford.

== List of deans of Waterford ==
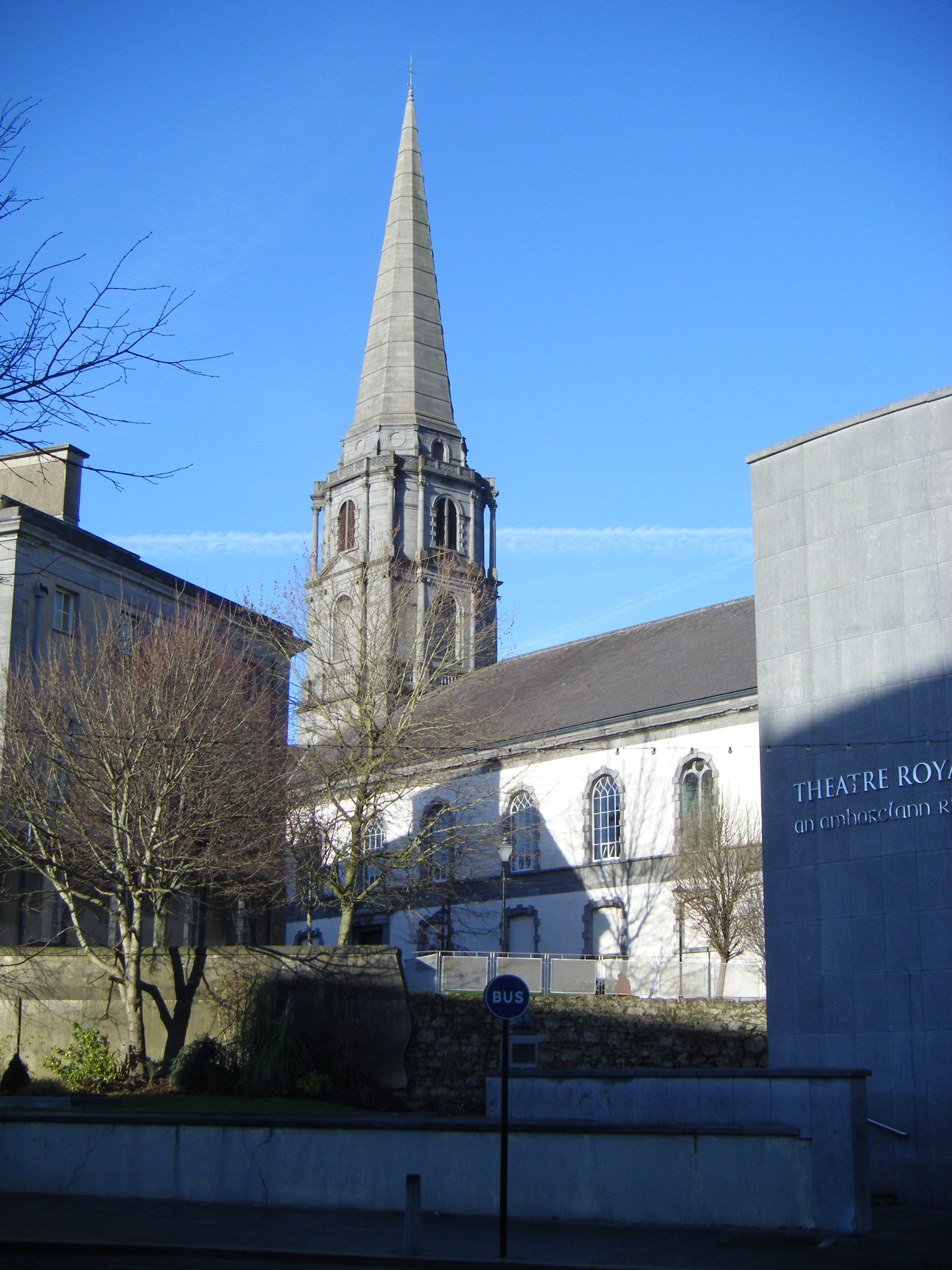
Waterford Cathedral

- Gilbert: 1212
- William Wace: 12–1223 (afterwards Bishop of Waterford)
- Thomas: c.1227
- Philip: 12–1252 (afterwards Bishop of Waterford)
- Richard de Haverbergan 1225
- William 1271
- Walter de Fulburn: 1281– 1286 (afterwards Bishop of Waterford)
- David le Wayles: 1300
- Nicholas Welifed: 13–1322 (afterwards Bishop of Waterford)
- Richard Hauceys: 1326
- Adam Lok: 13-
- Nicholas Disaard 13-
- Walter Reve: 1351
- Lucas de Londres: 1372
- 1379 Jo. Reder: 1379
- Walter de Ludlow: 1395
- William Whyte: 1396
- John Rede: 1404
- Edward (Edmond) Flemyng: 1421
- Robert Howe: 1426
- Edward (Edmond) Flemyng: 14-(1435)
- Alan Penbroke (Pembroke): 1435
- John Collyn: 1459
- Thomas Prendergast: 1454
- Robert Brown (Bronn): 1481
- Nicholas Whyt: 1500
- Richard (or Robert) Lombard: 1522–1547
- Patrick Walsh: 1547–1566 (made Bishop of Waterford and Lismore in 1551, retaining deanery in commendam until 1566)
- Peter White: 1566–1570 (dispossessed for nonconformity)
- David Cleere: 1570 – ?
- John Lane: 1602
- Richard Boyle: 1603–1620 (also Archdeacon of Limerick and Dean of Tuam and afterwards Bishop of Cork, Cloyne and Ross from 1620)
- Henry Sutton: 1621
- Anthony Martin: 1622/3
- Richard Jones: 1625 (afterwards Dean of Elphin in 1634)
- Thomas Gray: 1634–1635 (afterwards Dean of Ardfert)
- James Margetson: 1635–1637 (afterwards Dean of Derry)
- Edward Parry: 1637/8–1640 (afterwards Dean of Lismore)
- Gervase Thorp: 1640
- Thomas Potter:1661/2
- Thomas Ledisham: 1666
- Daniel Burston: 1671
- Arthur Stanhope: 1678 (also Archdeacon of Lismore)
- Thomas Wallis: 1685–1689 (afterwards Dean of Derry)
- John Dalton: 1691/2
- John Eeles: 1697 (also Archdeacon of Lismore)
- Hugh Bolton: 1722/3–1758
- Cutts Harman: 1759–1784
- Christopher Butson: 1784–1804 (afterwards Bishop of Clonfert and Kilmacduagh)
- Hon. William Montgomery Cole: 1804–1804 (d. 1804)
- Ussher Lee: 1804–1850
- Thomas Stewart Townsend: 1850 (afterwards Bishop of Meath)
- Edward Newenham Hoare: 1850–1877
- John Morgan: 1877–1903
- Henry Monck Mason Hackett: 1904–1913
- Maurice William Day: 1913–1916
- Robert Miller: 1916–1919 (afterwards Bishop of Cashel and Waterford)
- George Samuel Mayers: 1919-1936
- Leslie Creery Stevenson: 1937-1950
- Noble Holton Hamilton: 1950-1967
- Fergus William Day: 1967-1979 (died 1996)
- John Andrew Brian Mayne: 1980-1984
- John Robert Winder Neill: 1984-1986
- William Benjamin Alan Neill: 1986-1997
- Peter Francis Barrett: 1998–2003 (afterwards Bishop of Cashel and Ossory)
- Trevor Rashleigh Lester: 2003–2011
- Maria Patricia Jansson: 2011–2021
- Bruce John Hayes: 2022–present
