= Walter Kirwan =

Irish priest

Walter Blake Kirwan (1754–1805) was an Irish priest of the Church of Ireland and a noted preacher.

Born in Gort, County Galway in 1754 and raised a Roman Catholic, he studied in the Jesuit school St. Omer's College, intending to study for the priesthood. Aged 17 he went to St Croix, in the West Indies, then a Danish colony, where his father's cousin was a wealthy businessman. Kirwan reportedly disagreed with slavery and did not like the climate so he returned to Europe.

On the advice of his maternal uncle, the Roman Catholic Primate of Ireland, Archbishop Anthony Blake he went to the University of Louvain, completing his studies for the priesthood with distinction, and following ordination in 1777, he held the chair of Moral and Natural Philosophy. After leaving Louvain he went to London.

In 1785 Kirwn cease to operate as a Catholic priest, and in 1787 joined the established church (Anglican) and was appointed to St. Peter's Church, Aungier Street, Dublin. He became a canon of St Patrick's Cathedral, Dublin as the prebend of Howth, Co. Dublin, and rector of Church of St Nicholas Without, Dublin (Church of Ireland). In 1800 he was appointed Dean of Killala.

In 1791, along with other establishment figures, he was the subject of the satirical pen of "Pat. Pindar" (Henrietta Battier) who, in Ireland, enjoyed the patronage of leading members of the Patriot party.

Kirwan married Wilhelmina Richards on 22 September 1798. They had two sons and two daughters. His son Anthony La Touche Kirwan also became an Anglican priest. He died aged 51, on 27 October 1805 at his home in Mount Pleasant, Dublin.

Kirwan House, an orphanage for girls, was named in his honour due to his fundraising preaching on their behalf. In 1816 a volume of his sermons was published.

Church of Ireland titles
| Preceded by Thomas Thompson | Dean of Killala; 1800–1805 | Succeeded by Edward Burton |
