= John Morgan (dean of Waterford) =

John Morgan (6 July 1819 – 4 January 1904) was a priest of the Church of Ireland, Dean of Waterford from 1877 to 1903. He was both Dean and Rector of Christ Church Cathedral, Waterford, retiring from ministerial work as Dean about two years before his death.

== Life ==
Morgan was educated at Trinity College, Dublin and was ordained in 1843. He was curate at St Patrick, Waterford. From 1858 to 1871 he was Vicar of Cahir and curate of Killardry.

Created Rector of Lismore, County Waterford in 1871, Morgan was appointed Dean of Waterford in 1877. In 1900 he resigned because of old age as incumbent of Trinity parish, Waterford, and also as canon of St Patrick's Cathedral, Dublin with a prebend.

Church of Ireland titles
Preceded by Edward Newenham Hoare	Dean of Waterford; 1877–1903	Succeeded by Henry Monck Mason Hackett
