= Stephen Handcock =

Irish Anglican priest

Stephen Handcock (1657 - 1719) was an Anglican priest in Ireland during the late 17th and early 18th centuries.

Handcock was born in County Meath and educated at Trinity College, Dublin. He was appointed Dean of Clonmacnoise in 1689 and Dean of Kilmacduagh in 1700, a post he held until his death.
