= Trevor Lester =

Dean of Waterford from 2003 to 2011

Trevor Rashleigh Lester was Dean of Waterford from 2003 until 2011.

Lester was born in 1950. He was educated at the Church of Ireland Theological Institute and ordained in 1990. After curacies in Marmullane and Kilkenny he was the incumbent at Abbeystrewry until his appointment as Dean.
