= Charles Northcott =

Irish Anglican priest

Charles Northcott was an Anglican priest in Ireland during the late 18th century.

Richardson was born in County Tyrone and educated at Trinity College, Dublin. He was Dean of Kilmacduagh from 1719 until his death in 1730.
