= Richard Hood (priest) =

Richard Hood (4 July 1769 – 20 November 1836) was an Anglican priest in Ireland during the first decades of the 19th century.

Hood was born in Queen's County (now Laois) and educated at Trinity College, Dublin. He was Rector of Gort then Dean of Kilmacduagh from 1823 until his death.
