= Cloontaghmore =

Townland in County Longford, Ireland

Coordinates: 53.6368°N 7.8943°W

Cloontaghmore or Cloontamore (Irish: Cluainte Móra, meaning 'big pastures') is a townland in the south of County Longford, in Ireland. It is located on the R398 regional road. The townland is in the electoral division of Mountdavis and has an area of approximately 2.3 square kilometres (0.89 sq mi). As of the 2011 census, Cloontamore townland had a population of 30 people. The local national (primary) school, Cloontagh National School, had an enrollment of 15 pupils in 2024. The Record of Monuments and Places for County Longford records a ringfort, a fulacht fiadh and a number of trackway (togher) sites in the townland.
