= Henry Hackett =

Henry Monck Mason Hackett (1 March 1849-24 December 1933) was Dean of Waterford from 1903 until 1913.

Hackett was educated at Trinity College, Dublin and ordained in 1875. After a curacy in Banbridge he was a CMS Missionary in Benares from 1877 to 1881; and was at Allahabad from 1881 to 1886. He was the Minister of Christ Church, Richmond, Surrey from 1886 to 1888; and of Christ Church, Hampstead from 1892 to 1894. He was Missionary-Principal of St Paul’s Divinity School, Allahabad from 1892 to 1896; and Principal of Montreal Diocesan Theological College from 1898 until his appointment as Dean. After his years in Waterford he was the Vicar of St Peter, Belsize Park from 1913 to 1929.

Church of Ireland titles
Preceded by John Morgan	Dean of Waterford; 1903–1913	Succeeded by Maurice William Day
