= John O'Neil (priest) =

John Thomas O'Neil was an Irish Anglican priest.

Educated at Trinity College, Dublin, he was the Chancellor of Killaloe Cathedral before his appointment as Dean of Kilmacduagh in 1837. He resigned the following year.
