= Henry O'Hara =

Church of Ireland bishop

Henry Stewart O’Hara (6 September 1843 – 11 December 1923) was an eminent Church of Ireland bishop in the late 19th and early 20th centuries.

== Church appointments ==
O’Hara was born on 6 September 1843 into an ecclesiastical family. His father was Rector of Coleraine, a post he, Henry, was to hold from 1869 to 1894. Educated at Leicester Collegiate School and Trinity College, Dublin, he was ordained in 1867. While based in Coleraine, he was Chancellor of Connor Cathedral from 1884 to 1898. In 1894 he was appointed Vicar of Belfast. In 1897 he became a Canon of St Patrick's Cathedral, Dublin, and in 1899 he became the first dean of Belfast. In a meeting of the Bench of Bishops of the Church of Ireland on 6 February 1900, he was elected Bishop of Cashel, Emly, Waterford and Lismore, and he was consecrated bishop by the Archbishop of Dublin at St Patrick's Cathedral, Dublin on 24 February 1900. He was formally installed at Christ Church Cathedral, Waterford, on 17 March 1900. He served as such until his retirement in 1919.

Following his consecration as bishop, he received the degrees of Bachelor and Doctor in Sacra Theologia from Trinity College, Dublin in February 1900.

== Biography ==
O'Hara married Hatton Thomasina Scott, eldest daughter of Thomas Scott of Willsboro (1783–1872) and his third wife Katharine Elizabeth Richardson, daughter of the Rev. Thomas Richardson of Somerset, co. Londonderry. He died on 11 December 1923.

Church of Ireland titles
Preceded by Inaugural appointment	Dean of Belfast; 1894–1899	Succeeded by Charles Frederick D'Arcy
Preceded by Maurice FitzGerald Day	Bishop of Cashel, Emly, Waterford and Lismore; 1900–1919	Succeeded by Robert Miller
