= Ballinrooey =

Townland in County Longford, Ireland

Coordinates: 53°48′42″N 7°33′40″W

- Townland
- Interactive map of Ballinrooey
- Country: Ireland
- Province: Leinster
- County: County Longford

Ballinrooey (Irish: Baile an Rú) is a small townland in the barony of Granard and the civil parish of Abbeylara in County Longford, Ireland. Ballinrooey, which has an area of approximately 2 square kilometres (0.8 sq mi), had a population of 32 as of the 2011 census. St. Joseph's Church, Purth, which is located in the townland, is in the ecclesiastical parish of Colmcille in the Roman Catholic Diocese of Ardagh and Clonmacnoise.
