= Robert Miller (Irish bishop) =

Irish bishop

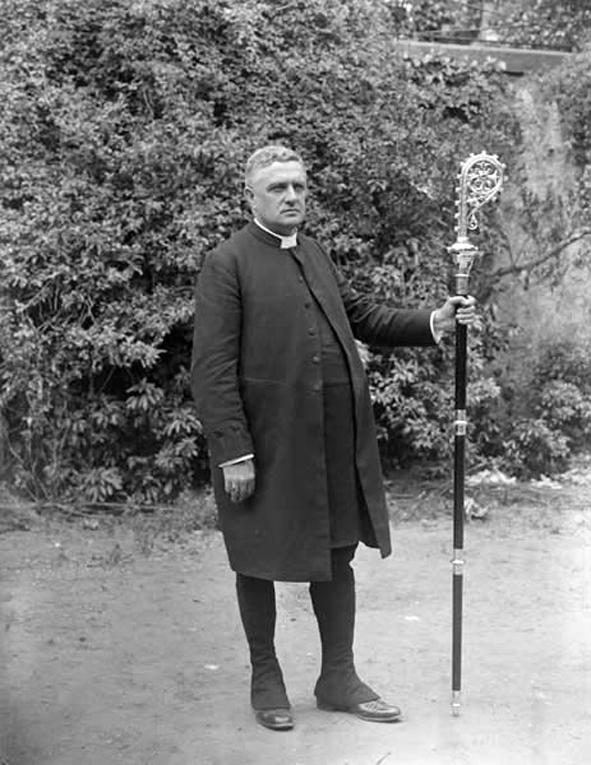
Miller on 22 June 1925

Robert Miller (1866–1931) was a Church of Ireland bishop in the first half of the 20th century.

Miller was educated at Trinity College, Dublin and ordained for Christ Church Derry in 1892. He was Rector of Donegal from 1894 to 1900. After a further incumbency at Raphoe he was Secretary of the Incorporated Society for Promoting Protestant Schools in Ireland until 1916.

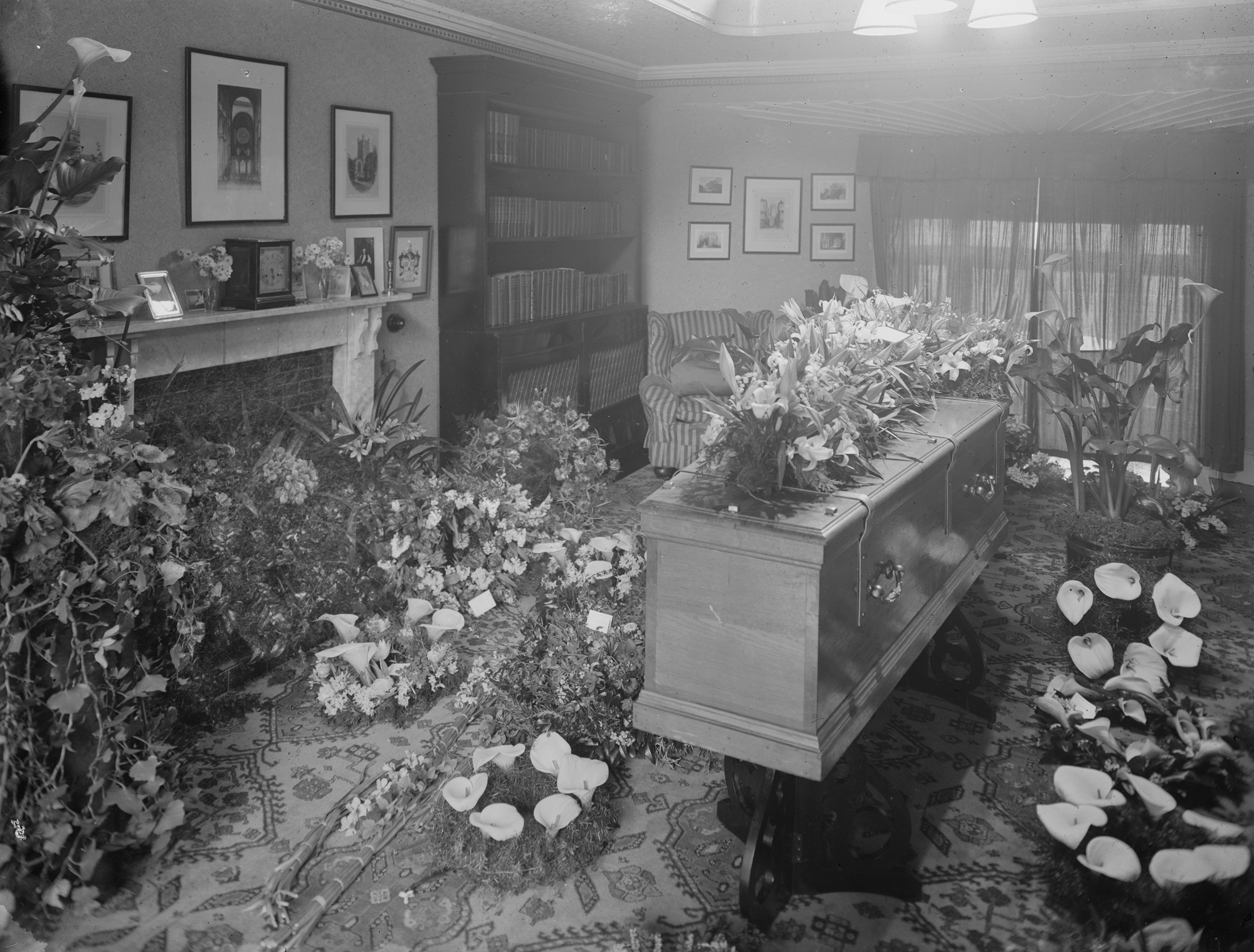
The Bishop's funeral in 1931.

He was Dean of Waterford from then until 1919, when he became Bishop of Cashel, Emly, Waterford and Lismore- a post he held until his death on 13 March 1931.

He accompanied the Church of Ireland Archbishop of Dublin John Gregg and Protestant businessman Sir William Goulding "to see Michael Collins in May 1922, following the murders of thirteen Protestants in the Bandon valley, to ask whether the Protestant minority should stay on. Collins 'assured them that the government would maintain civil and religious liberty'."

Coat of arms of Robert Miller

Notes
Granted 24 September 1919 by George James Burtchaell, Deputy Ulster King of Arms.
Crest
Out of waves of the sea a sextet erect with the first and second fingers pointing upwards all Proper.
Torse
Of the colours.
Escutcheon
Argent on a cross moline Azure between two annulets in chief Gules a cross pattee Or.
Motto
Manent Optima Coelo

Church of Ireland titles
Preceded by Henry Stewart O'Hara	Bishop of Cashel, Emly, Waterford and Lismore; 1919–1931	Succeeded by John Frederick McNeice
