= William Nethercoat =

Irish Anglican priest

William Nethercoat was an Anglican priest in Ireland.

Nethrcoat was educated at Trinity College Dublin. He was the incumbent at Beagh then Dean of Kilmacduagh from 1753 until his death in 1771.
