= Maurice Day (bishop of Cashel and Waterford) =

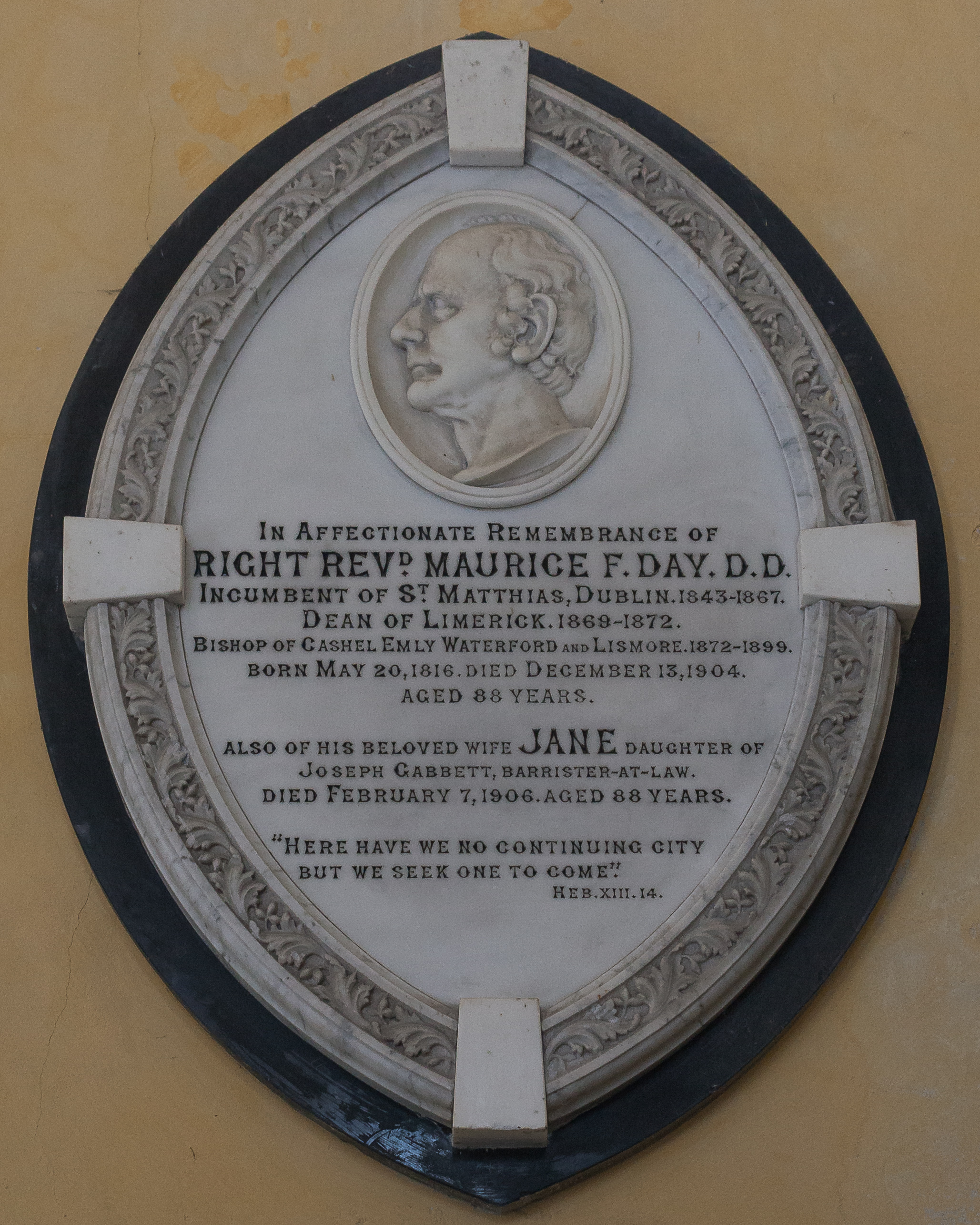
Monument to Maurice F. Day in Christ Church Cathedral, Waterford

Maurice FitzGerald Day (20 May 1816 – 13 December 1904) was a Church of Ireland bishop in the last quarter of the 19th century.

Day was born at Kiltallagh, County Kerry, to J. Day, rector of Kiltallagh, and his wife Arabella, daughter of Sir William Godfrey. He was educated at Clonmel Endowed School and Trinity College, Dublin and ordained in 1840. He established and was the incumbent of St. Matthias' Church, Hatch Street, Dublin from 1843 to 1868 when he became Dean of Limerick. He was Bishop of Cashel, Emly, Waterford and Lismore from 1872 until his retirement in 1899. He died on 13 December 1904, in Greystones, County Wicklow.

Day married Jane (Gabbett) Day on 29 July 1852, in Bray, County Wicklow, and they had one son, the Rev. Maurice William Day(1858 - 1916).

Church of Ireland titles
Preceded by Robert Daly	Bishop of Cashel, Emly, Waterford and Lismore; 1872–1899	Succeeded by Henry Stewart O'Hara
