= Hugh Bolton (priest) =

Irish Anglican priest

Hugh Bolton was an 18th-century Anglican priest in Ireland. Born c. 1688, son of Capt William of Faithlegg, Mayor of Waterford.

Harman was educated at Trinity College, Dublin, BA 1704. He was Curate of Grangemockler 1712; Vicar of Athassel 1720-34, Rector of Knockgraffon; Dean of Waterford from 1723-58 until his death on 24 December 1758, buried Christ Church Cathedral Waterford.
