= Keenagh =

Village in County Longford, Ireland

Keenagh Irish: Caonach
- Village
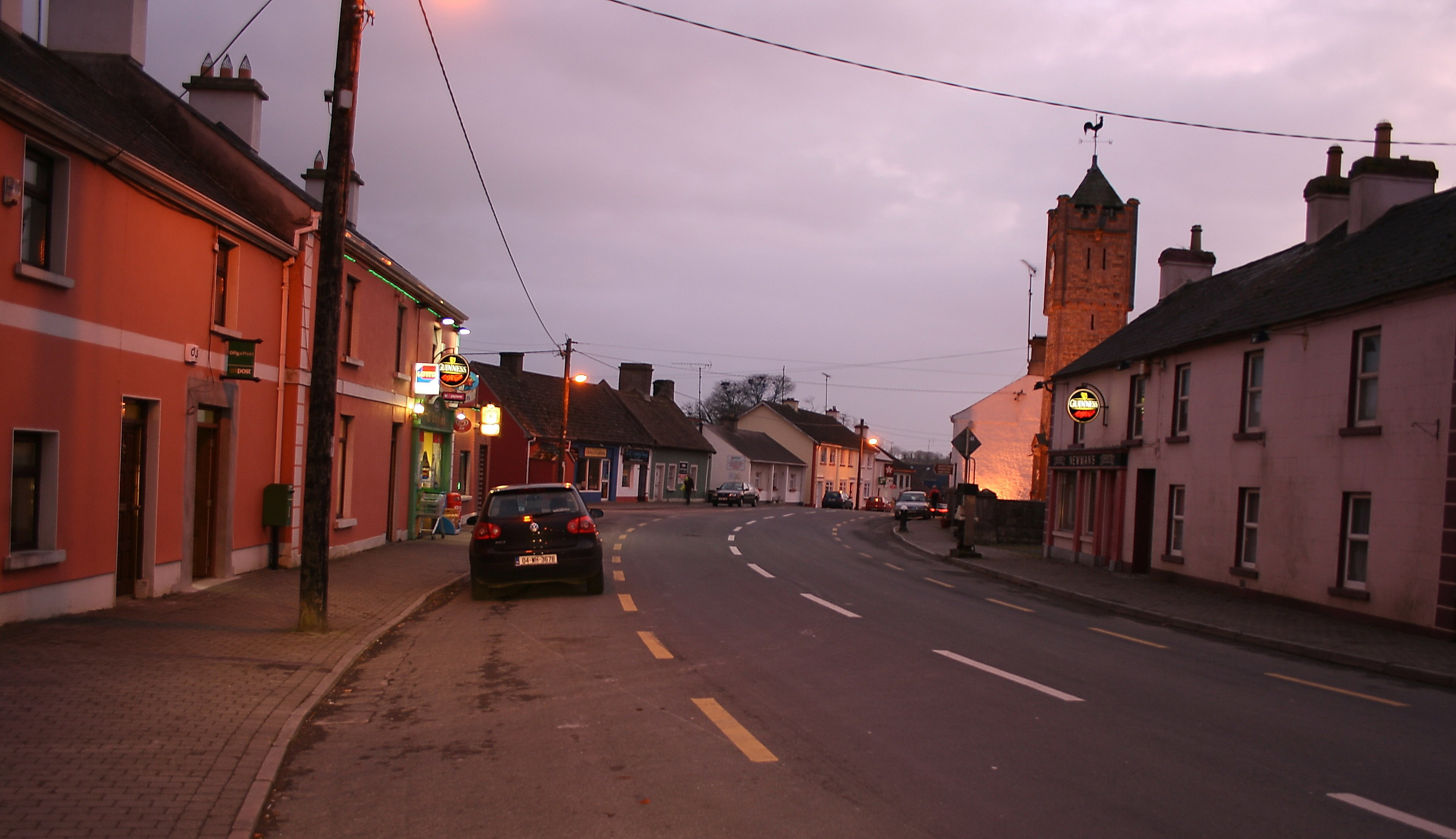
- Main Street (R397) with clock tower, 2007

- Location in Ireland
- Coordinates: 53°37′24″N 7°48′58″W
- Country: Ireland
- Province: Leinster
- County: County Longford

Population (2016)
  - Total: 581
- Time zone: UTC+0 (WET)
  - Summer (DST): UTC-1 (IST (WEST))
- Irish Grid Reference: N125638

Keenagh or Kenagh (Irish: Caonach, meaning 'moss place') is a village in County Longford, Ireland. 14 km (9 mi) south of Longford town, it is on the R397 near the Royal Canal.

The village has two churches (Catholic and Church of Ireland), a couple of shops and three pubs. There are also GAA and soccer clubs in the village, as well as a community centre.

Corlea Trackway is an Iron Age trackway near the village.

The Newcomen Baronets were the local landowners for several generations.

In the period 2000 to 2007 many new houses were built around Keenagh, due to the tax incentives available in the area and without direct consideration to demand. As of 2010, many were vacant or incomplete constituting ghost estates. Between the 2002 and 2016 census, the population of Keenagh more than doubled from 225 to 581 inhabitants.

== See also ==
- List of towns and villages in Ireland
- Keenagh, Templeport, a townland in the parish of Templeport, County Cavan
