= R398 road (Ireland) =

Road in Ireland

Coordinates: 53.655992°N 7.859781°W

R398 road
- Bóthar R398

Route information
- Length: 7.1 km (4.4 mi)

Major junctions
- From: R392 Derraghan More
- Crosses Royal Canal (Ballinamore Bridge) and Fallan River
- To: R397 Brickeens

Location
- Country: Ireland

Highway system
- Roads in Ireland; Motorways; Primary; Secondary; Regional

The R398 road is a regional road in Ireland, located in County Longford.
