= List of brigades of the Irish Republican Army =

This is a list of brigades of the Irish Republican Army, formed or active between 1916 and 1922, which were involved in activities undertaken by the Irish Republican Army.

== Munster ==
=== County Clare ===
Period	Brigade	Division	Commandant
1916–1917	East Clare Brigade		Michael Brennan
1916–1917	Mid Clare Brigade		Sean McNamara
1916–1917	North Clare Brigade		H. J. Hunt
1916–1917	West Clare Brigade		E. Fennell
1917–1918	Clare Brigade		Patrick Brennan
1918–1922	East Clare Brigade	1st Western Division	Michael Brennan
1918–1922	Mid Clare Brigade	1st Western	Frank Barrett
1918–1922	West Clare Brigade	1st Western	Art O'Donnell

=== County Cork ===
Period	Brigade	Division	Commandant
1914-1919	Cork Volunteers	1st Southern Division	Tomás Mac Curtain
1919-1920	1st Cork Brigade	1st Southern Division	Tomás Mac Curtain
1920	1st Cork Brigade	1st Southern Division	Terence MacSwiney
1920-1922	1st Cork Brigade	1st Southern Division	Sean O'Hegarty
1922 (acting)	1st Cork Brigade	1st Southern Division	Mick Leahy
1922	1st Cork Brigade	1st Southern Division	Daniel 'Sandow' O'Donovan
1922-?	1st Cork Brigade	1st Southern Division	Herbert ‘Sean’ Mitchell
1919-1921	2nd Cork Brigade (North Cork Brigade)	1st Southern Division	Liam Lynch
1921	2nd Cork Brigade (North Cork Brigade)	1st Southern Division	Sean Moylan
1921	2nd Cork Brigade (North Cork Brigade)	1st Southern Division	George Power
1919-1920	3rd Cork Brigade (West Cork Brigade)	1st Southern Division	Tom Hales
1920-1921	3rd Cork Brigade (West Cork Brigade)	1st Southern Division	Charlie Hurley
1921-22	3rd Cork Brigade (West Cork Brigade)	1st Southern Division	Tom Barry
1921	4th Cork Brigade	1st Southern Division	Paddy O'Brien
1921-1922	4th Cork Brigade	1st Southern Division	Sean Moylan
1921-1922	5th Cork Brigade	1st Southern Division	Gibbs Ross

=== County Kerry ===
Period	Brigade	Division	Commandant
1914-1917	Kerry Brigade	1st Southern Division	Austin Stack
1917-1919	1st Kerry Brigade	1st Southern Division	Austin Stack
1919–1921	1st Kerry Brigade	1st Southern Division	Patrick Cahill
1921	1st Kerry Brigade	1st Southern Division	Andrew Cooney
1921-1922	1st Kerry Brigade	1st Southern Division	Humphrey Murphy
-1921	2nd Kerry Brigade	1st Southern Division	Dan Mahony
1921	2nd Kerry Brigade	1st Southern Division	Humphrey Murphy
1922	2nd Kerry Brigade	1st Southern Division	John Joe Rice

=== County Tipperary ===
Period	Brigade	Division	Commandant
1918-1922	3rd Tipperary Brigade	2nd southern division	Séumas Robinson

== Leinster ==
=== County Longford ===
Period	Brigade	Division	Commandant
1919-1922	Longford Brigade	1st Midlands Division	Thomas Reddington

=== County Offaly ===
Period	Brigade	Division	Commandant
1920-1922	Offaly Brigade	1st Eastern Division	Barry Byrne

== Ulster ==
=== County Antrim ===
Period	Brigade	Division	Commandant
1916–1922	Belfast Brigade	3rd Northern	Sean Cusack & Joe McKelvey

=== County Cavan ===
Period	Brigade	Division	Commandant
1916–1921	Cavan Brigade	Ulster	Pat Woods
1921–1922	East Cavan Brigade	5th Northern	Peadar McMahon, Seán Gallagher & Séamus McGovern
1921–1922	West Cavan Brigade	6th Northern	Éamonn McGovern, Michael MacManus & Seán Dolan

=== County Donegal ===
Period	Brigade	Division	Commandant
–1922	West Donegal Brigade	1st Northern Division	
–1922	North East Donegal Brigade	1st Northern	
–1922	South West Donegal Brigade	1st Northern	
–1922	South East Donegal Brigade	1st Northern	

=== County Fermanagh ===
No.1 Batt. Enniskillen A. Boho B. Derrygonnelly C. Enniskillen D. Monea E. Rosinuremore

No.2 Batt. Belcoo A. Belcoo B. Doobally C. Glan Lower D. Glan Upper E. Killinagh F. Mullaghdun

=== County Monaghan ===
Period	Brigade	Division	Commandant
1916–1922	Monaghan Brigade	5th Northern Division	Eoin O'Duffy

== Connacht ==
=== County Galway ===
Period	Brigade	Division	Commandant
1916–1920	Galway Brigade		
1920–1922	South East Galway Brigade	1st Western	Joeseph Stanford
1920–1922	North Galway Brigade	2nd Western Division	
1920–1922	West Galway Brigade	4th Western Division	Peter Joe McDonnell

=== County Mayo ===
Period	Brigade	Division	Commandant
	1 West Mayo Brigade	4th Western Division	Ned Mohan
	2 North Mayo Brigade	4th Western Division	C. Mackin; Séamus Kilcullen
1922-	5 North West Mayo	4th Western Division	Anthony Farrell
	East Mayo	3rd Western Division	

== Other ==
Period	Brigade	Division	Commandant
	1st Scottish Brigade	1st Scottish	
	2nd Scottish Brigade	1st Scottish	
	Liverpool Battalion		
	London Battalion		
	Newcastle-on-Tyne Battalion		
	Q Company GHQ		

== Bibliography ==
- Hopkinson, Michael (2002). The Irish War of Independence: The Definitive Account of the Anglo Irish War of 1919-1921. Gill & Macmillan Ltd. ISBN 0-7171-6197-8.
- McKenna, Joseph (2011). Guerrilla Warfare in the Irish War of Independence, 1919-1921. McFarland. ISBN 978-0-7864-8519-2.
