= R397 road (Ireland) =

Road in Ireland

R397 road
- Bóthar R397
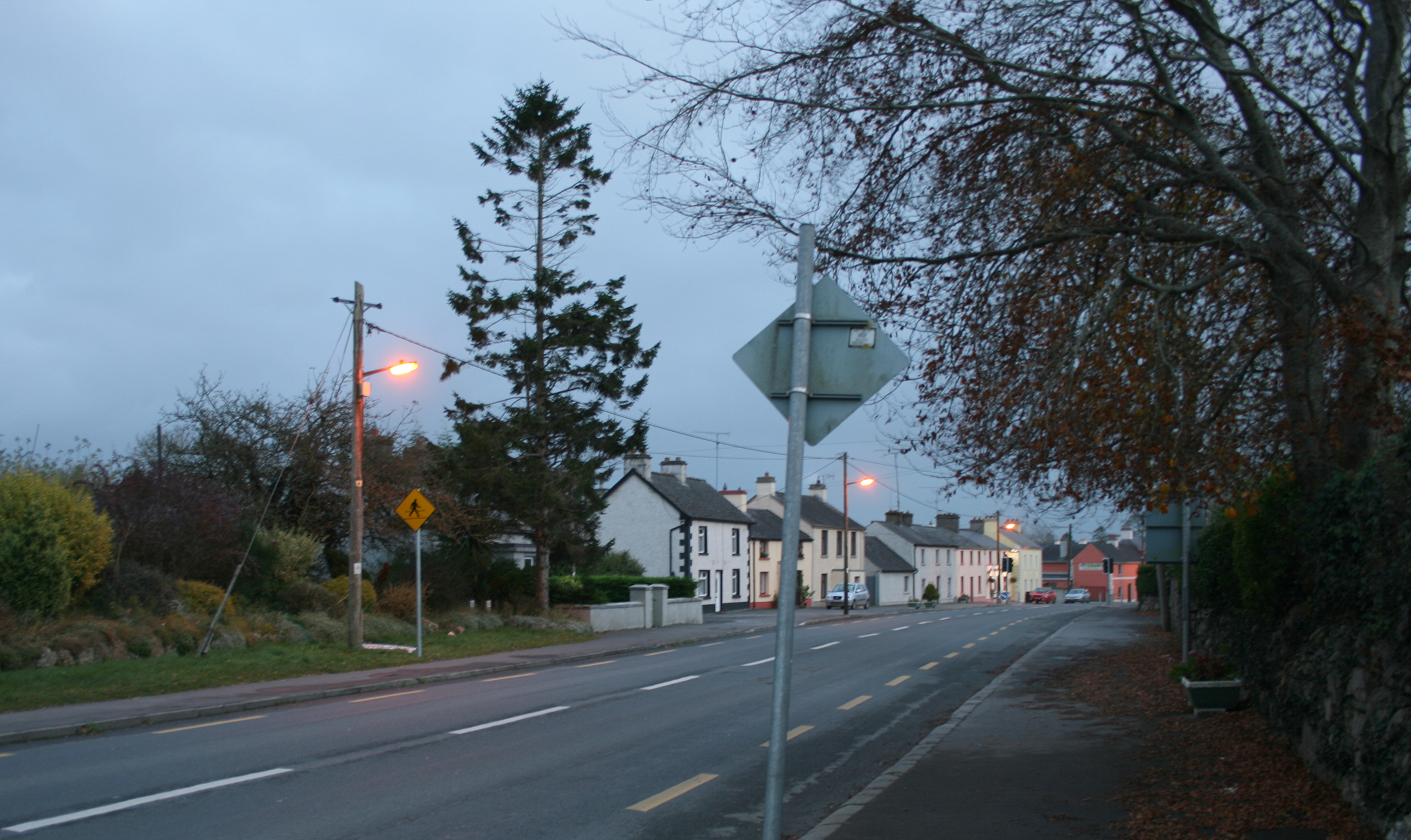
- R397 entering Keenagh

Route information
- Length: 16 km (9.9 mi)

Location
- Country: Ireland
- Primary destinations: County Longford; Leaves the N63 south of Longford; (R398); Keenagh; Terminates at the R3982 near Ballymahon

Highway system
- Roads in Ireland; Motorways; Primary; Secondary; Regional

The R397 road is a regional road in Ireland linking Longford Town to Ballymahon all in County Longford. It passes through the village of Keenagh en route. The road is 16 km (9.9 mi) long.

== See also ==
- Roads in Ireland
- National primary road
- National secondary road
