= Bishop of Cashel and Waterford =

The Bishop of Cashel and Waterford (Full title: Bishop of Cashel and Emly with Waterford and Lismore) was the Ordinary of the Church of Ireland diocese of Cashel and Waterford; comprising all of County Waterford, the southern part of County Tipperary and a small part of County Limerick, Ireland.

== History ==
In the Church of Ireland, although not in the Roman Catholic Church, the bishopric of Waterford and Lismore was united to the archbishopric of Cashel and Emly from 14 August 1833. On the death of Archbishop Laurence of Cashel in 1838, the Province of Cashel was united to the Province of Dublin. The see ceased to be an archbishopric becoming instead the bishopric of Cashel and Waterford.

In 1977, the diocese was split; the former dioceses of Cashel, Waterford and Lismore merged with the "United Dioceses of Ossory, Ferns and Leighlin" to become the United Dioceses of Cashel and Ossory. The remaining part - the former diocese of Emly - was merged with Diocese of Limerick and Killaloe.

== List of bishops ==
List of Bishops of Cashel and Waterford
From	Until	Ordinary	Notes
1839	1842	Stephen Creagh Sandes	Translated from Killaloe and Clonfert; nominated 23 January 1839; letters patent February 1839; died 13 November 1842
1843	1872	Robert Daly	Nominated 28 December 1842; consecrated 29 January 1843; died 16 February 1872
1872	1899	Maurice FitzGerald Day	Elected 19 March 1872; consecrated 14 April 1872; resigned 30 September 1899; died 13 December 1904
1900	1919	Henry Stewart O'Hara	Elected 6 February 1900; consecrated 24 February 1900; resigned 31 March 1919; died 11 December 1923
1919	1931	Robert Miller	Elected 12 May 1919; consecrated 11 June 1919; died 13 March 1931
1931	1934	John Frederick McNeice	Elected 29 April 1931; consecrated 24 June 1931; translated to Down, Connor and Dromore 12 December 1934
1935	1958	Thomas Arnold Harvey	Elected 25 January 1935; consecrated 25 March 1935; resigned 15 May 1958; died 25 December 1966
1958	1968	William Cecil De Pauley	Elected 18 June 1958; consecrated 29 September 1958; died 30 March 1968
1968	1977	John Ward Armstrong	Elected 22 May 1968; consecrated 21 September 1968; became Bishop of Cashel and Ossory in 1977
Since 1977, the see has been part of the united diocese of Cashel and Ossory .
