= Kiltallagh =

Civil parish in County Kerry, Ireland

Kiltallagh Irish: Cill Tulach
- Civil parish
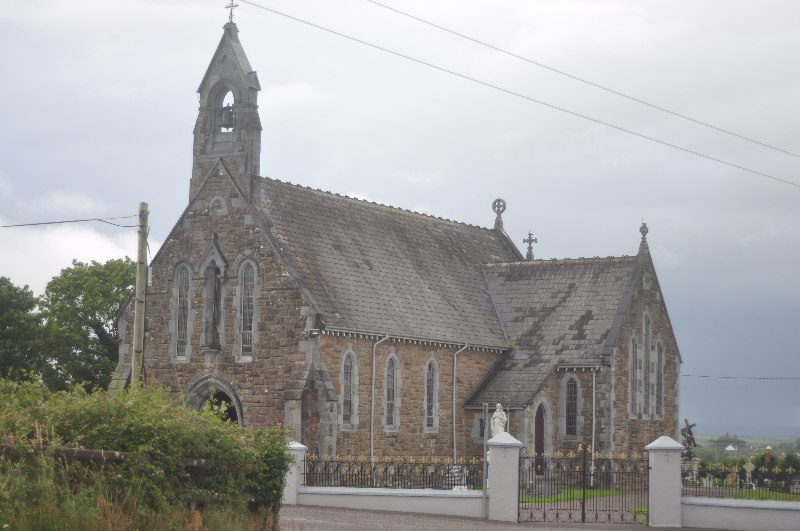
- Kiltallagh Catholic church, in Killeagh townland, is dedicated to Saint Carthage

- Location within Ireland
- Coordinates: 52.187°N 9.668°W
- Country: Ireland
- Province: Munster
- County: Kerry
- Barony: Trughanacmy
- Time zone: UTC+1 (IST)
- Irish grid reference: Q847056

Kiltallagh (Irish: Cill Tulach, meaning 'church of the hillock'), sometimes known as Kiltalla, is a civil parish in the historical barony of Trughanacmy in County Kerry, Ireland. Castlemaine is the largest settlement in the civil parish.

The local Roman Catholic church, dedicated to Saint Carthage, is in Castlemaine Parish in the Roman Catholic Diocese of Kerry. The Church of Ireland church, in Meanus townland in Kiltallagh, is also dedicated to Saint Carthage (or Cartach) and is in the Diocese of Tuam, Limerick and Killaloe. St. Carthage's, built in 1816 on the site of an earlier church, is listed on the Record of Protected Structures by Kerry County Council. As of the 1830s, the parish had a population of approximately 1720 people, of whom 387 lived in the town of Castlemaine.

The townlands and settlements located in Kiltallagh include: Annagh, Ardatedaun, Ballycrispin, Ballygamboon Lower, Ballygamboon Upper, Ballynamona Lower, Ballynamona Upper, Ballyraymeen Lower, Ballyraymeen Upper, Castlemaine, Cloghleagh, Cloonalassan, Cunnavoola, Cuss, Gransha Lower, Gransha Upper, Killeagh, Killeenafinnane, Laharan, Lisnanoul, Meanus and Tonreagh.
