= Brickeens, County Longford =

Townland in County Longford in Ireland

Coordinates: 53.659°N 7.831°W

Brickeens (Irish: Na Broicíní) is a very small townland in County Longford, Ireland. It is about five kilometres north of Keenagh and eight kilometres south of Longford town. Brickeens townland has an area of approximately 146 acres (0.2 sq mi), and had a population of 21 people as of the 2011 census. Evidence of ancient settlement in the townland include two ringforts.
