= Christopher Butson =

Irish bishop (1747–1836)

Christopher Butson was a Church of Ireland bishop in the first half of the 19th century.

Born in England in 1747, he was educated at Winchester and New College, Oxford. He was nominated Dean of Waterford on 2 April and installed there on 12 May 1784. He also became Chancellor of Ferns and Leighlin on 12 March 1802.

He was nominated Bishop of Clonfert and Kilmacduagh on 5 May and consecrated on 29 July 1804. Under the Church Temporalities (Ireland) Act 1833 (3 & 4 Will. 4. c. 37), the sees of Clonfert and Kilmacduagh were united to those of Killaloe and Kilfenora on 29 January 1834, with Butson becoming Bishop of Killaloe and Clonfert of the new united diocese. He died in office on 22 March 1836.

Church of Ireland titles
Preceded by Nathaniel Alexander	Bishop of Clonfert and Kilmacduagh; 1804–1834	Title name change
New title	Bishop of Killaloe and Clonfert; 1834–1836	Succeeded by Stephen Creagh Sandes
