= Kilmacduagh =

Village in County Galway, Ireland

Coordinates: 53°02′049″N 8°053′06″W

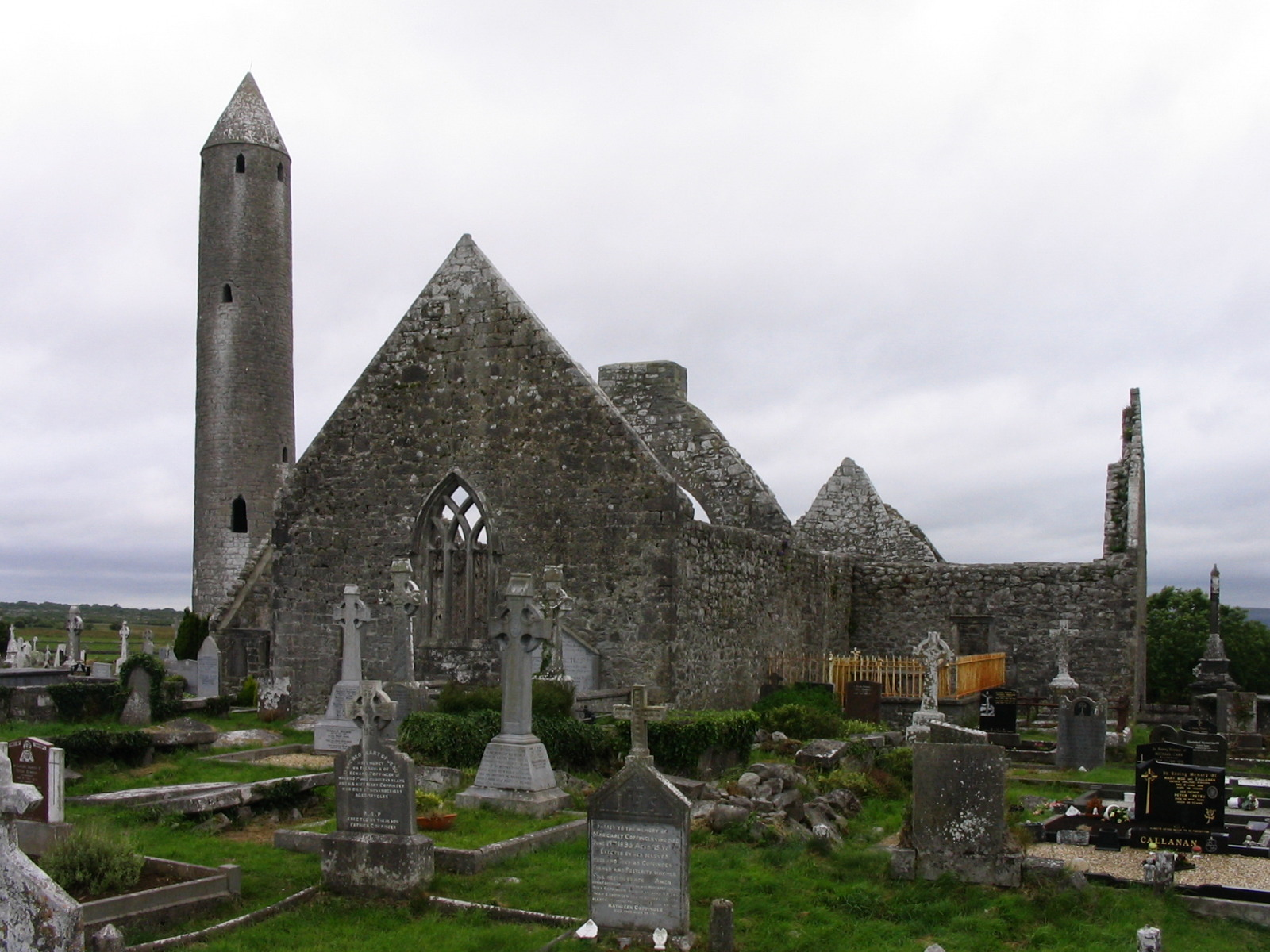
Kilmacduagh Cathedral

Kilmacduagh (Irish: Cill Mhic Dhuach, meaning 'church of Duach's son') is a small village in south County Galway, Ireland, near Gort. The village is in a townland and civil parish of the same name, in Kiltartan barony.

It is the site of Kilmacduagh monastery, seat of a diocese of the same name. The Diocese of Kilmacduagh is now part of the Diocese of Galway and Kilmacduagh in the Roman Catholic Church and in the Diocese of Tuam, Limerick and Killaloe in the Church of Ireland. The former cathedral is now a ruin. The round tower sits beside the cathedral and is from the 11th or 12 century. At 112 feet, it is the tallest tower in Ireland. The towers bell is said to lie at the bottom of a nearby lake.

The village is 5 km (3 mi) to the south-west of Gort via the R460 road.

== Annalistic references ==
- M1199.10. John de Courcy, with the English of Ulidia, and the son of Hugo De Lacy, with the English of Meath, marched to 'Kilmacduagh to assist Cathal Crovderg O'Conor. Cathal Carragh, accompanied by the Connacians, came, and gave them battle: and the English of Ulidia and Meath were defeated with such slaughter that, of their five battalions, only two survived; and these were pursued from the field of battle to Rindown on Lough Ree, in which place John was completely hemmed in. Many of his English were killed, and others were drowned; for they found no passage by which to escape, except by crossing the lake in boats.

== See also ==
- List of towns and villages in Ireland
