= Christopher Butson (priest) =

Irish Dean

The Ven. Christopher Henry Gould Butson (19 April 1817 – 13 June 1892) was an Irish Anglican priest.

Butson was born in Dublin, the son of an Archdeacon of Clonfert, The Ven. James Strange Butson; and was educated at Trinity College, Dublin. He was the Rector of Clontarf; himself Archdeacon of Clonfert from 1855 to 1874; and then the Dean of Kilmacduagh from 1874 until his death on 13 June 1892.
