= The Prophesying Nun of Dresden =

1976 essay by Renzo Baschera

Le profezie della monaca di Dresda [The Prophecies of the Nun of Dresden]
- Author: Renzo Baschera
- Original title: Le profezie della monaca di Dresda
- Language: Italian
- Genre: Christian novel
- Publisher: MEB
- Publication date: 1976, 1978, 1986
- Publication place: Italy
- Media type: Novel
- Pages: 200 (third edition)

The Prophecies of the Nun of Dresden (Italian: Le profezie della monaca di Dresda) is a novel by Renzo Baschera which takes the form of an essay analyzing several manuscripts purportedly found at the beginning of the 19th century. These manuscripts contain prophecies about the last Popes, the great European dynasties, technological progress, several disasters and the end of time, from the end of the 17th century to the end of the 30th century.

== Structure of the book ==
=== Introduction ===
The Prophecies of the Nun of Dresden begins with an introduction, which shows the few historical notes of the prophetic manuscripts. These writings, according to Baschera's novel, were mentioned for the first time by a certain Abbot Nicolas Holb in 1808 in Vienna. The author of the manuscripts, written in the form of letters, was a German nun and clairvoyant whose actual name is not known. Of her, it is only known that she was “a pious Religious born in Dresden in 1680 and died in 1706” and that “ . . . her convent was on the banks of the Elbe” River. Some of the letters were written in German, some more in Latin and the others in both languages. This is surprising, especially considering the humble origins of the nun, who is thought to be illiterate.

In the third edition of the novel, the author adds a premise which claims to interpret the contemporary events (1986) in the light of the writings of the Nun, expecting the fulfillment of the predictions by the end of the 20th century.

=== Analysis of the letters ===
In the main section of the novel, the author analyzes the documents in his possession, a series of thirty-one letters written to the people who lived at the end of the 17th century and the beginning of the 18th century. Some of them are in good condition, some are very damaged and others are copied. The analysis is divided into three groups:

Letters to the Kings and Popes:

- Pope Clement XI
- Victor Amadeus II of Savoy
- Charles XII of Sweden
- Peter the Great of Russia
- Frederick I of Prussia
- Philip V of Spain
- Anne of England
- Louis XIV of France

Letters to the Cardinals:

- Rinaldo d’Este
- Francesco Maria de' Medici

Letters to other Religious of the Catholic Church:

- A certain abbot Argoth
- The sister (or consorella) Marta
- A certain abbot Koldan
- A theologian Bruks

In letters to the historical figures several major events are predicted to happen to them and later their descendants or their country. In letters to the others, religious events are predicted general concern that some historical developments, some disasters and some technical progress. Letters of the Nun of Dresden prophesy events through a period of time from the end of the 17th century to the end of the 30th century.

=== Conclusion ===
The paper ends with a brief analysis of a particular aspect: the characters speak in a voice that suggests to the nun almost all of what to write. At first, the authority of the nun is posted with this entry, as is the case for most of the clairvoyants; subsequently, unlike the others that kept the detachment from all their visions, the woman accepted more and more the presence of what became the “sweet voice” letters, even when it promised catastrophe.

== Prophecies ==
=== Prophecies for the Popes of the Catholic Church ===
According to the author, like the Prophecies of St. Malachy, the Nun of Dresden even gives a motto for the Popes, but only for the last eleven of them:

Motto of the Nun	Who is supposed to be	Motto of St. Malachy
White horse, with the sign of the Lion	Leo XIII (Gioacchino Pecci, 1878–1903)	Lumen de coelo
Black horse, with the sign of Mercy	Pius X (Giuseppe Sarto, 1903–14)	Ignis Ardens
Yellow horse, with the sign of the Blessing	Benedict XV (Giacomo Della Chiesa, 1914–22)	Religio depopulata
Red horse, with the sign of Mercy	Pius XI (Achille Ratti, 1922–39)	Fidens intrepida
Yellow horse, with the sign of Mercy	Pius XII (Eugenio Pacelli, 1939–58)	Pastor angelicus
Red horse, with the sign of the Precursor	John XXIII (Angelo Roncalli, 1958–63)	Pastor et nauta
Black horse, with the sign of Benjamin	Paul VI (Giovanbattista Montini, 1963–78)	Flos florum
White horse, with the sign of Mercy	John Paul I (Albino Luciani, 1978)	De medietate Lunae
Angelic Master of Jehoshaphat, with the sign of the Twelve	John Paul II (Karol Wojtyla, 1978–2005)	De Labore solis
Angelic Guide of Jehoshaphat, with the sign of Glory	Benedict XVI (Joseph Ratzinger, 2005–13)	De gloria olivae
Angel of Mercy, with the sign of Martyrdom	Francis (Jorge Bergoglio, 2013–25)	Petrus Romanus

The author points out that the name chosen by each of the several popes is connected to the sign prophesied by the motto. The author also notes a link between the color of the horses, according to the Four Horsemen of the Apocalypse, and the historical period in which the pope lived:

- white horses correspond to the victory of the spiritual power of the Church;
- black horses correspond to a period of justice and balance;
- yellow horses correspond to death
- red horses correspond to the rider who takes away peace and represents a period of preparation for war.

In a letter to Frederick I of Prussia, the nun predicts that “the last Peter will come from your land”. Prussia is the name of a historical region that now lies between the borders of Lithuania, Russia and Poland with parts of eastern Germany.

=== Prophecies for the House of Savoy ===
In her letter to Victor Amadeus II of Savoy, the visionary German made several prophecies about the House of Savoy. The letter is divided into three parts. In the first part, the nun warns the Duke about his conduct and is more a moral poem than a prophecy. The second part contains the prophecies about the Duke himself: already at the beginning, the nun turns to Victor Amadeus II, calling him the "future king", as he would very soon become the “king of an island” (that did really happen in 1713, in Sicily), then the king of another island (that happened in 1720, in Sardinia), and the “king of the mountains” (which, however, did not happen).

In the third part of the letter, the prophecies of the House of Savoy are contained. Savoy's reign is likened to a parade of horse-drawn carriages. There are actually two. In the first of them, each carriage was pulled by eight smaller horses (i.e., the Kingdom of Sardinia) and, in the second, each carriage had five larger horses (i.e., the Kingdom of Italy). So far, the total of the rulers of the House of Savoy is eleven. Eight of them were the Kings of Sardinia, from Victor Amadeus II to Victor Emmanuel II, and the other four were the Kings of Italy, from Victor Emmanuel II to Umberto II. According to the author, the total would be eleven, if one counts twice Victor Emmanuel II, who was both the King of Sardinia and the King of Italy. The nun predicts that, between the fourth and fifth “big horse-drawn carriage” (i.e., between the fourth and fifth Kings of Italy), there would be a pause, during which the carriage was driven by “black horses”, which the author interprets as a republican or oligarchic government. According to the interpretation of this prophecy by Baschera, Italy would now be in this moment of pause so, in the future, there could be a fifth King of Italy, the twelfth and last king of the House of Savoy. He would be represented by a horse with a white cross and reign for a short time.

The nun gives an indication of the duration of both the Kingdom of Sardinia and the Kingdom of Italy, before the Republican break: the first would have a duration of “twelve times twelve years” (144, three years more than the actual total of 141 years), while the second would have a duration of "the year upside down" for the first king of Italy (who died at the age of almost 58 years, after the reign of little more than 85 years). The nun also includes, for the five Kings of Italy from the House of Savoy, how they would die:

The Nun's prophecy	Whom was meant	Actual cause of death
die of the plague	Victor Emmanuel II	fever caused by a lung infection
die in the fire	Umberto I	killed by a gunshot
die from grief	Victor Emmanuel III	in exile, a natural death
die from grief	Umberto II	in exile, a natural death
die from grief	?	?

She, as interpreted by the author, also prophesied that the fifth and last king of the House of Savoy of Italy would die in exile, a natural death.

== See also ==
- Prophecy of the Popes
- Vaticinia de Summis Pontificibus
- Vaticinia Nostradami

== Editions ==
- (it) Renzo Baschera, Le profezie della monaca di Dresda [The Prophecies of the Nun of Dresden]. Turin: MEB, 1976.
- (it) Renzo Baschera, Le profezie della monaca di Dresda, 2nd ed. Turin: MEB, 1978.
- (It) Renzo Baschera, Le profezie della monaca di Dresda, 3rd ed. Padua: MEB, 1986. ISBN 88-7669-138-3

== Other works ==
The same author, on the same subject, has also written the following book:

- (it) Renzo Baschera; Ettore Cheynet, M. Longato (ed.), Il grande libro delle profezie. La storia del mondo dal 1990 al 2090 secondo Nostradamus, la monaca di Dresda, don Bosco e Rasputin [The Big Book of Prophecies. The History of the World from 1990 to 2090 according to Nostradamus, the Nun of Dresden, Don Bosco, and Grigori Rasputin], MEB, 1994. ISBN 88-766-9438-2
