= Olivetans =

Catholic monastic order

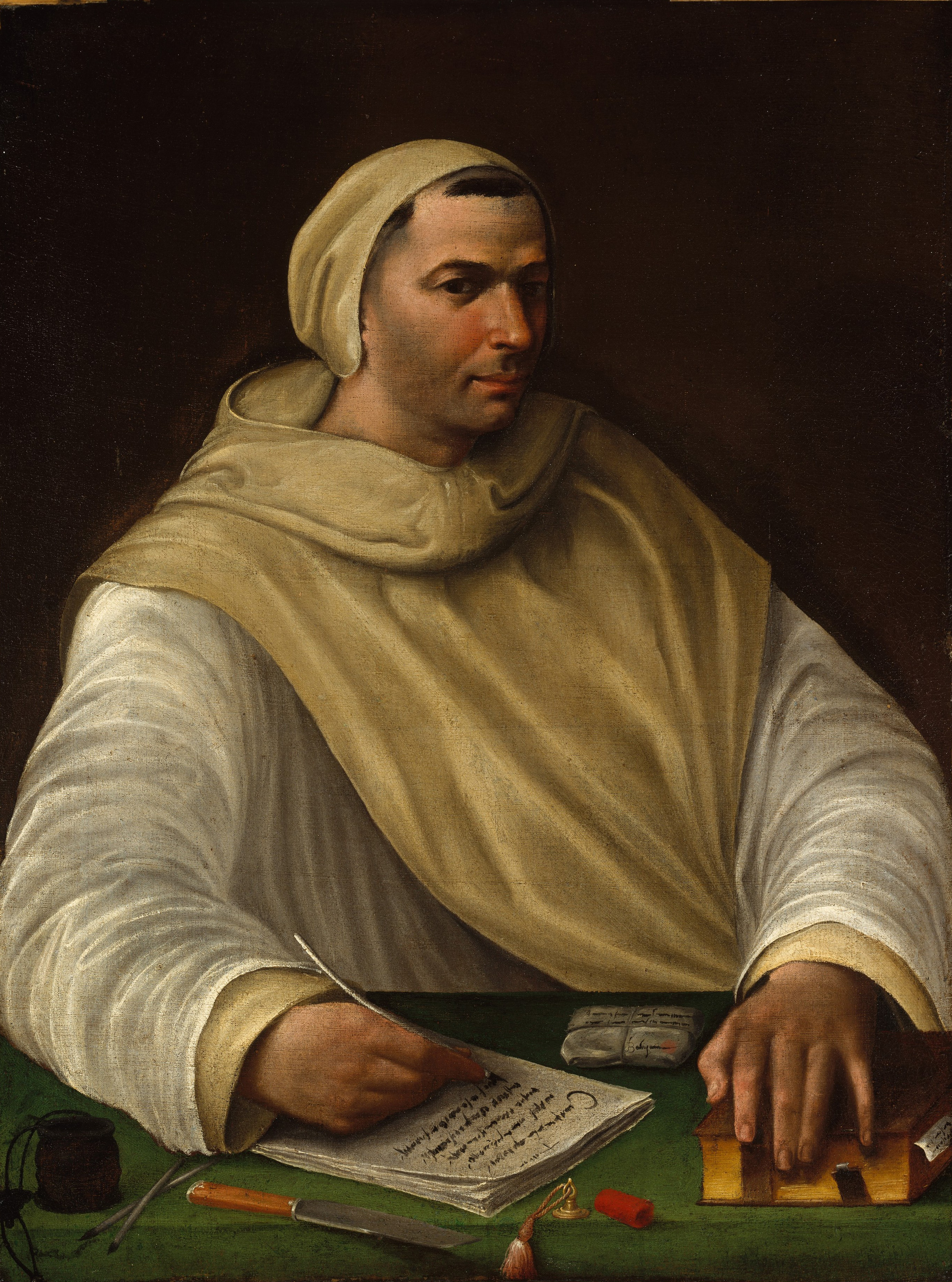
Depiction of an Olivetan monk, 16th century

The Olivetans, formally known as the Order of Our Lady of Mount Olivet, are a monastic order. They were founded in 1313 and recognised in 1344. They use the Rule of Saint Benedict and are a member of the Benedictine Confederation, where they are also known as the Olivetan Congregation, but are distinguished from the Benedictines in their white habit and centralized organisation. They use the post-nominals 'OSB Oliv'.

== History ==
=== Foundation ===
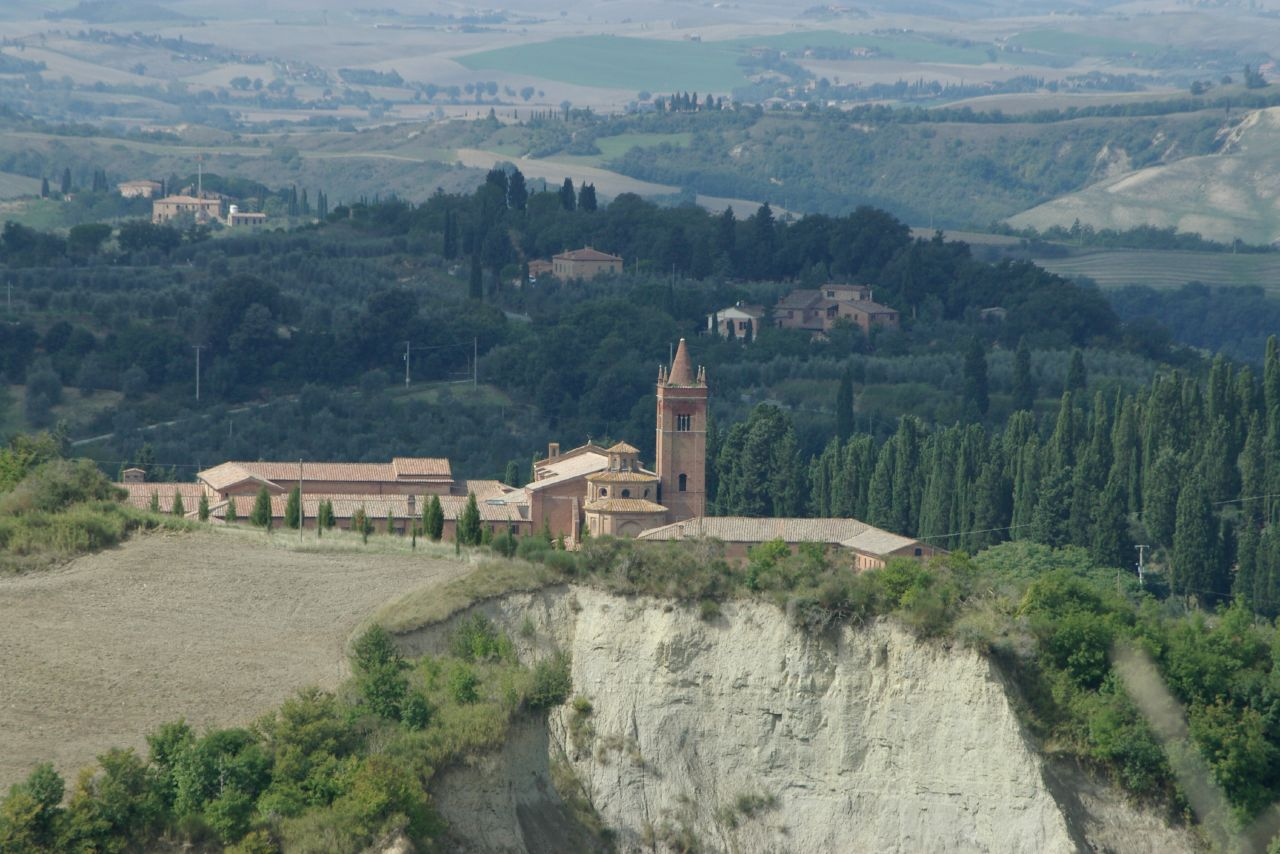
Monte Oliveto Maggiore

The Olivetans were founded in 1313 by Bernardo Tolomei (born Giovanni Tolomei) along with two of his friends from the noble families of Siena, Patrizio Patrizi and Ambrogio Piccolomini. They initially lived as hermits in the "savage waste of Accona". The building of the monastery here began with the approbation of the foundation charter by Guido Tarlati, bishop of Arezzo (26 March 1319).

The name "Olivetan" comes from the name of the order's original hermitage, called Monte Oliveto in honour of Christ's Passion. The monastery later became known as "Monte Oliveto Maggiore" ("greater") to distinguish it from successive foundations at Florence, San Gimignano, Naples and elsewhere. It is still the motherhouse of the order or congregation.

After the arrival of a number of new followers, the nascent community adopted the Rule of St. Benedict and was recognised by Pope Clement VI in 1344. In 1408 Gregory XII gave them the extinct monastery of St. Justina at Padua, which they occupied until the institution there of the Benedictine reform.

== Today ==
Unlike many other Benedictine congregations, the Olivetans have a centralized structure, supervised by the abbot general at Monte Oliveto Maggiore. Olivetan Benedictines wear a white habit.

The Olivetan monks run Bec Abbey in France, which was left in ruins in 1792 by the French Revolution. In 1948 Olivetans from the Monastery of Our Lady of Holy Hope at Mesnil-Saint-Loup and the Monastery of the Virgin Mary at Cormeilles-en-Parisis re-established the monastery at Bec.

In 1955, Benedictine monks from St. Benedict's Abbey in Wisconsin took over the former Trappist monastery of Our Lady of Guadalupe Abbey in Pecos, New Mexico. In 1985, the monastery became part of the Olivetan congregation. The abbey offers retreats and spiritual direction.

The Monastery of Christ Our Saviour was founded in 1980 in the village of Turvey Abbey, Bedfordshire. Adjacent to the monastery is the Priory of Our Lady of Peace of Olivetan Benedictine nuns. The monastery and the priory share worship services. While the monks have no outside apostolate, guests are welcome. The priory is not open to the public, but the chapel is open and visitors are welcome.

The Congregation also maintain abbeys and prioral churches in Italy, the United Kingdom, Ireland, Belgium, Switzerland, Israel, Korea, Mexico, Guatemala and Brazil. In 1960 they formed the Olivetan Congregation within the Benedictine Confederation.

== Olivetan nuns and sisters ==
Olivetan nuns are distinguished from the sisters in that the nuns focus primarily on the Divine Office according to the Rule of Saint Benedict, while the sisters engage in outside apostolates such as religious education or pastoral care, and therefore follow a modified form of the rule.

In 1874, Benedictine sisters from the Convent of Maria Rickenbach in the Canton of Unterwalden, Switzerland, arrived as teachers in Maryville, Missouri. Shortly thereafter some of the sisters were sent to Arkansas. In 1893 the Arkansas community affiliated with the Olivetans. In 1900, they opened St. Bernard's Hospital in Jonesboro.

== In popular culture ==
The Prophecy of St. Malachy is a supposed list of 112 popes beginning in 1143 with Pope Celestine II and continuing apparently to the end of time. It was allegedly discovered around 1595 by Benedictine monk Arnold de Wyon, who attributes it to the 12th century Malachy of Armagh. Each pope is identified with a short cryptic motto. The next to last pope has the motto Gloria oliuæ (Glory of the olive).

After the election of Joseph Ratzinger to the papacy in 2005, proponents of the prophecy connected him to the entry for the next to last pope: Ratzinger chose the name Benedict; one of the Benedictine congregations is the Olivetans, thus, Gloria oliuæ.

However, there is no particular connection between the Olivetan Order and Pope Benedict XVI. In 1139, Malachy visited Rome, stopping at Clairvaux Abbey both on the way and on his return. His contemporary, Bernard of Clairvaux wrote a vita of St. Malachy, providing many interesting anecdotes, but does not mention any prophecy. Reputable church historians since the 18th century have considered "The Prophecy of St. Malachy" a forgery, most likely written around 1590. Most scholars consider the document a 16th-century elaborate hoax, bearing similarities to a 1557 history of the popes by Onofrio Panvinio, including mistakes.

Thomas Groome, of Boston College said, "...the 'Prophecies of St. Malachy' are a grand old fun tale that have about as much reliability as the morning horoscope".

== Sources ==
- Giuseppe Picasso. "La spiritualità dell'antico monachesimo alle origini di Monte Oliveto," in Giancarlo Andenna / Mirko Breitenstein / Gert Melville (eds.): Charisma und religiöse Gemeinschaften im Mittelalter. Akten des 3. Internationalen Kongresses des "Italienisch-deutschen Zentrums für Vergleichende Ordensgeschichte". Münster / Hamburg / Berlin / London: LIT 2005 (Vita regularis. Ordnungen und Deutungen religiosen Lebens im Mittelalter, 26), 443–461.
