= Prophecies of Malachi =

Prophecies of Malachi may refer to:

- Prophecy of the Popes, attributed to Saint Malachy
- the Biblical Book of Malachi
