= Bishop of Waterford =

The Bishop of Waterford was a medieval prelate, governing the Diocese of Waterford from its creation in the 11th century until it was absorbed into the new Roman Catholic Diocese of Waterford and Lismore in the 14th century. After the creation of four archdioceses for Ireland in the middle of the 12th century, Waterford fell under the Archbishop of Cashel.

The beginnings of the bishopric of Waterford can be dated fairly securely. The Norse city of Waterford became a bishopric in 1096, when Anselm, Archbishop of Canterbury consecrated Malchus (Máel Ísu Ua hAinmere) as its first bishop. Pope John XXII had decreed on 31 June 1327 that the bishoprics of Waterford and Lismore were to be united upon the death of either living bishop, Nicholas Welifed of Waterford (died 1337) and John Leynagh of Lismore (died 1354). This did not occur until 1363 however, when Thomas le Reve, Leynagh's successor at Lismore, took over the temporalities of the bishopric of Waterford.

== List of bishops ==
Bishops of Waterford
From	Until	Incumbent	Notes
1096	1135	Máel Ísu Ua hAinmere, O.S.B.	Formerly a monk of Winchester Abbey; consecrated bishop on 27 December 1096 by St Anselm; appointed the first Archbishop of Cashel at the Synod of Rathbreasail in 1111, but appears to have resigned it shortly afterwards and retired back to Waterford; during the last years of his life was also Bishop of Lismore; died in 1135; also was known in Latin as Malchus
before 1152	unknown	Toistius	Attended at the Synod of Kells in 1152; death date unknown
1175	1182	Augustinus Ua Selbaig	Elected 6 October 1175; attended at the Third Council of the Lateran in 1179; died 1182
before 1198	1204	Robert I	Found to be bishop around 1195 and 1198; died before October 1204
1204	1209	David the Welshman	Elected before 19 October 1204 and consecrated later in the same year; following a dispute concerning property with the Bishop of Lismore, he was murdered in 1209 by Ua Fáeláin, King of the Déise; also known as David "Breathnach"
1210	1223	Robert II	Elected after June 1210; died before April 1223
1223	1225	William Wace	Formerly Dean of Waterford; elected bishop before 5 April and received possession of the temporalities 6 April 1223; died before 19 April 1225
1227	1232	Walter, O.S.B.	Formerly Prior of St John's Abbey, Waterford; elected bishop circa 20 August 1227 and received possession of the temporalities after that date; 1 August 1232
1232	1250	Stephen, O.S.B.	Elected before 19 December 1232 and received possession of the temporalities after that date; died before March 1250
1250	1251	Henry	Formerly Archdeacon of Waterford; elected bishop before 11 March 1250 and received possession of the temporalities after that date; died 20 July 1251
1252	1254	Philip	Formerly Dean of Waterford; elected bishop before 26 March 1252 and received possession of the temporalities 14 June 1252; died 15 April 1254
1255	1271	Walter de Southwell	Elected before 2 April 1255 and was confirmed by Pope Alexander IV on that date; died circa 24 March 1271
1274	1286	Stephen de Fulbourn	Elected before 10 June 1274 and received possession of the temporalities 28 October 1274; translated to Tuam 12 July 1286. Also Lord High Treasurer of Ireland 1278-1281.
1286	1307	Walter de Fulburn	Brother of the previous bishop; translated from Meath 12 July 1286; died 14 December 1307
1308	1322	Matthew	Formerly Chancellor of Waterford; elected bishop 7 February 1308; died 18 December 1322
1323	1337	Nicholas Welifed	Formerly Dean of Waterford; consecrated bishop 17 April 1323 and received possession of the temporalities 28 July 1323; died 27 June 1337
1338	1349	Richard Francis	Elected before 6 April 1338 and received possession of the temporalities on that date; acted as a suffragan bishop in the diocese of Exeter 1338; died circa 1349
1349	1350	Robert Elyot	Elected circa 1349 and consecrated in June 1349; deprived of Waterford before March 1350, and the following year he was appointed to Killala on 8 June 1351
1350	1361	Roger Cradock, O.F.M.	Appointed 2 March 1350; received possession of the temporalities 17 August 1350 and again 10 May 1352; translated to Llandaff in December 1361; died 22 June 1382
In 1363, Waterford united with the see of Lismore to form the united bishopric of Waterford and Lismore

== See also ==
- Diocese of Waterford
- Waterford Cathedral
