= Thomas le Reve =

Irish bishop

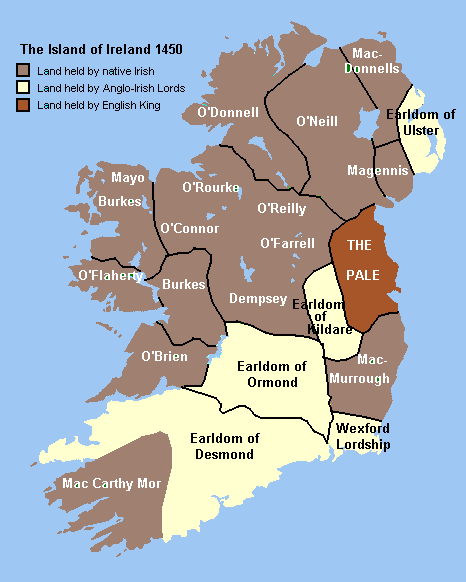
Historical map of Ireland

Thomas le Reve (died 1394) was the first Bishop of Waterford and Lismore following the unification of the two sees in 1363, and was also Lord Chancellor of Ireland. He was a strong-minded and combative individual, who was not afraid to clash with his ecclesiastical superiors.

== Life ==
Little is known of his early life, but a reference to his "great age" at death suggests that he was born in the early years of the fourteenth century. His name is believed to be an early form of Reeves, which later became common in Ireland. He had at least one brother Walter, who was also a priest. He was prebendary of the Diocese of Killaloe and then of the Diocese of Lismore, and a canon of Lismore Cathedral. He was also Archdeacon of Cashel for a time.

=== Bishop ===
He became Bishop of Lismore in 1358. In 1363 Pope Urban V united the sees of Lismore and Waterford with le Reve as the first bishop of the united see. The union had been decreed as early as 1327 by Pope John XXII; it was to take effect on the death of whichever bishop predeceased the other, but for reasons which are unclear the union did not take place on the death of John Leynagh (or Launaught), le Reve's predecessor as Bishop of Lismore, in 1354. It may well be that le Reve used his influence to ensure that he, not Roger Cradock, the Bishop of Waterford, who should have succeeded to the united see on Leynagh's death, would be the first bishop. Although King Edward III ordered that the temporalities of the diocese be delivered to Cradock, this was not done; and four years later, when Cradock was translated to the see of Landaff, le Reve was confirmed as bishop of the united see without a formal election.

He spent part of 1363 at the Papal Court in Avignon, where he sought a number of benefits for himself and the clergy of his dioceses, but few of them were granted.

=== Lord Chancellor ===
He was briefly Lord Chancellor of Ireland in 1367–8. Few records of his tenure in the office survive, but he was accused of improper conduct in using the Great Seal of Ireland to retrospectively appoint his own candidates to certain offices, in particular his clumsy attempts to present his brother Walter to a church living in County Meath, which was overruled by the King personally. This may have been the reason for his removal from office. A brief power struggle developed between Le Reve's friends at Court and those of his rival for the office, Thomas de Burley, Prior of the Order of St. John of Jerusalem, who had the advantage of long experience in the office, having already been Lord Chancellor in 1359–64. Burley emerged as the victor in the struggle.

Le Reve attended the Irish Parliament held at Kilkenny in 1367, which passed the celebrated Statutes of Kilkenny, an attempt to enforce a rigid legal and cultural separation between the Old Irish and the Anglo-Irish. Le Reve gave his full support to the Statutes. He was also present at the Parliament of 1371, where he quarrelled with both the Lord Treasurer of Ireland, Stephen de Valle (or Wall), Bishop of Limerick, and the Lord Lieutenant of Ireland, Sir William de Windsor. Relations with Windsor remained bad throughout the latter's tenure in office; it has been suggested that Windsor took his revenge in the Parliament of 1375, where Le Reve was assigned the notoriously unpopular task of collecting taxes.

He remained a member of the Privy Council of Ireland and, despite his advancing age, he attended its meetings occasionally.

=== Quarrel with Archbishop of Cashel ===
Perhaps our best insight into le Reve's character comes from the glimpse we get of him in the written account of the visitation of Philip de Torrington, Archbishop of Cashel, in 1374. Le Reve emerges from this account as a formidable and quarrelsome individual, as indeed was Torrington. We have only Torrington's side of the story, which may not be entirely objective; but that le Reve could be quarrelsome is clear from his clashes with Windsor and Bishop de Valle.

According to Torrington, le Reve resisted the visitation by armed force, and, although already an old man by medieval standards, he physically assaulted the Archbishop. He then looked on with approval as the Archdeacon of Cashel, who has accompanied Torrington, was attacked and seriously wounded by armed men in le Reve's retinue.

Surprisingly little seems to have come of the episode. Torrington excommunicated le Reve, but this drastic step had no obvious effect on le Reve's career. In 1377, while in England, Torrington attempted to persuade the Government there to take action against the bishop, but again nothing seems to have come of it, and when Torrington died in 1380 le Reve was still in possession of his see.

== Death ==
Despite his age he was still active in his See in 1391, when he obtained the appointment of a new parish priest of Kilmeadan. He died at an advanced age in September 1394.
