= Diocese of Waterford =

Diocese in Ireland (1096–1363)

The Diocese of Waterford was established in the year AD 1096. It was merged with the Diocese of Lismore on 16 June 1363 to form the Diocese of Waterford and Lismore. The merged entity remained an independent diocese in the Roman Catholic Church. In the Church of Ireland, it underwent further mergers and is currently incorporated within the United Dioceses of Cashel, Waterford, Lismore, Ossory, Ferns and Leighlin and is referred to as the Diocese of Cashel and Ossory.

- Roman Catholic Diocese of Waterford and Lismore
- Diocese of Cashel and Ossory
