= Bishop of Ardmore =

Episcopal title

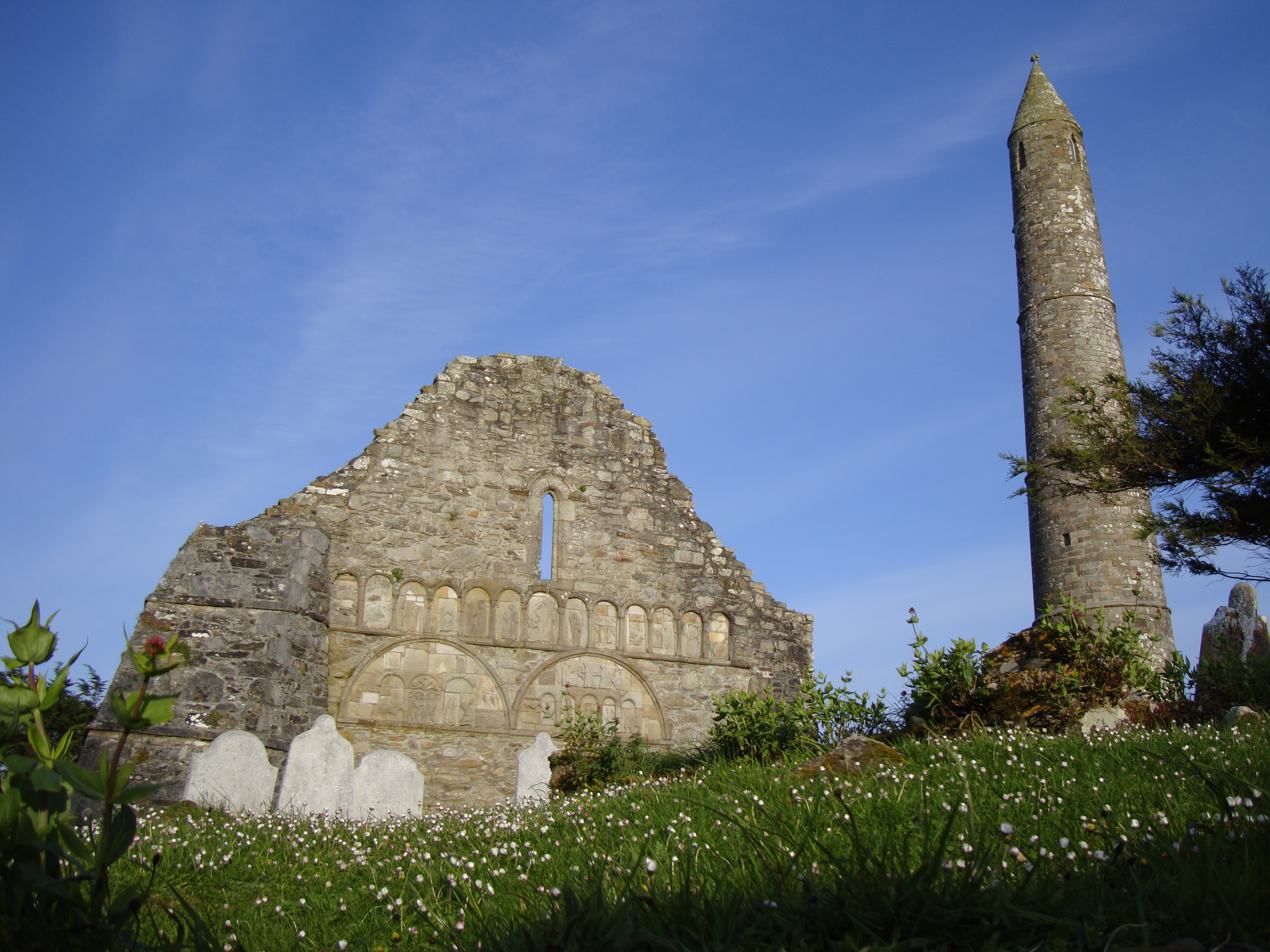
The remains of Ardmore Cathedral and round tower

The Bishop of Ardmore was an episcopal title which took its name after the monastic settlement of Ardmore in County Waterford, Ireland.

Ardmore was not included in the list of Irish dioceses approved at the Synod of Kells, but is named as a church which claimed the right to a bishopric. A bishop of Ardmore took the oath of fealty to Henry II of England in 1172. Bishop Eugenius appears as a witness to a charter some years later, and he also acted as a suffragan bishop in the diocese of Lichfield in 1184 and 1185. Ua Selbaig, who died at Cork in 1205, may have been bishop of Ardmore or of Ross. By the late 12th century, Ardmore was incorporated into Lismore.
