= Oracles of Leo the Wise =

12th century Greek collection of Byzantine oracles

Illustration by Georgios Klontzas from a bilingual Greek–Latin manuscript made in 1577 (now Bodleian, MS Barocci 170)

The Oracles of Leo the Wise (Greek Tou sophōtatou basileōs Leontos chrēsmoi; Latin Oracula Leonis or Vaticinia Leonis) is a Greek collection of oracles attributed to the Byzantine emperor Leo VI the Wise (886–912). In actuality, the collection was first put together in the twelfth century by an anonymous editor probably working in Constantinople.

At the core of the collection are six oracles composed shortly after 815. A further four oracles were added to the collection after the sack of Constantinople in 1204. The numbering of the oracles varies between manuscripts. These ten form the first part and are vaticinia ex eventu, records of past events written as prophecy. The five oracles in the second part are actual prophecies. This set of fifteen or sixteen oracles is mostly written in iambic verse in a high register of Greek. Oracles 10 and 11 are in prose. A second set of seven longer poems in vernacular Greek also circulated in separate manuscripts. Cyril Mango dates some of these poems to the thirteenth century.

== Synopsis ==
The Oracles foretell a series of five emperors. The first looks like a dog. His children will be killed by a serpent. The second is a flying serpent. Two crows will blind him. The third is symbolized by a cross-bearing eagle from the South and a unicorn who will fall suddenly on wet ground. The fourth is an old man carrying a scythe and a rose. He will build pagan temples and reign nine years. The fifth, a bull, will reign happily.

Following the five emperors, a bear with cubs will come to power and the emperor is divided. Constantinople will descend into civil war and sinners will be destroyed. An old man, symbolized by a fox, will seize power. Constantinople will fall. A man with fingers like scythes will blaspheme. The murderous patriarch John will have his beard cut off. God's anointed, Menahem, will be revealed. A prophet, he has been concealed in western Constantinople for a long time. He will liberate the city and restore it to rule.

== Transmission ==
Dozens of manuscripts survive in Europe and the Near East. Many of them are lavishly illustrated with a standard set of sixteen sympolic pictures. The second set of prophecies is not typically illustrated. No manuscript is earlier than the fall of Constantinople (1453). There is no critical edition, although several manuscripts have been published. The earliest reference to the Oracles is much earlier than the manuscripts. It is found in the work of Niketas Choniates around 1200.

The Oracles circulated alongside the Cento of the True Emperor. There is a literary relationship between the two, but the Cento is not a paraphrase of the Oracles as formerly thought. It is not even certain that the author of the Cento quotes the Oracles rather than the latter's source. The Oracles was translated into Latin in the thirteenth century. This is usually dated to 1280–1292, but Katelyn Mesler argues for an earlier period (1250–1275). They circulated in Latin as the Cardinal Prophecies and spawned a family of texts known as the Pope Prophecies. A new Latin translation was made around 1577 by Francesco Barozzi, who interpreted the text for his patron, Giacomo Foscarini, as prophesying Christian victory over the Ottoman Empire. Two bilingual manuscript copies of Barozzi's work illustrated by Georgios Klontzas survive.

Old Slavonic translations of the Oracles are also known in Bulgarian, Serbian and Russian recensions. The Serbian text, known from a fifteenth-century manuscript, is attributed to Stefan Lazarević (1402–1427).

The Paris manuscripts of the vernacular Leo oracles has been edited by Emile Legrand in the nineteenth century and the Vienna manuscripts has been more recently edited by Erich Trapp.

== Works cited ==
- Alexander, Paul J. (2023) [1985]. The Byzantine Apocalyptic Tradition. University of California Press.
- Antonopoulou, Theodora, ed. (1997). The Homilies of the Emperor Leo VI. Brill.
- Brandes, Wolfram (2012). "Oracula Leonis". In David Thomas; Alex Mallett (eds.). Christian–Muslim Relations: A Bibliographical History. Vol. 4 (1200–1350). Brill. pp. 124–127.
- Brandes, Wolfram (2013). "Cento of the True Emperor". In David Thomas; Alex Mallett (eds.). Christian–Muslim Relations: A Bibliographical History. Vol. 5 (1350–1500). Brill. pp. 330–333.
- Brokkaar, W. G., ed. (2002). Sapientissimi imperatoris Leonis oracula & anonymi narratio de vero imperatore: The Oracles of the Most Wise Emperor Leo & The Tale of the True Emperor (Amstelodamensis graecus VI E 8). Amsterdam.
- De Maria, Blake (2013). "Jacopo Foscarini, Francesco Barozzi, and the Oracles of Leo the Wise". In Nebahat Avcioğlu; Emma Jones (eds.). Architecture, Art and Identity in Venice and its Territories, 1450–1750: Essays in Honour of Deborah Howard. Ashgate. pp. 219–229.
- Mango, Cyril (1984). "The Legend of Leo the Wise". Byzantium and Its Image: History and Culture of the Byzantine Empire and Its Heritage. pp. 59–93. Originally published in Zbornik radova vizantiloškog instituta 6 (1960), same pagination.
- Mesler, Katelyn (2007). "Imperial Prophecy and Papal Crisis: The Latin Reception of The Prophecy of the True Emperor". Rivista di Storia della Chiesa in Italia. 61: 371–415.
- Miltenova, Anissava (2014). "Historical Apocalypses in Medieval Bulgarian Literature (10th–14th Centuries)". In Kevork Bardakjian; Sergio La Porta (eds.). The Armenian Apocalyptic Tradition: A Comparative Perspective. Brill. pp. 706–729.
- Rigo, Antonio, ed. (1988). Oracula Leonis. Editoriale Programma.
