= Saint Malachy =

Irish Saint (1094–1148)

Saint Máel Máedóc Ua Morgair
- Archbishop of Armagh
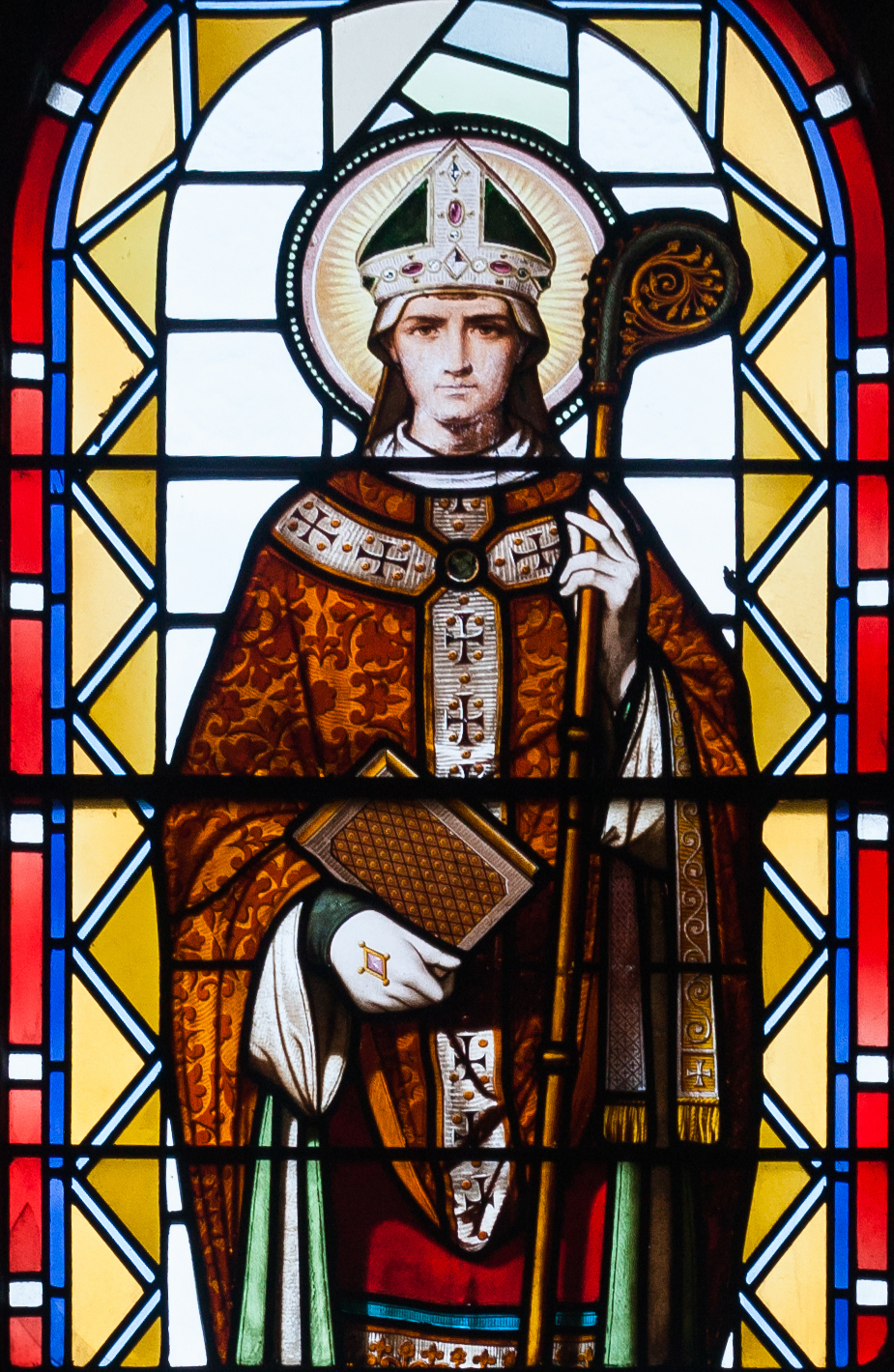
- Saint Malachy pictured in a stained glass window, Sligo Cathedral of the Immaculate Conception
- See: Archdiocese of Armagh
- In office: 1132–1136/37
- Predecessor: Celsus
- Successor: Gelasius
- Previous posts: Bishop of Down (1124–1148) and Bishop of Connor (1124–1136/37); Abbot of Bangor

Orders
- Consecration: 1124

Personal details
- Born: 1094 Armagh, Airgíalla, Ireland
- Died: 2 November 1148 (aged 53–54) Clairvaux, Champagne, France

Malachy (/ˈmæləki/; Middle Irish: Máel Máedóc Ua Morgair; Modern Irish: Maolmhaodhóg Ó Morgair; Latin: Malachias) (1094 – 2 November 1148) is an Irish saint who was Archbishop of Armagh, to whom were attributed several miracles and an alleged vision of 112 popes later attributed to the apocryphal (i.e. of doubtful authenticity) Prophecy of the Popes.

Malachy was the first native-born Irish saint to be formally canonised. His brother was Gilla Críst Ua Morgair, who was Bishop Christian of Clogher from 1126 to 1138.

== Life ==
Máel Máedóc, whose surname was Ua Morgair, was born in Armagh in 1094. Bernard of Clairvaux describes him as having noble birth. He was baptized Máel Máedóc, meaning 'devotee or servant' of Máedóc (Máedóc of Ferns) which was rendered Malachus in Latin (and subsequently as Malachy in English) and was trained under the famous recluse Imhar O'Hagan, subsequently Abbot of Armagh. Imhar was in sympathy with the aims of those who sought to reform the Irish church, and it was probably through his influence that Malachy became imbued with their principles. After a long course of studies, Malachy was ordained priest by Cellach of Armagh (Celsus) in 1119.

Shortly afterwards Cellach made the young priest his vicar. For the next year or two it was Malachy's duty to administer the diocese of Armagh. He established in all the churches the apostolic sanctions and the decrees of the holy fathers, and the customs and practices of the Roman Church. With the consent of Cellach and Imar, he went to study under Máel Ísu Ua hAinmere (Malchus, first Bishop of the Norse city of Waterford), who had by this time retired from the archbishopric of Cashel and was settled at Lismore. He spent three years there.

== Abbot of Bangor ==
In 1123 the coarb of Bangor Abbey died. Bangor was the principal religious site in the north-east of Ireland. Since he ended his days at Lismore, it may be assumed that he was a friend of Malchus, and of the movement with which he was identified. His successor, who was Malachy's uncle, expressed his willingness to surrender his office and the site of the monastery to his nephew. Malachy became Abbot of Bangor Abbey.

This became an opportunity to implement one of the canons of the Synod of Rathbreasail, by establishing the diocese of Connor. Cellach, as coarb of Patrick, and consecrated bishop, had been able to organize the diocese of Armagh in accordance with the Rathbreasail plan. With the prestige which belonged to the coarb of Comgall, Malachy, if consecrated bishop, could probably succeed in organizing the diocese of Connor. In 1124 Malachy journeyed to Bangor, was installed as abbot, and was made bishop by Cellach.

In 1132, he was promoted to the primacy of Armagh.

Bernard provides many interesting anecdotes regarding Malachy and highly praises Malachy's zeal for religion both in Connor and Armagh. In 1127, Malachy paid a second visit to Lismore and acted for a time as confessor to Cormac MacCarthy, Prince of Desmond. While Bishop of Down and Connor, Malachy continued to reside at Bangor, and when some of the native princes sacked the two dioceses of Down and Connor, Malachy brought the Bangor monks to Iveragh, County Kerry, where they were welcomed by now King Cormac. On the death of Celsus (who was buried at Lismore in 1129), Malachy was appointed Archbishop of Armagh, in 1132, which dignity he accepted with great reluctance. Owing to intrigues, he was unable to take possession of his See for two years; even then he had to purchase the Bachal Isu (Staff of Jesus) from Niall, the usurping lay-primate.

Malachy's influence in Irish ecclesiastical affairs has been compared with that of Boniface in Germany. During three years at Armagh, as Bernard of Clairvaux writes, Malachy restored the discipline of the church, grown lax during the intruded rule of a series of lay-abbots, and had the Roman Liturgy adopted. Malachy worked zealously to restore ecclesiastical discipline, restored marriage, renewed the practices of confession and confirmation, and introduced Roman chants in the liturgy. He was also known for his care to the needy as a miracle worker and healer. In his lifetime, he planted apple trees throughout Ireland during times of famine.

Bernard continues: Having extirpated barbarism and re-established Christian morals, and seeing all things tranquil, Malachy began to think of his own peace. He, therefore, resigned the Sees of Armagh and Connor, in 1136 or 1137, but retained as Bishop of Down. He founded a priory of Austin Canons at Downpatrick, and was unceasing in his episcopal labours. Early in 1139 he journeyed to Rome, via Scotland, England, and France, visiting Bernard at Clairvaux, Champagne. He petitioned Pope Innocent II for pallia for the Sees of Armagh and Cashel, and was appointed legate for Ireland. On his return visit to Clairvaux, he obtained five monks for a foundation in Ireland, under Christian, an Irishman, as superior: thus arose the great Abbey of Mellifont in 1142. Malachy set out on a second journey to Rome in 1148, but on arriving at Clairvaux, he fell sick and died in the arms of Bernard, on 2 November 1148.

== Veneration ==
Saint Malachy
- Canonized: 1190 by Pope Clement III
- Feast: 3 November
- Patronage: Archdiocese of Armagh, Diocese of Down and Connor

In the book Life of Saint Malachy, his biographer Bernard of Clairvaux says Malachy was distinguished by his meekness, humility, obedience, modesty, and true diligence in his studies. Charles Borromeo praised Malachy for attending to the needy, bringing the holy sacraments to all alike and renewing the fervour of the people in receiving them.

Malachy's feast is celebrated on 3 November, so as not to clash with All Souls Day.

== Visio Tnugdali ==
The Visio Tnugdali written c.1149 refers to Malachy as follows- "When Saint Ruadan had fallen silent, Tundale looked happily about him and saw Saint Patrick of Ireland, dressed in shining robes alongside many bishops decked out in their finest regalia. They were all joyful and there was no sound of any sighing! Among that blessed company Tundale could see four bishops whom he recognised. They were all good men; one of them was Saint Cellach, a former archbishop of Armagh, who did much good for the sake of Our Lord. Another was Malachias O'Moore, who had become archbishop of Armagh after him and gave everything that he had to the poor. He founded a large number of churches and colleges, as many as forty-four in all, endowed them with land and rents and so allowed many men of religion to serve God devotedly, although he hardly retained enough for himself to live on."

== Relics ==
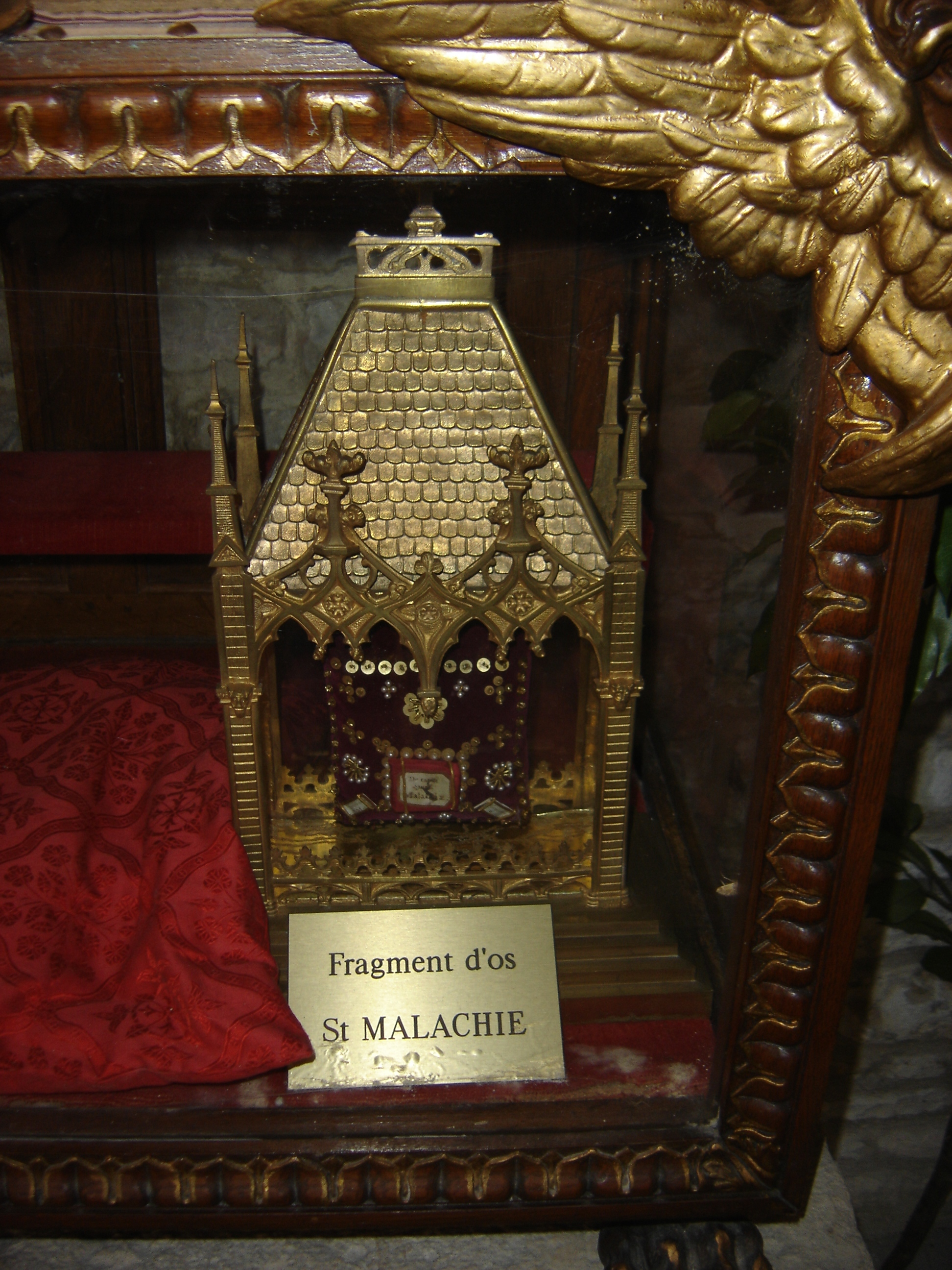
Bone fragment of St Malachy, Clairvaux Abbey

Malachy's body remained at Clairvaux Abbey and eventually was placed in a tomb near Bernard of Clairvaux's, after the abbot's own death. The tomb was moved several times with the rebuilding of the church. Portions of his remains were sent to Ireland in 1194 and deposited at Mellifont Abbey and other abbeys of the Cistercians. At some point at Clairvaux, part of Malachy's arm and part of his skull were removed and placed in special reliquaries in the abbey's treasury. His arm was kept in a silver case decorated with precious stones. A portion of his skull was kept in a bust reliquary of gilt silver, also decorated with precious stones and topped by a mitre. These reliquaries may have been enamelled or painted. During the French Revolution, the reliquaries themselves were destroyed, although the relics were preserved. Malachy's head is now preserved in a reliquary in the treasury of Troyes Cathedral, not far from the site of Clairvaux. The tombs of the two friends were destroyed in the aftermath of the revolution, and the bones were commingled and distributed to various parishes in the district of Clairvaux. Ph. Guignard published an account of the relics in the Patrologia Latina.

== Patronage ==
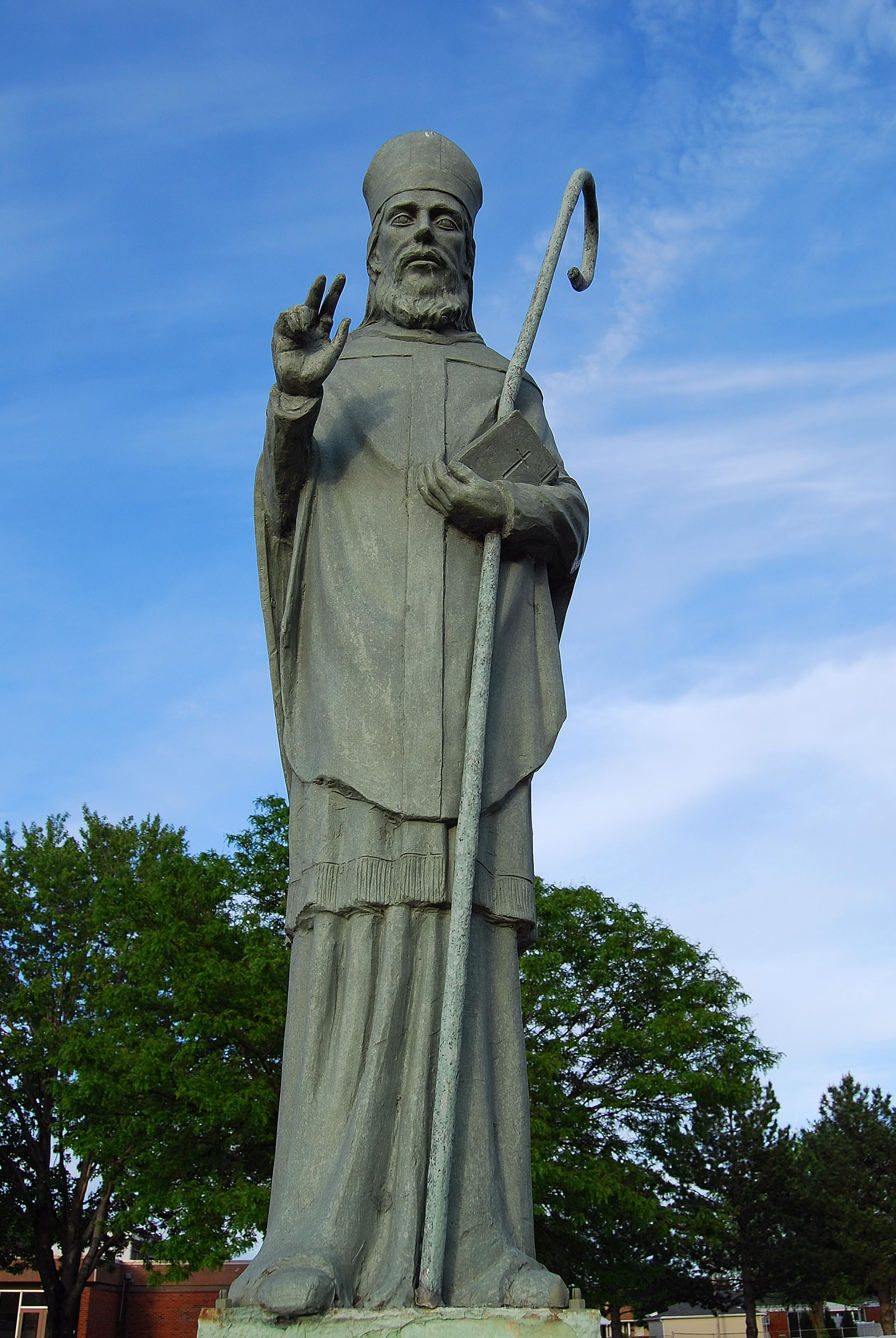
Statue of Malachy, Sterling Heights, Michigan

Malachy is patron saint of the Archdiocese of Armagh and the Diocese of Down and Connor. The Dominican Abbey at Carlingford (est. 1305) was dedicated to him and his legacy. Saint Malachy's Church, Belfast was intended to be the Cathedral Church of Down and Connor dedicated in honour of the Diocesan Patron. However, the Irish Famine broke out and the grand plans for Saint Malachy's Cathedral were shelved to divert funds to the needy.

A number of parishes are dedicated to Malachy, including those in Tehachapi, California; Brownsburg, Indiana; Burlington, Massachusetts; Kennedy Township, New York City (The Actors' Chapel); Philadelphia, Pennsylvania, Geneseo, Illinois and Rantoul, Illinois.

== Prophecy of the Popes ==
A "Prophecy of the Popes" is attributed to Malachy, which is claimed to predict that there would be only 112 more popes before the Last Judgment. Benedictine Arnold de Wyon discovered and published the so-called "Doomsday Prophecy" in 1590. Most scholars consider the document a 16th-century elaborate hoax. James Weiss, a professor of church history at Boston College, has stated: "It is widely thought ... given who the author was and his relationship, [that the prophecies] were published to establish the case for election of one particular cardinal." Thomas Groome, chair of the Department of Religious Education and Pastoral Ministry at Boston College, has a similar notion: "For myself – and even as a native Irishman – the 'Prophecies of St. Malachy' are a grand old fun tale that have about as much reliability as the morning horoscope". Thomas J. Reese of Georgetown University, had only this to say: "St. Malachy's prophecy is nonsense."

== In popular culture ==
Malachy, his "Doomsday Prophecy", and the conflicts between the Christians and pagans are important plot points in James Rollins' sixth Sigma Force novel, The Doomsday Key (2009), particularly in Chapter 21.

== See also ==
- Vaticinia Nostradami
- Saint Malachy's Church, Belfast
- Prophecy of the Popes
