= William Wace =

Irish clergyman and bishop

William Wace was an Irish clergyman and bishop for the Roman Catholic Diocese of Waterford. He was appointed bishop in 1223.
