= Prophecy of the Popes =

Cryptic phrases purporting to predict popes

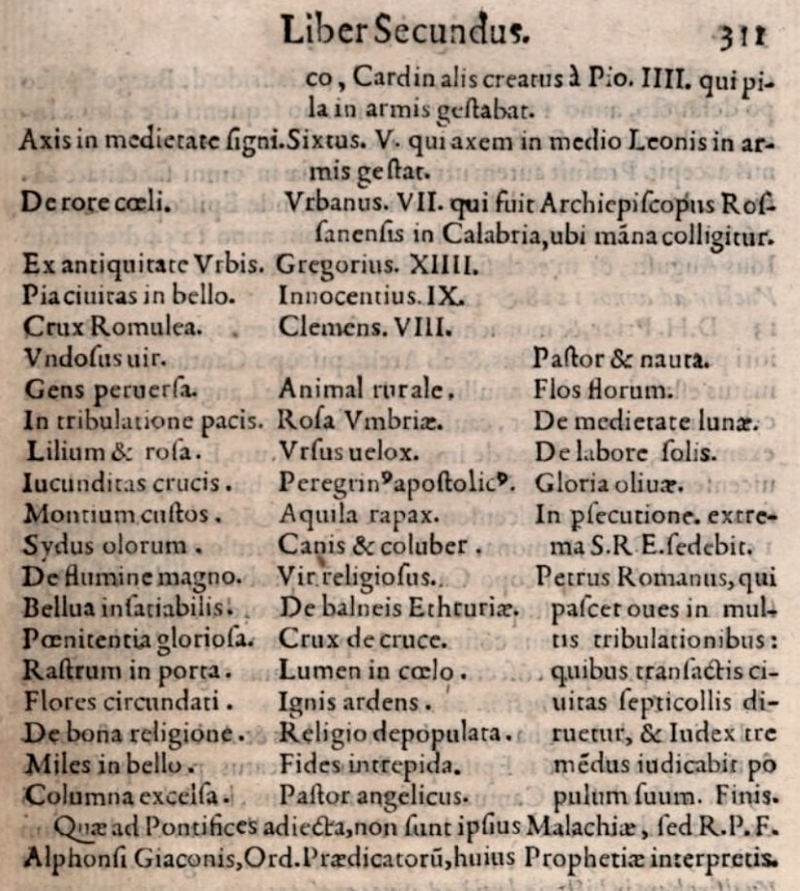
Final part of the prophecies in Lignum Vitæ (1595), p. 311

The Prophecy of the Popes (Latin: Prophetia Sancti Malachiae Archiepiscopi, de Summis Pontificibus, "Prophecy of Saint-Archbishop Malachy, concerning the Supreme Pontiffs") is a series of 112 short, cryptic phrases in Latin which purport to predict popes (along with a few antipopes) of the Catholic Church, beginning with Celestine II. It was first published in 1595 by Benedictine monk Arnold Wion, who attributed the prophecy to Saint Malachy, a 12th-century Archbishop of Armagh.

Given the accurate description of popes up to around 1590 and lack of accuracy for the popes that follow, historians generally conclude the alleged prophecy is a pseudepigraphic fabrication written shortly before publication. The Catholic Church has no official stance, although some Catholic theologians have dismissed it as forgery. The prophecy concludes with a pope identified as "Peter the Roman", whose pontificate will allegedly precede the destruction of the city of Rome and the Last Judgment.

== History ==
=== Publication and content ===
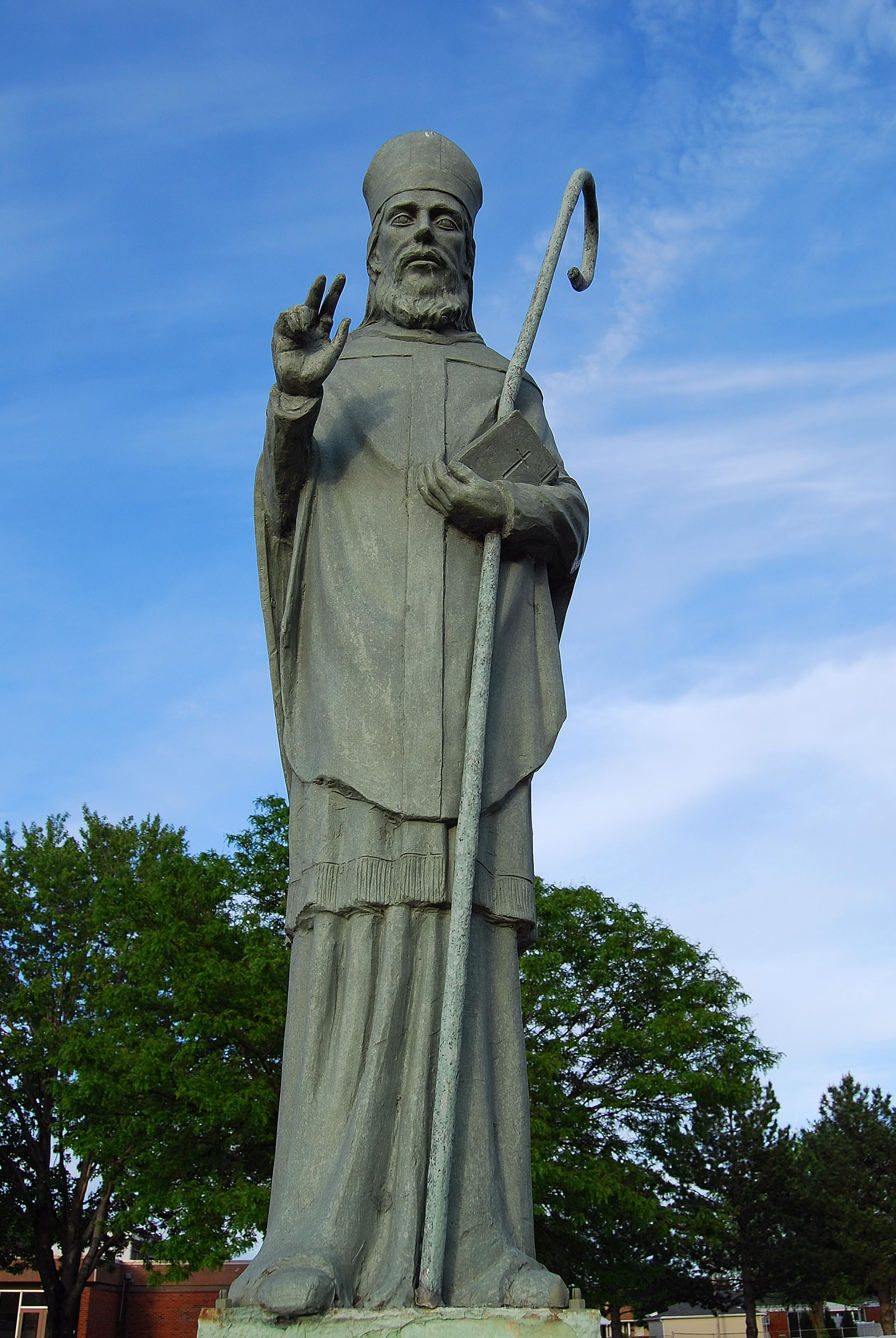
Statue of Saint Malachy (1094–1148), to whom Wion attributes the authorship of the prophecies. Malachy died over four centuries before the prophecies first appeared.

The alleged prophecy was first published in 1595 by a Benedictine named Arnold Wion in his Lignum Vitæ, a history of the Benedictine order. He attributed it to Saint Malachy, the 12th‑century Archbishop of Armagh. Wion explained that the prophecy had not, to his knowledge, ever been printed before but that many were eager to see it. He includes both the alleged original prophecy, consisting of short, cryptic Latin phrases, as well as an interpretation applying the statements to historical popes up to Urban VII (pope for thirteen days in 1590), which Wion attributes to historian Alphonsus Ciacconius.

=== Origin theories ===
According to an account put forward in 1871 by Abbé Cucherat, Malachy was summoned to Rome in 1139 by Pope Innocent II to receive two wool palliums for the metropolitan sees of Armagh and Cashel. While in Rome, Malachy purportedly experienced a vision of future popes, which he recorded as a sequence of cryptic phrases. This manuscript was then allegedly deposited in the Vatican Secret Archives, and forgotten about until its rediscovery in 1590, supposedly just in time for a papal conclave occurring at the time.

Several historians have concluded that the prophecy is a late 16th‑century forgery. Saint Bernard of Clairvaux, a contemporary biographer of Malachy who recorded the saint's alleged miracles, makes no mention of the prophecy. The earliest known reference to them dates to 1587. Spanish monk and scholar Benito Jerónimo Feijóo y Montenegro wrote in his Teatro Crítico Universal (1724–1739), in an entry called Purported prophecies, that the high level of accuracy of the verses up until the date they were published, compared with their high level of inaccuracy after that date, is evidence that they were created around the time of publication. The verses and explanations given by Wion correspond very closely to a 1557 history of the popes by Onofrio Panvinio (including replication of errors made by Panvinio), which may indicate that the prophecy was written based on that source. In 1694, Claude-François Menestrier argued the additional interpretive statements were not written by Ciacconius, as the prophecy was not mentioned in any of Ciacconius' works, nor were the interpretive statements listed among his works.

One theory to explain the prophecy's creation, put forward by 17th-century French priest and encyclopaedist Louis Moréri, among others, is that it was spread by supporters of Cardinal Girolamo Simoncelli in support of his bid to become pope during the 1590 conclave to replace Urban VII. In the prophecy, the pope following Urban VII is given the description "Ex antiquitate Urbis" ("from the old city"), and Simoncelli was from Orvieto, which in Latin is Urbevetanum, "old city". Moréri and others proposed the prophecy was created in an unsuccessful attempt to demonstrate that Simoncelli was destined to be pope. However, the discovery of a reference to the prophecy in a 1587 letter has cast doubt on this theory. In this document the entourage of Cardinal Giovanni Girolamo Albani interprets the motto De rore coeli ("From the dew of the sky") as a reference to their master, on the base of the link between alba ("dawn") and Albani, and the dew, as a typical morning atmospheric phenomenon.

== Interpretation ==
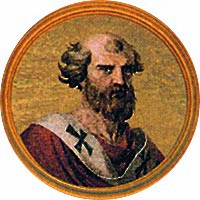
Celestine II (d. 1144), the first pope mentioned in the prophecies

The interpretation of the entries for pre-publication popes provided by Wion involves close correspondences between the mottos and the popes' birthplaces, family names, personal arms, and pre-papal titles. For example, the first motto, Ex castro Tiberis ("from a castle on the Tiber"), fits Celestine II's birthplace in Città di Castello, on the Tiber. Efforts to connect the prophecy to historical popes who were elected after its publication have been more strained. For example, Clement XIII is referred to as Rosa Umbriae ("the rose of Umbria") but was not from Umbria nor had he any but the most marginal connection with the region, having been briefly pontifical governor of Rieti, at the time part of Umbria. One writer notes that among the post-publication (post-1595) popes there remain "some surprisingly appropriate phrases", while adding that "it is of course easy to exaggerate the list's accuracy by simply citing its successes", and that "other tags do not fit so neatly".

Among the reported "successes" are "Light in the sky" for Leo XIII (1878–1903), with a comet in his coat of arms; "Religion depopulated" for Benedict XV (1914–22) whose papacy included World War I and the Russian Revolution; and "Flower of flowers" for Paul VI (1963–78), with three fleurs-de-lis in his coat of arms. Peter Bander, then-Head of Religious Education at Wall Hall teacher training college, wrote in 1969:

If we were to place the works of those who have repudiated the Prophecies of Malachy on scales and balance them against those who have accepted them, we would probably reach a fair equilibrium; however, the most important factor, namely the popularity of the prophecies, particularly among the ordinary people (as distinct from scholars), makes them as relevant to the second half of the twentieth century as they have ever been.

— Bander (1969), p. 10.

M. J. O'Brien, a Catholic priest who authored an 1880 monograph on the prophecy, provided a more scathing assessment:

These prophecies have served no purpose. They are absolutely meaningless. The Latin is bad. It is impossible to attribute such absurd triflings ... to any holy source. Those who have written in defence of the prophecy ... have brought forward scarcely an argument in their favour. Their attempts at explaining the prophecies after 1590 are, I say with all respect, the sorriest trifling.

— O'Brien (1880), p. 110.

=== Petrus Romanus ===
In recent times, some interpreters of prophetic literature have drawn attention to the prophecy due to its imminent conclusion; if the list of descriptions is matched on a one-to-one basis to the list of historic popes since publication, Benedict XVI (2005–13) would correspond to the second to last of the papal descriptions, Gloria olivae (the glory of the olive). The longest and final verse predicts the Apocalypse:

In persecutione extrema S.R.E. sedebit. Petrus Romanus, qui pascet oves in multis tribulationibus, quibus transactis civitas septicollis diruetur, & judex tremendus judicabit populum suum. Finis.

This may be translated into English thus:

In the final persecution of the Holy Roman Church, there will sit [i.e., as bishop]. Peter the Roman, who will pasture his sheep in many tribulations, and when these things are finished, the city of seven hills [i.e. Rome] will be destroyed, and the dreadful judge (Note: or a dreadful judge; Latin does not distinguish definite and indefinite articles) will judge his people. The End.

Several historians and interpreters note the prophecy leaves open the possibility of unlisted popes between "the glory of the olive" and the final pope, "Peter the Roman". In the Lignum Vitae, the line In persecutione extrema S.R.E. sedebit. forms a separate sentence and paragraph of its own. While often read as part of the "Peter the Roman" entry, other interpreters view it as a separate, incomplete sentence explicitly referring to one or more popes between "the glory of the olive" and "Peter the Roman".

== Mottos and corresponding popes ==
The list can be divided into two groups; one of the popes and antipopes who reigned prior to the appearance of the prophecy c. 1590, for whom the connection between the motto and the pope is consistently clear. The other is of mottos attributed to popes who have reigned since its appearance, for whom the connection between the motto and the pope is often strained or totally absent and could be viewed as shoehorning or postdiction. The list has most commonly been divided between mottos 74 and 75, based on the mottos that were explained by Wion and those that were not. Lorenzo Comensoli Antonini divides the list between mottos 73 and 74, based on the loose connection between Urban VII and the motto "From the dew of the sky", and the reference to the prophecy in a 1587 letter, prior to Urban VII's papacy.

René Thibaut divides the table at a different point, between the 71st and 72nd motto, asserting a stylistic change at this point. He uses this distinction to put forward the view that the first 71 mottos are post-dated forgeries, while the remainder are genuine. Hildebrand Troll echoes this view, noting that mottos 72–112 use a symbolic language related to the character of the pope and his papacy, in contrast to the more literal mottos for earlier popes.

In 2021, historian Hermann Joseph Hiery proposed a different correspondence of popes to the aphorisms of the 1595 publication by removing three of the seven antipopes: Alexander V, John XXIII, and Felix V, which leaves two more popes to come after Leo XIV.

=== Pre-publication popes and antipopes (1143–1590) ===
The text on the silver rows below reproduces the original text (including punctuation and orthography) of the 1595 Lignum Vitae, which consisted of three parallel columns for the popes before 1590. The first column contained the motto, the second the name of the pope or antipope to whom it was attached (with occasional errors), the third an explanation of the motto, and the fourth a depiction of each pope’s coat-of-arms. There are some indications that both the mottos and explanations were the work of a single 16th-century person. The original list was unnumbered.

Pre-publication popes and antipopes (1143–1590)
Motto no.	Motto (translation)	Regnal name (reign)	Name	Explanation provided in Lignum Vitae	Coat of arms
Ex caſtro Tiberis.		Cœleſtinus. ij.		Typhernas.	
1.	From a castle of the Tiber	Celestine II (1143–1144)	Guido di Castello	An inhabitant of Tifernum. Celestine II was born in Città di Castello (formerly called Tifernum-Tiberinum), on the banks of the Tiber.	
Inimicus expulſus.		Lucius. ij.		De familia Caccianemica.	
2.	Enemy expelled	Lucius II (1144–1145)	Gherardo Caccianemici dall'Orso	Of the Caccianemici family. According to Wion, this motto refers to Lucius II's family name, Caccianemici; in Italian, "Cacciare" means "to drive out" and "nemici" means "enemies." While he has been traditionally viewed as being part of this family, it is doubtful whether he actually was; moreover, even if he actually belonged to that family, the attribution of the surname "Caccianemici" is certainly anachronistic.	
Ex magnitudine mõtis.		Eugenius. iij.		Patria Ethruſcus oppido Montis magni.	
3.	From the great mountain	Eugene III (1145–1153)	Bernardo Pignatelli	Tuscan by nation, from the town of Montemagno. According to Wion, the motto refers to Eugene III's birthplace, "Montemagno," a village near Pisa. But according to other sources he was born in Pisa into a modest family.	
Abbas Suburranus.		Anaſtaſius. iiij.		De familia Suburra.	
4.	Abbot from Subbura	Anastasius IV (1153–1154)	Corrado Demetri della Suburra	From the Suburra family. He was traditionally referred to as abbot of the canon regulars of St. Ruf in Avignon, but modern scholars have established that he actually belonged to the secular clergy.	
De rure albo.		Adrianus. iiij.		Vilis natus in oppido Sancti Albani.	
5.	From the white countryside	Adrian IV (1154–1159)	Nicholas Breakspear	Humbly born in the town of St. Albans. Most likely a reference to Adrian IV's birthplace near St Albans, Hertfordshire.	
Ex tetro carcere.		Victor. iiij.		Fuit Cardinalis S. Nicolai in carcere Tulliano.	
6.	Out of a loathsome prison.	Victor IV, antipope (1159–1164)	Ottaviano dei Crescenzi Ottaviani di Monticelli	He was a cardinal of St. Nicholas in the Tullian prison. Victor IV may have held the title San Nicola in Carcere.	
Via Tranſtiberina.		Calliſtus. iij. [sic]		Guido Cremenſis Cardinalis S. Mariæ Tranſtiberim.	
7.	Road across the Tiber.	Callixtus III, antipope (1168–1178)	Giovanni di Struma	Guido of Crema, Cardinal of St. Mary across the Tiber. Wion reverses the names and order of Antipopes Callixtus III (John of Struma) and Paschal III (Guido of Crema). Paschal, not Callixtus, was born Guido of Crema and held the title of Santa Maria in Trastevere, to which the motto applies.	
De Pannonia Thuſciæ.		Paſchalis. iij. [sic]		Antipapa. Hungarus natione, Epiſcopus Card. Tuſculanus.	
8.	From Tusculan Hungary.	Paschal III, antipope (1164–1168)	Guido di Crema	Antipope. A Hungarian by birth, Cardinal Bishop of Tusculum. As noted above, this motto applies not to Paschal III, but to Callixtus III, who allegedly was Hungarian. However, Callixtus was Cardinal Bishop of Albano, not of Tusculum.	
Ex anſere cuſtode.		Alexander. iij.		De familia Paparona.	
9.	From the guardian goose	Alexander III (1159–1181)	Rolando Bandinelli	Of the Paparoni family. Alexander III may have been from the Bandinelli family, which was afterwards known as the Paparona family, which featured a goose on its coat of arms. There is debate whether Alexander III was in fact of that family.	
Lux in oſtio.		Lucius. iij.		Lucenſis Card. Oſtienſis.	
10.	A light in the door	Lucius III (1181–1185)	Ubaldo Allucingoli	A Luccan Cardinal of Ostia. The motto is a wordplay on "Lucius" or "Lucca" and "Ostia."	
Sus in cribro.		Vrbanus. iij.		Mediolanenſis, familia cribella, quæ Suem pro armis gerit.	
11.	Pig in a sieve	Urban III (1185–1187)	Umberto Crivelli	A Milanese, of the Cribella (Crivelli) family, which bears a pig for arms. Urban III's family name "Crivelli" means "a sieve" in Italian; his arms included a sieve and two pigs.	
Enſis Laurentii.		Gregorius. viij.		Card. S. Laurentii in Lucina, cuius inſignia enſes falcati.	
12.	The sword of Lawrence	Gregory VIII (1187)	Alberto de Morra	Cardinal of St. Lawrence in Lucina, of whom the arms were curved swords. Gregory VIII was Cardinal of St. Lawrence and his arms featured crossed swords.	
De Schola exiet. (Note: A non-standard verb form, replacing classical exhibit.)		Clemens. iij.		Romanus, domo Scholari.	
13.	He will come from school	Clement III (1187–1191)	Paolo Scolari	A Roman, of the house of Scolari. The motto is a play on words on Clement III's surname.	
De rure bouenſi.		Cœleſtinus. iij.		Familia Bouenſi.	
14.	From cattle country	Celestine III (1191–1198)	Giacinto Bobone Orsini	Bovensis family. The reference to cattle is a wordplay on Celestine III's surname, Bobone.	
Comes Signatus.		Innocentius. iij.		Familia Comitum Signiæ.	
15.	Designated count	Innocent III (1198–1216)	Lotario dei Conti di Segni	Family of the Counts of Signia (Segni); The motto is a direct reference to Innocent III's family name.	
Canonicus de latere.		Honorius. iij.		Familia Sabella, Canonicus S. Ioannis Lateranensis.	
16.	Canon from the side	Honorius III (1216–1227)	Cencio Savelli	Savelli family, canon of St. John Lateran; The claim in Wion that Honorius III was a canon of St. John Lateran is contested by some historians.	
Auis Oſtienſis.		Gregorius. ix.		Familia Comitum Signiæ Epiſcopus Card. Oſtienſis.	
17.	Bird of Ostia	Gregory IX (1227–1241)	Ugolino dei Conti di Segni	Family of the Counts of Segni, Cardinal Bishop of Ostia. Before his election to the papacy, Ugolino dei Conti was the Cardinal Bishop of Ostia, and his coat of arms depict an eagle.	
Leo Sabinus.		Cœleſtinus iiij.		Mediolanenſis, cuius inſignia Leo, Epiſcopus Card. Sabinus.	
18.	Sabine Lion	Celestine IV (1241)	Goffredo Castiglioni	A Milanese, whose arms were a lion, Cardinal Bishop of Sabina. Celestine IV was Cardinal Bishop of Sabina and his armorial bearing had a lion in it.	
Comes Laurentius.		Innocentius iiij.		domo flisca, Comes Lauaniæ, Cardinalis S. Laurentii in Lucina.	
19.	Count of Lawrence	Innocent IV (1243–1254)	Sinibaldo Fieschi	Of the house of Flisca (Fieschi), Count of Lavagna, Cardinal of St. Lawrence in Lucina. The motto, as explained in Wion, is a reference to Innocent IV's father, the Count of Lavagna, and his title Cardinal of St. Lawrence in Lucina.	
Signum Oſtienſe.		Alexander iiij.		De comitibus Signiæ, Epiſcopus Card. Oſtienſis.	
20.	Sign of Ostia	Alexander IV (1254–1261)	Rinaldo dei Conti di Segni	Of the counts of Segni, Cardinal Bishop of Ostia. The motto refers to Alexander IV's being Cardinal Bishop of Ostia and a family member of the Counts of Segni (Conti di Segni).	
Hieruſalem Campanię.		Vrbanus iiii.		Gallus, Trecenſis in Campania, Patriarcha Hieruſalem.	
21.	Jerusalem of Champagne	Urban IV (1261–1264)	Jacques Pantaléon	A Frenchman, of Trecae (Troyes) in Champagne, Patriarch of Jerusalem. The motto refers to Urban IV's birthplace of Troyes, Champagne, and title Patriarch of Jerusalem.	
Draco depreſſus.		Clemens iiii.		cuius inſignia Aquila vnguibus Draconem tenens.	
22.	Dragon pressed down	Clement IV (1265–1268)	Gui Foucois	Whose badge is an eagle holding a dragon in his talons. According to some sources, Clement IV's coat of arms depicted an eagle clawing a dragon. Other sources indicate that it was instead six fleurs-de-lis.	
Anguinus uir.		Gregorius. x.		Mediolanenſis, Familia vicecomitum, quæ anguẽ pro inſigni gerit.	
23.	Snaky man	Gregory X (1271–1276)	Teobaldo Visconti	A Milanese, of the family of Viscounts (Visconti), which bears a snake for arms. The coat of arms of the Visconti of Milan had a large serpent devouring a male child feet first; sources conflict as to whether Gregory X used this for his papal arms.	
Concionator Gallus.		Innocentius. v.		Gallus, ordinis Prædicatorum.	
24.	French Preacher	Innocent V (1276)	Pierre de Tarentaise	A Frenchman, of the Order of Preachers. Innocent V was born in what is now south-eastern France and was a member of the order of Preachers.	
Bonus Comes.		Adrianus. v.		Ottobonus familia Fliſca ex comitibus Lauaniæ.	
25.	Good Count	Adrian V (1276)	Ottobuono Fieschi	Ottobono, of the Fieschi family, from the counts of Lavagna. The Fieschi family were counts of Lavagna and a wordplay on "good" can be made with Adrian V's first name, Ottobuono.	
Piſcator Thuſcus.		Ioannes. xxi.		antea Ioannes Petrus Epiſcopus Card. Tuſculanus.	
26.	Tuscan Fisherman	John XXI (1276–1277)	Pedro Julião	Formerly John Peter, Cardinal Bishop of Tusculum. John XXI had been the Cardinal Bishop of Tusculum, and shared his first name with Saint Peter, a fisherman.	
Roſa compoſita.		Nicolaus. iii.		Familia Vrſina, quæ roſam in inſigni gerit, dictus compoſitus.	
27.	Composite Rose	Nicholas III (1277–1280)	Giovanni Gaetano Orsini	Of the Ursina (Orsini) family, which bears a rose on its arms, called 'composite'. Nicholas III bore a rose in his coat of arms.	
Ex teloneo liliacei Martini.		Martinus. iiii.		cuius inſignia lilia, canonicus, & theſaurarius S. Martini Turonen[sis].	
28.	From the tollhouse of Martin of the lilies	Martin IV (1281–1285)	Simon de Brion	Whose arms were lilies, canon and treasurer of St. Martin of Tours. Martin IV was Canon and Treasurer at the Church of St. Martin in Tours, France. Wion's assertion that his arms featured lilies is incorrect.	
Ex roſa leonina.		Honorius. iiii.		Familia Sabella inſignia roſa à leonibus geſtata.	
29.	Out of the leonine rose	Honorius IV (1285–1287)	Giacomo Savelli	Of the Sabella (Savelli) family, arms were a rose carried by lions. Honorius IV's coat of arms was emblazoned with two lions supporting a rose.	
Picus inter eſcas.		Nicolaus. iiii.		Picenus patria Eſculanus.	
30.	Woodpecker between food	Nicholas IV (1288–1292)	Girolamo Masci	A Picene by nation, of Asculum (Ascoli). The motto is likely an obscure wordplay on Nicholas IV's birthplace in Ascoli, in Picenum.	
Ex eremo celſus.		Cœleſtinus. v.		Vocatus Petrus de morrone Eremita.	
31.	Raised out of the desert	Celestine V (1294)	Pietro Angelerio da Morrone	Called Peter de Morrone, a hermit. Prior to his election, Celestine V was a hermit (eremita, literally a dweller in the eremus, or desert).	
Ex undarũ bn̑dictione.		Bonifacius. viii.		Vocatus prius Benedictus, Caetanus, cuius inſignia undæ.	
32.	From the blessing of the waves	Boniface VIII (1294–1303)	Benedetto Caetani	Previously called Benedict, of Gaeta, whose arms were waves. Boniface VIII's coat of arms had a wave through it. Also a play on words, referring to the pope's Christian name, "Benedetto".	
Concionator patereus. [sic]		Benedictus. xi.		qui uocabatur Frater Nicolaus, ordinis Prædicatorum.	
33.	Preacher From Patara	Benedict XI (1303–1304)	Niccolò Boccasini	Who was called Brother Nicholas, of the order of Preachers. Benedict XI belonged to the Order of Preachers, and his namesake Saint Nicholas was from Patara, the capital of Lycia. O'Brien notes, "Everything leads us to suspect that the author and interpreter of the prophecy is one and the same person. The pretended interpreter who knew that Patare was the birthplace of St. Nicholas forgot that others may not be aware of the fact, and that therefore the explanation would be thrown away on them."	
De feſſis aquitanicis.		Clemens V.		natione aquitanus, cuius inſignia feſſæ erant.	
34.	From the fesses of Aquitaine	Clement V (1305–1314)	Raymond Bertrand de Got	An Aquitanian by birth, whose arms were fesses. Clement V was Bishop of St-Bertrand-de-Comminges in Aquitaine, and eventually became Archbishop of Bordeaux, also in Aquitaine. His coat of arms displays three horizontal bars, known in heraldry as fesses.	
De ſutore oſſeo.		Ioannes XXII.		Gallus, familia Oſſa, Sutoris filius.	
35.	From a bony cobbler	John XXII (1316–1334)	Jacques Duèze	A Frenchman, of the Ossa family, son of a cobbler. John XXII's family name was Duèze or D'Euse, the last of which might be back-translated into Latin as Ossa ("bones"), the name Wion gives. The popular legend that his father was a cobbler is dubious.	
Coruus ſchiſmaticus.		Nicolaus V.		qui uocabatur F. Petrus de corbario, contra Ioannem XXII. Antipapa Minorita.	
36.	Schismatic crow	Nicholas V, antipope (1328–1330)	Pietro Rainalducci	Who was called Brother Peter of Corbarium (Corvaro), the Minorite antipope opposing John XXII. The motto is a play on words, referring to Pietro's birthplace in Corvaro.	
Frigidus Abbas.		Benedictus XII.		Abbas Monaſterii fontis frigidi.	
37.	Cold abbot	Benedict XII (1334–1342)	Jacques Fournier	Abbot of the monastery of the cold spring. Benedict XII was an abbot in the monastery of Fontfroide ("cold spring").	
De roſa Attrebatenſi.		Clemens VI.		Epiſcopus Attrebatenſis, cuius inſignia Roſæ.	
38.	From the rose of Arras	Clement VI (1342–1352)	Pierre Roger	Bishop of Arras, whose arms were roses. Clement VI was Bishop of Arras (in Latin, Episcopus Attrebatensis) and his armorial bearings were emblazoned with six roses.	
De mõtibus Pãmachii.		Innocentius VI.		Cardinalis SS. Ioannis & Pauli. T. Panmachii, cuius inſignia ſex montes erant.	
39.	From the mountains of Pammachius	Innocent VI (1352–1362)	Étienne Aubert	Cardinal of Saints John and Paul, Titulus of Pammachius, whose arms were six mountains. Innocent VI was Cardinal Priest of Pammachius. Wion and Panvinio describe his arms as depicting six mountains, though other sources do not.	
Gallus Vicecomes.		Vrbanus V.		nuncius Apoſtolicus ad Vicecomites Mediolanenſes.	
40.	French viscount	Urban V (1362–1370)	Guillaume de Grimoard	Apostolic nuncio to the Viscounts of Milan. Urban V was French. Wion indicates he was Apostolic Nuncio to the Viscounts of Milan.	
Nouus de uirgine forti.		Gregorius XI.		qui uocabatur Petrus Belfortis, Cardinalis S. Mariæ nouæ.	
41.	New man from the strong virgin	Gregory XI (1370–1378)	Pierre Roger de Beaufort	Who was called Peter Belfortis (Beaufort), Cardinal of New St. Mary's. The motto refers to Gregory XI's surname and his title Cardinal of Santa Maria Nuova.	
Decruce Apoſtolica. [sic]		Clemens VII.		qui fuit Preſbyter Cardinalis SS. XII. Apoſtolorũ cuius inſignia Crux.	
42.	From the apostolic cross	Clement VII, antipope (1378–1394)	Robert de Genève	Who was Cardinal Priest of the Twelve Holy Apostles, whose arms were a cross. Clement VII's coat of arms showed a cross and he held the title Cardinal Priest of the Twelve Holy Apostles.	
Luna Coſmedina.		Benedictus XIII.		antea Petrus de Luna, Diaconus Cardinalis S. Mariæ in Coſmedin.	
43.	Cosmedine moon.	Benedict XIII, antipope (1394–1423)	Pedro Martínez de Luna y Pérez de Gotor	Formerly Peter de Luna, Cardinal Deacon of St. Mary in Cosmedin. The motto refers to Benedict XIII's surname and title.	
Schiſma Barchinoniũ.		Clemens VIII.		Antipapa, qui fuit Canonicus Barchinonenſis.	
44.	Schism of the Barcelonas	Clement VIII, antipope (1423–1429)	Gil Sánchez Muñoz y Carbón	Antipope, who was a canon of Barcelona.	
De inferno prægnãti.		Vrbanus VI.		Neapolitanus Pregnanus, natus in loco quæ dicitur Infernus.	
45.	From a pregnant hell.	Urban VI (1378–1389)	Bartolomeo Prignano	The Neapolitan Prignano, born in a place which is called Inferno. Urban VI's family name was Prignano or Prignani, and he was native to a place called Inferno near Naples.	
Cubus de mixtione.		Bonifacius. IX.		familia tomacella à Genua Liguriæ orta, cuius inſignia Cubi.	
46.	Square of mixture	Boniface IX (1389–1404)	Pietro Cybo Tomacelli	Of the Tomacelli family, born in Genoa in Liguria, whose arms were cubes. Boniface IX's coat of arms includes a bend checky – a wide stripe with a checkerboard pattern.	
De meliore ſydere.		Innocentius. VII.		uocatus Coſmatus de melioratis Sulmonenſis, cuius inſignia ſydus.	
47.	From a better star	Innocent VII (1404–1406)	Cosimo Gentile Migliorati	Called Cosmato dei Migliorati of Sulmo, whose arms were a star. The motto is a play on words, "better" (melior) referring to Innocent VII's last name, Migliorati (Meliorati). There is a shooting star on his coat of arms.	
Nauta de Ponte nigro.		Gregorius XII.		Venetus, commendatarius eccleſiæ Nigropontis.	
48.	Sailor from a black bridge	Gregory XII (1406–1415)	Angelo Correr	A Venetian, commendatary of the church of Negroponte. Gregory XII was born in Venice (hence mariner) and was commendatary of Chalkis, then called Negropont.	
Flagellum ſolis.		Alexander. V.		Græcus Archiepiſcopus Mediolanenſis, inſignia Sol.	
49.	Whip of the sun	Alexander V, antipope (1409–1410)	Pétros Philárgēs	A Greek, Archbishop of Milan, whose arms were a sun. Alexander V's coat of arms featured a sun, the wavy rays may explain the reference to a whip.	
Ceruus Sirenæ.		Ioannes XXIII.		Diaconus Cardinalis S. Euſtachii, qui cum ceruo depingitur, Bononiæ legatus, Neapolitanus.	
50.	Stag of the siren	John XXIII, antipope (1410–1415)	Baldassarre Cossa	Cardinal Deacon of St. Eustace, who is depicted with a stag; legate of Bologna, a Neapolitan. John XXIII was a cardinal with the title of St. Eustachius, whose emblem is a stag, and was originally from Naples, which has the emblem of the siren.	
Corona ueli aurei.		Martinus V.		familia colonna, Diaconus Cardinalis S. Georgii ad uelum aureum.	
51.	Crown of the golden curtain	Martin V (1417–1431)	Oddone Colonna	Of the Colonna family, Cardinal Deacon of St. George at the golden curtain. The motto is a reference to Martin V's family name and cardinal title of San Giorgio in Velabro.	
Lupa Cœleſtina,		Eugenius. IIII.		Venetus, canonicus antea regularis Cœleſtinus, & Epiſcopus Senẽſis.	
52.	Heavenly she-wolf	Eugene IV (1431–1447)	Gabriele Condulmer	A Venetian, formerly a regular Celestine canon, and Bishop of Siena. Eugene IV belonged to the order of the Celestines and was the Bishop of Siena, which bears a she-wolf on its arms.	
Amator Crucis.		Felix. V.		qui uocabatur Amadæus Dux Sabaudiæ, inſignia Crux.	
53.	Lover of the cross	Felix V, antipope (1439–1449)	Amedeo di Savoia	Who was called Amadeus, Duke of Savoy, arms were a cross. The motto is a reference to Felix V's given name, Amadeus, and arms, which featured the cross of Savoy.	
De modicitate Lunæ.		Nicolaus V.		Lunenſis de Sarzana, humilibus parentibus natus.	
54.	From the meanness of Luna	Nicholas V (1447–1455)	Tommaso Parentucelli	A Lunese of Sarzana, born to humble parents. Nicholas V was born in the diocese of Luni, the ancient name of which was Luna.	
Bos paſcens.		Calliſtus. III.		Hiſpanus, cuius inſignia Bos paſcens.	
55.	Pasturing ox	Callixtus III (1455–1458)	Alfonso de Borja	A Spaniard, whose arms were a pasturing ox. Callixtus III was born in Spain and his coat of arms featured an ox.	
De Capra & Albergo.		Pius. II.		Senenſis, qui fuit à Secretis Cardinalibus Capranico & Albergato.	
56.	From a nanny-goat and an inn	Pius II (1458–1464)	Enea Silvio Bartolomeo Piccolomini	A Sienese, who was secretary to Cardinals Capranicus and Albergatus. Pius II was secretary to Cardinal Domenico Capranica and Cardinal Albergatti before he was elected Pope.	
De Ceruo & Leone.		Paulus. II.		Venetus, qui fuit Commendatarius eccleſiæ Ceruienſis, & Cardinalis tituli S. Marci.	
57.	From a stag and lion	Paul II (1464–1471)	Pietro Barbo	A Venetian, who was commendatary of the church of Cervia, and Cardinal of the title of St. Mark. The motto refers to his Bishopric of Cervia (punning on cervus, "a stag") and his cardinal title of St. Mark (symbolized by a winged lion).	
Piſcator minorita.		Sixtus. IIII.		Piſcatoris filius, Franciſcanus.	
58.	Minorite fisherman	Sixtus IV (1471–1484)	Francesco della Rovere	Son of a fisherman, Franciscan. Sixtus IV was born the son of a fisherman and a member of the Franciscans, also known as "Minorites" (founded in 1209, after Malachy's death).	
Præcurſor Siciliæ.		Innocentius VIII.		qui uocabatur Ioãnes Baptiſta, & uixit in curia Alfonſi regis Siciliæ.	
59.	Precursor of Sicily	Innocent VIII (1484–1492)	Giovanni Battista Cybo	Who was called John Baptist, and lived in the court of Alfonso, king of Sicily. Innocent VIII was from Sicily. "Precursor" may be explained as an allusion to his birth name, after John the Baptist, the precursor of Jesus.	
Bos Albanus in portu.		Alexander VI.		Epiſcopus Cardinalis Albanus & Portuenſis, cuius inſignia Bos.	
60.	Bull of Alba in the harbor	Alexander VI (1492–1503)	Roderic Llançol i de Borja	Cardinal Bishop of Albano and Porto, whose arms were a bull. In 1456, he was made a Cardinal and he held the titles of Cardinal Bishop of Albano and Porto, and his arms featured an ox.	
De paruo homine.		Pius. III.		Senenſis, familia piccolominea.	
61.	From a small man	Pius III (1503)	Francesco Todeschini-Piccolomini	A Sienese, of the Piccolomini family. Pius III's family name was Piccolomini, from piccolo "small" and uomo "man".	
Fructus Iouis iuuabit.		Iulius. II.		Ligur, eius inſignia Quercus, Iouis arbor.	
62.	The fruit of Jupiter will help	Julius II (1503–1513)	Giuliano Della Rovere	A Genoese, his arms were an oak, Jupiter's tree. Julius II's arms was an oak tree, the sacred tree of the Roman god Jupiter.	
De craticula Politiana.		Leo. X.		filius Laurentii medicei, & ſcholaris Angeli Politiani.	
63.	From a Politian gridiron	Leo X (1513–1521)	Giovanni di Lorenzo de' Medici	Son of Lorenzo de' Medici, and student of Angelo Poliziano. Leo X's educator and mentor was Angelo Poliziano. The "gridiron" in the motto evidently refers to Saint Lawrence, who was martyred on a gridiron. This is a rather elliptical allusion to Lorenzo the Magnificent, who was Giovanni's father.	
Leo Florentius.		Adrian. VI.		Florẽtii filius, eius inſignia Leo.	
64.	Florentian lion	Adrian VI (1522–1523)	Adriaan Floriszoon Boeyens	Son of Florentius, his arms were a lion. Adrian VI's coat of arms had two lions on it, and his name is sometimes given as Adrian Florens, or other variants, from his father's first name Florens (Florentius).	
Flos pilei ægri.		Clemens. VII.		Florentinus de domo medicea, eius inſignia pila, & lilia.	
65.	Flower of the sick man's pill	Clement VII (1523–1534)	Giulio di Giuliano de' Medici	A Florentine of the Medicean house, his arms were pill-balls and lilies. The coat of arms of the House of Medici was emblazoned with six medical balls. One of these balls, the largest of the six, was emblazoned with the Florentine lily.	
Hiacinthus medicorũ.		Paulus. III.		Farneſius, qui lilia pro inſignibus geſtat, & Card. fuit SS. Coſme, & Damiani.	
66.	Hyacinth of the physicians	Paul III (1534–1549)	Alessandro Farnese	Farnese, who bore lilies for arms, and was Cardinal of Saints Cosmas and Damian. According to some sources, Paul III's coat of arms were charged with hyacinths, and he was cardinal of Saints Cosmas and Damian, both doctors. The saints were reputedly twin brothers, and are jointly regarded as the patrons of physicians, surgeons, and pharmacists. They are sometimes represented with medical emblems.	
De corona montana.		Iulius. III.		antea uocatus Ioannes Maria de monte.	
67.	From the mountainous crown	Julius III (1550–1555)	Giovanni Maria Ciocchi del Monte	Formerly called Giovanni Maria of the Mountain (de Monte); His coat of arms showed mountains and laurel crowns (chaplets).	
Frumentum flocidum. [sic]		Marcellus. II.		cuius inſignia ceruus & frumẽtum, ideo floccidum, quod pauco tempore uixit in papatu.	
68.	Trifling grain	Marcellus II (1555)	Marcello Cervini degli Spannochi	Whose arms were a stag and grain; 'trifling,' because he lived only a short time as pope. His coat of arms showed a stag and ears of wheat.	
De fide Petri.		Paulus. IIII.		antea uocatus Ioannes Petrus Caraffa.	
69.	From Peter's faith	Paul IV (1555–1559)	Gian Pietro Carafa	Formerly called John Peter Caraffa. Paul IV is said to have used his second Christian name Pietro.	
Eſculapii pharmacum.		Pius. IIII.		antea dictus Io. Angelus Medices.	
70.	Aesculapius' medicine	Pius IV (1559–1565)	Giovanni Angelo Medici	Formerly called Giovanni Angelo Medici. The motto is likely a simple allusion to Pius IV's family name.	
Angelus nemoroſus.		Pius. V.		Michael uocatus, natus in oppido Boſchi.	
71.	Angel of the grove	Pius V (1566–1572)	Antonio Ghislieri	Called Michael, born in the town of Bosco. Pius V was born in Bosco, Piedmont; the placename means grove. His religious name was 'Michele,' and Michele relates to the archangel Michael. O'Brien notes here that many of the prophecies contain plays on Italian words, which are not made explicit in the explanations provided in the Lignum Vitae.	
Medium corpus pilarũ.		Gregorius. XIII.		cuius inſignia medius Draco, Cardinalis creatus à Pio. IIII. qui pila in armis geſtabat.	
72.	Half body of the balls	Gregory XIII (1572–1585)	Ugo Boncompagni	Whose arms were a half-dragon; a cardinal created by Pius IV, who bore balls in his arms. The "balls" in the motto refer to Pope Pius IV, who had made Gregory a cardinal. Pope Gregory had a dragon on his coat of arms with half a body.	
Axis in medietate ſigni.		Sixtus. V.		qui axem in medio Leonis in armis geſtat.	
73.	Axle in the midst of a sign.	Sixtus V (1585–1590)	Felice Peretti di Montalto	Who bears in his arms an axle in the middle of a lion. This is a rather straightforward description of Sixtus V's coat of arms.	
De rore cœli.		Vrbanus. VII.		qui fuit Archiepiſcopus Roſſanenſis in Calabria, ubi mãna colligitur.	
74.	From the dew of the sky	Urban VII (1590)	Giovanni Battista Castagna	Who was Archbishop of Rossano in Calabria, where manna is collected. He had been Archbishop of Rossano in Calabria where sap called "the dew of heaven" is gathered from trees.	

=== Post-publication popes (1590–present) ===
For this group of popes, the published text only provides names for the first three popes, who reigned between the appearance of the text c. 1590, and its publication in 1595. It provides no explanations.

Post-publication popes (1590–present)
Motto no.	Motto (translation)	Regnal name (reign)	Name	Interpretations and criticisms	Coat of arms
Ex antiquitate Vrbis.		Gregorius. XIV.			
75.	Of the antiquity of the city / From the old city	Gregory XIV (1590–1591)	Niccolò Sfondrati	This may have been intended by the author of the prophecies to suggest that Cardinal Girolamo Simoncelli was destined to succeed Urban VII. Simoncelli was from Orvieto, which in Latin is Urbs vetus, old city. Simoncelli was not elected pope, however, Niccolò Sfondrati was, who took the name Gregory XIV. Proponents of the prophecies have attempted to explain it by noting that Gregory XIV's father was a senator of the ancient city of Milan, and the word "senator" is derived from the Latin senex, meaning old man, or that Milan is the "old city" in question, having been founded c. 400 BCE.	
Pia ciuitas in bello.		Innocentius. IX.			
76.	Pious citizens in war	Innocent IX (1591)	Giovanni Antonio Facchinetti	Proponents of the prophecies have suggested different interpretations to relate this motto to Innocent IX, including references to his birthplace of Bologna or title of Patriarch of Jerusalem.	
Crux Romulea.		Clemens. VIII.			
77.	Cross of Romulus	Clement VIII (1592–1605)	Ippolito Aldobrandini	Proponents of the prophecies have suggested different interpretations to relate this motto to Clement VIII, including linking it to the embattled bend on his arms or the war between Catholic Ireland and Protestant England during his papacy.	
Vndoſus uir.					
78.	Wavy man	Leo XI (1605)	Alessandro Ottaviano de' Medici	This may have been intended by the author of the prophecies to suggest to his audience a possible heraldic design, but it does not correspond to Leo XI's Medici arms. Proponents of the prophecies have suggested different interpretations to relate this motto to this pope, including relating it to his short reign "passing like a wave."	
Gens peruerſa.					
79.	Wicked race	Paul V (1605–1621)	Camillo Borghese	Proponents of the prophecies have suggested it is a reference to the dragon and the eagle on Paul V's arms.	
In tribulatione pacis.					
80.	In the trouble of peace	Gregory XV (1621–1623)	Alessandro Ludovisi	The lack of plausible explanations for this motto leads O'Brien to comment, "The prophet, up to 1590, did not deal in generalities".	
Lilium et roſa.					
81.	Lily and rose	Urban VIII (1623–1644)	Maffeo Barberini	This motto again may have been intended to suggest a heraldic device, but not one that matches Urban VIII's arms. Proponents of the prophecies have alternatively suggested that it is a reference to the bees that do occur on his arms, to the fleur-de-lis of his native Florence, or to his dealings in France (the lily) and England (the rose).	
Iucunditas crucis.					
82.	Delight of the cross	Innocent X (1644–1655)	Giovanni Battista Pamphili	Proponents of the prophecies have attempted to link this motto to Innocent X by noting that he was raised to the pontificate around the time of the Feast of the Exaltation of the Cross.	
Montium cuſtos.					
83.	Guard of the mountains	Alexander VII (1655–1667)	Fabio Chigi	Proponents of the prophecies have attempted to link this motto to Alexander VII by noting that his papal arms include six hills, though this was not an uncommon device, and this explanation would not account for the "guard" portion of the motto.	
Sydus olorum.					
84.	Star of the swans	Clement IX (1667–1669)	Giulio Rospigliosi	This again may have been intended to be taken as an allusion to heraldry; O'Brien notes that there is an Italian family with arms featuring a swan with stars, but it had no relation to Clement IX. Proponents of the prophecies have claimed he had a room called the "chamber of swans" during the conclave.	
De flumine magno.					
85.	From a great river	Clement X (1670–1676)	Emilio Bonaventura Altieri	Proponents of the prophecies have attempted to link this motto to Clement X by claiming that the Tiber overflowed its banks at his birth or as an obscure reference to his family name.	
Bellua inſatiabilis.					
86.	Insatiable beast	Innocent XI (1676–1689)	Benedetto Odescalchi	Proponents of the prophecies have attempted to link this motto to the lion on Innocent XI's arms.	
Pœnitentia glorioſa.					
87.	Glorious penitence	Alexander VIII (1689–1691)	Pietro Vito Ottoboni	Proponents of the prophecies have attempted to link this motto to Alexander VIII by interpreting it as a reference to the submission of the Gallican bishops. O'Brien notes, "There are glorious repentances during every pontificate."	
Raſtrum in porta.					
88.	Rake in the door (Note: Rastellus, a diminutive of rastrum, can also refer to a metallic grid used to close the door of a town during night, cataracta in portis urbium according to Du Cange et al, Glossarium mediae et infimae latinitatis, ad vocem.)	Innocent XII (1691–1700)	Antonio Pignatelli	Some sources discussing the prophecy give Innocent XII's family name as "Pignatelli del Rastello," which would provide a clear way for proponents to connect this motto to this pope (rastello or rastrello is Italian for rake). Others, however, give the pope's family name as simply "Pignatelli," and indicate that it is difficult to find a satisfactory explanation to associate the pope with the motto.	
Flores circundati.					
89.	Surrounded flowers	Clement XI (1700–1721)	Giovanni Francesco Albani	A medal of Clement XI was created with the motto "Flores circumdati," drawn from his description in the prophecies, which were widely circulated at that time.	
De bona religione.					
90.	From good religion	Innocent XIII (1721–1724)	Michelangelo dei Conti	Proponents of the prophecies have attempted to link this motto to Innocent XIII by interpreting it as a reference to the fact several popes had come from his family.	
Miles in bello.					
91.	Soldier in war	Benedict XIII (1724–1730)	Pierfrancesco Orsini	Proponents of the prophecies have attempted to link this motto to particular wars that occurred during Benedict XIII's pontificate or a figurative war against decadence in favour of austerity.	
Columna excelſa.					
92.	Lofty column	Clement XII (1730–1740)	Lorenzo Corsini	This may have been intended by the author of the prophecies as a reference to a pope of the Colonna family; a similar motto was used to describe to Martin V, who was pope before the publication of the prophecies. Proponents of the prophecies have attempted to link this motto to Clement XII as an allusion to a statue erected in his memory or the use of two columns from the Pantheon of Agrippa in the chapel he built.	
Animal rurale.					
93.	Country animal	Benedict XIV (1740–1758)	Prospero Lorenzo Lambertini	This may have been intended as a reference to armorial bearings, but it does not match Benedict XIV's arms. Proponents of the prophecies have attempted to link this motto to this pope as a description of his "plodding ox" diligence.	
Roſa Vmbriæ.					
94.	Rose of Umbria	Clement XIII (1758–1769)	Carlo della Torre di Rezzonico	Proponents of the prophecies have attempted to link this motto to Clement XIII as a reference to his elevation to sainthood of several Franciscans, to which order the motto can refer.	
Vrſus uelox.					
95.	Swift bear (later misprinted as Cursus velox Swift Course or Visus velox Swift Glance)	Clement XIV (1769–1774)	Giovanni Vincenzo Antonio Ganganelli	Proponents of the prophecies have struggled to provide a satisfactory explanation of this motto; some authors claim without evidence that the Ganganelli arms featured a running bear, but this is dubious.	
Peregrin^{9} apoſtolic^{9}. (Note: The symbol like a raised 9 is a scribal abbreviation for the Latin suffix us.)					
96.	Apostolic pilgrim	Pius VI (1775–1799)	Giovanni Angelo Onofrio Melchiorre Natale Antonio Braschi	Proponents of the prophecies have attempted to link this motto to Pius VI by suggesting it as a reference to his long reign.	
Aquila rapax.					
97.	Rapacious eagle	Pius VII (1800–1823)	Barnaba Niccolò Maria Luigi Chiaramonti	Proponents of the prophecies have attempted to link this motto to Pius VII by suggesting it as a reference to the eagle on the arms of Napoleon, whose reign as Emperor of the French took place during Pius's pontificate.	
Canis & coluber.					
98.	Dog and adder	Leo XII (1823–1829)	Annibale Francesco Clemente Melchiorre Girolamo Nicola della Genga	Proponents of the prophecies have attempted to link this motto to Leo XII by suggesting the dog and snake are allusions to his qualities of vigilance and prudence, respectively.	
Vir religioſus.					
99.	Religious man	Pius VIII (1829–1830)	Francesco Saverio Maria Felice Castiglioni	Proponents of the prophecies have attempted to link this motto to Pius VIII by suggesting it as a reference to his papal name or the fact that he was not the first pope from his family.	
De balneis Ethruriæ.					
100.	From the baths of Etruria	Gregory XVI (1831–1846)	Bartolomeo Alberto Cappellari	Proponents of the prophecies have attempted to link this motto to Gregory XVI by suggesting it as a reference to his membership in the Camaldolese Order, which was founded in the thirteenth century in a locality called Balneum (Bath) in Latin, in Etruria (Tuscany).	
Crux de cruce.					
101.	Cross from cross	Pius IX (1846–1878)	Giovanni Maria Battista Pietro Pellegrino Isidoro Mastai-Ferretti	Proponents of the prophecies have attempted to link this motto to Pius IX by interpreting it as a reference to his difficulties ("crosses") with the House of Savoy, whose emblem is a cross. O'Brien notes, "A forger would be very disposed to chance some reference to a cross on account of its necessary connection with all popes as well as the probability of its figuring, in some form or other, on the pope's arms."	
Lumen in cœlo.					
102.	Light in the sky	Leo XIII (1878–1903)	Gioacchino Vincenzo Raffaele Luigi Pecci	Proponents of the prophecies have attempted to link this motto to Leo XIII by interpreting it as a reference to the star on his arms. O'Brien notes this coincidence would be much more remarkable if the prophecies had referred to sydus (star), as they did when describing this same device on pre-publication Pope Innocent VII's arms.	
Ignis ardens.					
103.	Burning fire	Pius X (1903–1914)	Giuseppe Melchiorre Sarto	Proponents of the prophecies have attempted to link this motto to Pius X by interpreting it as a reference to his zeal.	
Religio depopulata.					
104.	Religion destroyed	Benedict XV (1914–1922)	Giacomo Paolo Giovanni Batista della Chiesa	Proponents of the prophecies have attempted to link this motto to Benedict XV by interpreting it as a reference to World War I and the Russian Revolution, which occurred during his pontificate.	
Fides intrepida.					
105.	Intrepid faith	Pius XI (1922–1939)	Ambrogio Damiano Achille Ratti	Proponents of the prophecies have attempted to link this motto to Pius XI by interpreting it as a reference to his faith and actions during his pontificate: in 1937, the Pope strongly condemned Nazism and Communism (Encyclicals: Mit brennender Sorge, Divini Redemptoris). The end of his pontificate was dominated by speaking out against Hitler and Mussolini and defending the Catholic Church from intrusions into Catholic life and education.	
Paſtor angelicus.					
106.	Angelic shepherd	Pius XII (1939–1958)	Eugenio Maria Giuseppe Giovanni Pacelli	Proponents of the prophecies have attempted to link this motto to Pius XII by interpreting it as a reference to his role during the Holocaust.	
Paſtor & nauta.					
107.	Shepherd and sailor	John XXIII (1958–1963)	Angelo Giuseppe Roncalli	Proponents of the prophecies have attempted to link the "sailor" portion of this motto to John XXIII by interpreting it as a reference to his title Patriarch of Venice, a maritime city.	
Flos florum.					
108.	Flower of flowers	Paul VI (1963–1978)	Giovanni Battista Enrico Antonio Maria Montini	Proponents of the prophecies have attempted to link this motto to Paul VI by interpreting it as a reference to the fleurs-de-lis on his arms.	
De medietate lunæ.					
109.	Of the half moon	John Paul I (1978)	Albino Luciani	Proponents of the prophecies have attempted to link this motto to John Paul I by referring to the light of the moon and interpreting his birth name as meaning "from the white light."	
De labore solis.					
110.	From the labour of the sun / Of the eclipse of the sun	John Paul II (1978–2005)	Karol Józef Wojtyła	Proponents of the prophecies find significance in the occurrence of solar eclipses (elsewhere in the world) on the dates of John Paul II's birth (18 May 1920) and funeral (8 April 2005). Other attempts to link the pope to the motto have been "more forced," included drawing a connection to Copernicus (who formulated a comprehensive heliocentric model of the Solar System), as both were Polish and lived in Kraków for parts of their lives.	
Gloria oliuæ.					
111.	Glory of the olive	Benedict XVI (Pope, 2005–2013; Pope emeritus, 2013–2022)	Joseph Alois Ratzinger	Proponents of the prophecies generally try to draw a connection between Benedict and the Olivetan order to explain this motto: Benedict's choice of papal name is after Saint Benedict of Nursia, founder of the Benedictine Order, of which the Olivetans are one branch. Other explanations make reference to him as being a pope dedicated to peace and reconciliations of which the olive branch is the symbol.	
In pſecutione. extrema S.R.E. ſedebit.
	In the final persecution of the Holy Roman Church, there will sit.	In the Lignum Vitae, "In persecutione. extrema S.R.E. sedebit." is on its own line and followed by a full stop. While generally read as part of the "Peter the Roman" prophecy, other interpreters view it as a separate, incomplete sentence explicitly referring to additional popes between "glory of the olive" and "Peter the Roman".			
Petrus Romanus, qui paſcet oues in multis tribulationibus: quibus tranſactis ciuitas ſepticollis diruetur, & Iudex tremẽdus iudicabit populum ſuum. (Note: In several later printings of the prophecies, the word ſuum was dropped, leading to the translation "the people" instead of "his people". See, e.g., O'Brien (1880), p. 83.) Finis.
112.	Peter the Roman, who will pasture his sheep in many tribulations, and when these things are finished, the city of seven hills [i.e. Rome] will be destroyed, and the dreadful judge will judge his people. The End.	Many analyses of the prophecy note that it is open to the interpretation that additional popes would come between the "glory of the olive" and Peter the Roman. Popular speculation by proponents of the prophecy attach this prediction to Benedict XVI's successor. After Francis's election as pope, proponents in internet forums tried to link him to the prophecy. Theories include a connection with his namesake Francis of Assisi, whose father was named Pietro (Peter), and that he was of Italian descent.			

== In fiction ==
The Prophecy of the Popes is referred to in several works of fiction, including several works of apocalyptic fiction. Steve Berry's novel The Third Secret (2005) features the fictional Pope Peter II (originally Cardinal Valendrea), who is elected Pope after the death of the fictional Pope Clement XV.

In James Rollins' sixth Sigma Force novel, The Doomsday Key (2009), Saint Malachy's "Doomsday Prophecy" and the conflicts between Christians and pagans are important plot points.

== See also ==
- Bartholomew Holzhauser
- Legends surrounding the papacy
- List of popes
- Nostradamus
- The Prophesying Nun of Dresden
- Three Secrets of Fátima
- Vaticinia de Summis Pontificibus
- Vaticinia Nostradami
