= Arnold Wyon =

French monk (1554–1610)

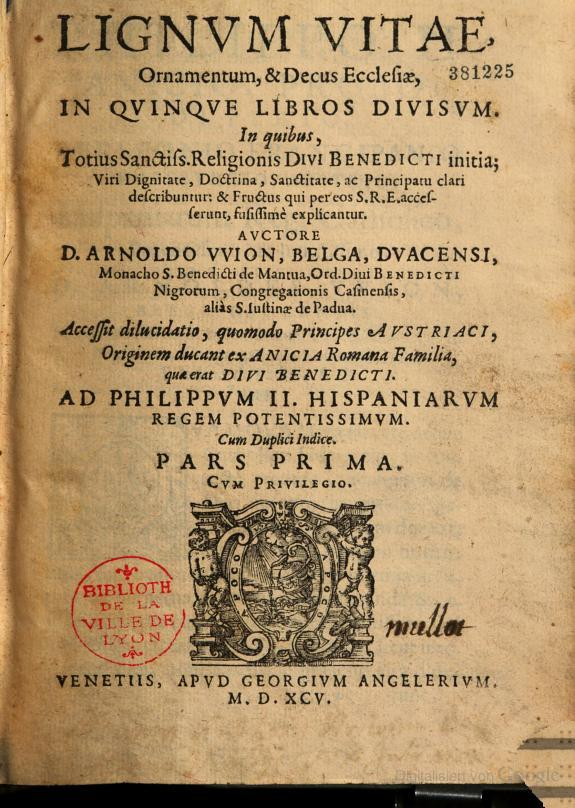
Lignum Vitae - 1595

Arnold Wyon, also known as Arnold de Wion, was a Benedictine monk and historian born in Douai (at the time in the Spanish Netherlands) 15 May 1554, and died near Mantua, Italy around 1610.

== Life ==
Wyon was the son of Amé Wion, a tax attorney of Douai and studied in his hometown, before joining the Benedictine Abbey Saint-Pierre of Oudenburg near Bruges. In the religious wars that took place in the Netherlands, he was forced to take refuge in the Abbey at Marchiennes in 1578.

On March 14, 1579, he was ordained in the Cathedral of Arras and moved to the Polirone Abbey, near Mantua (modern town of San Benedetto Po).

== List of works ==
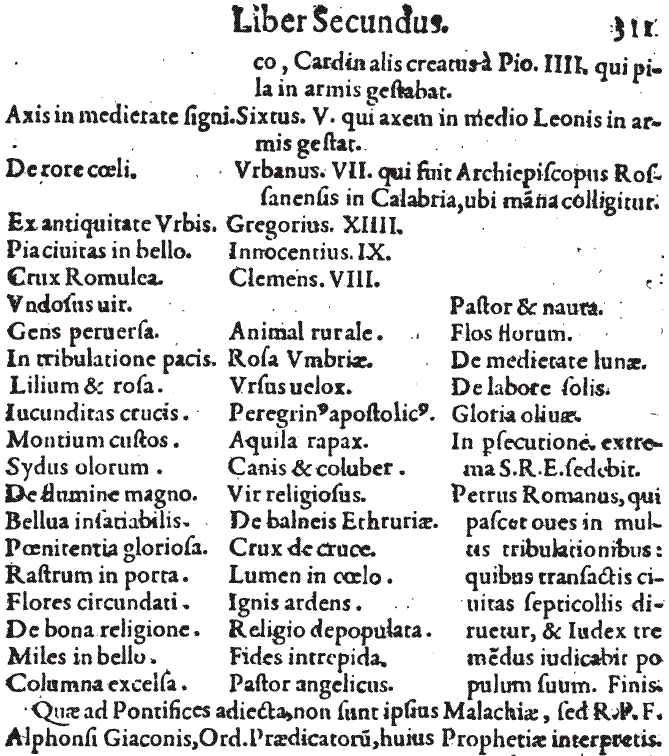
Lignum Vitae - 1595

- Lignum Vitae, a large book on the history of the order of St. Benedict, which he began it in Flanders and completed it in Mantua. In 1592, a general chapter authorized him to dedicate it to King Philippe II.
- He is alleged to have rediscovered the Prophetia S. Malachiae, Archiepiscopi, Summis Pontificibus, the alleged prophecies of the Bishop Malachy of Armagh, who died at the Abbey of Clairvaux.
- Vita S. Gerardi, e Veneta familia of Sagredo, martyris and Hungarorum apostoli notationibus illustrata, Venice, 1597 (it is a life of Bishop Gerard of Csanád).
- Chronologia Septuaginta Interpretum, cum Vulgatæ editionis Bibliorum Latinae Chronographia conciliata; adjunctum is Chronicon ab orbe condito usque ad haec tempora (not printed; attempt to bridge the differences between the Septuagint and the Vulgate, then universal Chronicle).
- The complete works of Bartolomeo Sacchi ("Platinum"), which was not published.

== Controversy ==
Wyon is best known for reportedly discovering the Prophecy of the Popes or Prophecy of Saint Malachy. Critics cite a lack of accuracy for popes after Wyon "discovered" the document, and the similarity between the 75th pope and Cardinal Simoncelli, a friend of Wyon's, who was seeking election in the then upcoming papal conclave.
