= Vaticinia Nostradami =

Apocalyptic writing by Nostradamus

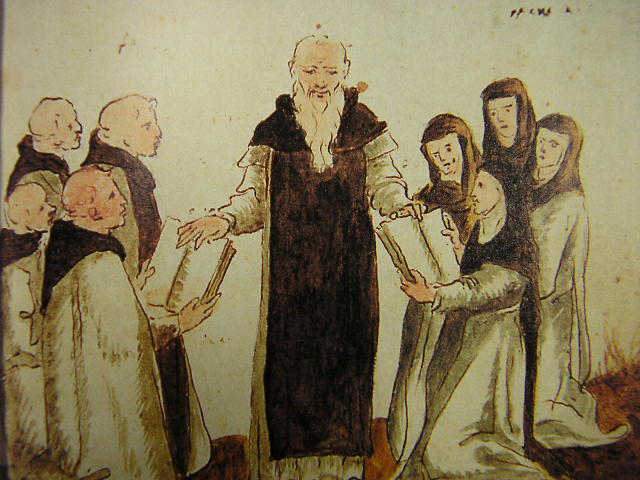
Image 3

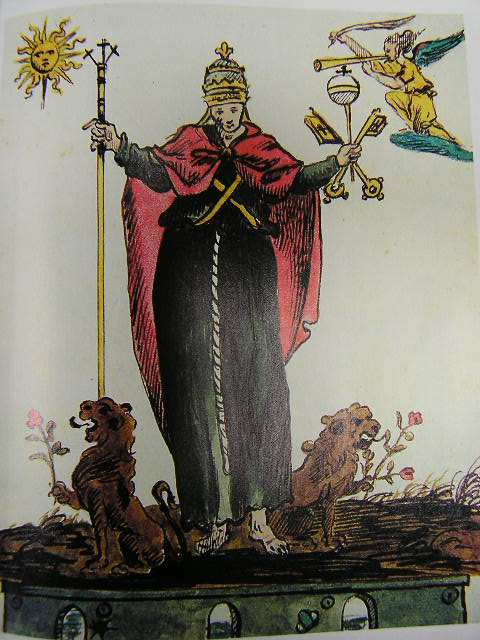
Image 27

The Vaticinia Michaelis Nostradami de Futuri Christi Vicarii ad Cesarem Filium D. I. A. Interprete (The Prophecies of Michel Nostradamus on The Future Vicars of Christ to Cesar His Son, As Expounded by Lord Abbot Joachim), or Vaticinia Nostradami (The Prophecies of Nostradamus) for short, is a collection of eighty watercolor images compiled as an illustrated codex. A version of the well-known Vaticinia de Summis Pontificibus of the 13th–14th century, it was discovered in 1994 by the Italian journalists Enza Massa and Roberto Pinotti in the Biblioteca Nazionale Centrale di Roma (Central National Library) in Rome, Italy. The document can be found in the library under the title Fondo Vittorio Emanuele 307.

== Alleged Nostradamian connections ==
A postscript by Carthusian librarians states that the book had been presented by one Brother Beroaldus to cardinal Maffeo Barberini, who would later become Pope Urban VIII (1623–1644). A further covering note suggests that the images were by the French seer Nostradamus (1503–1566), and had been sent to Rome by his son César de Nostredame as a gift. There is, however, absolutely no contemporary evidence that Nostradamus himself was either a painter or the author of the work, whose contents in fact date from several centuries before his time—nor, indeed, that he had ever heard of it, given that it did not finally appear in print until after his death. The postscript is in fact dated '1629', and the covering note (not in Nostradamus's hand) from which the Nostradamian title derives cannot, on the basis of its contents, date from earlier than 1689 – though an internal note does refer to a source dated 1343.

Nevertheless, the highly speculative Italian writer Ottavio Cesare Ramotti, together with the History Channel's The Lost Book of Nostradamus (October 2007), have still made much of the book's supposedly 'Nostradamian' origin.

There is a letter by Cèsar de Nostredame (Michel's first son), written to the French scientist Fabri de Peiresc, in which mention is made of several miniatures painted by Cèsar, and of a booklet that was destined as a gift to King Louis XIII in 1629, but there is no evidence whatsoever of any connection between these and the Vaticinia.

== Style ==
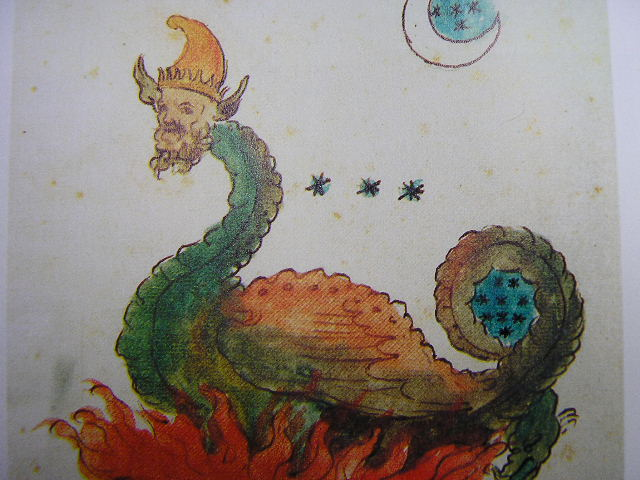
Image 18

The images contain symbolic objects, letters, animals, crossings of banners, bugles, crosses, candles, three writing styles, etc., some of which seem to some to form figures similar to Roman numerals, or veiled references to personal names. As suggested by the various added inscriptions, they are supposed to have been inspired by the celebrated papal prophecies of Abbot Joachim of Fiore, a 12th-century Cistercian monk from Calabria.

== Sources ==
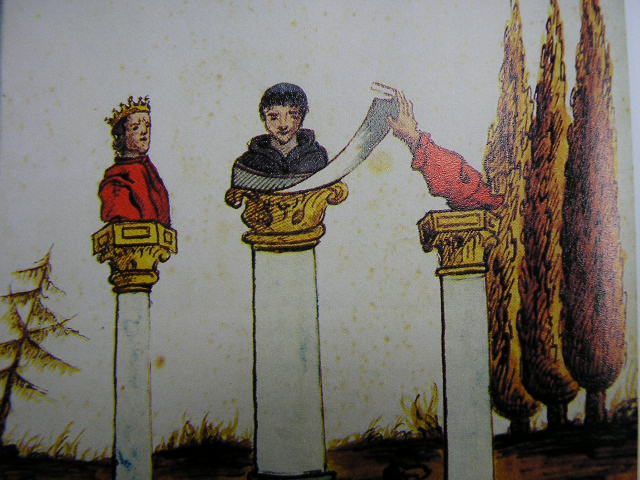
Image 23

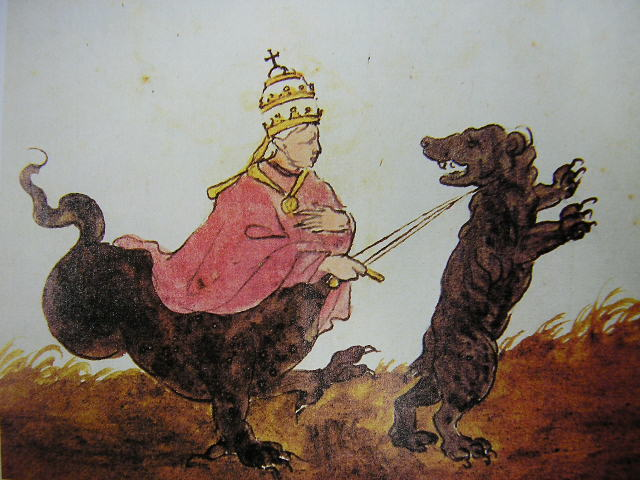
Image 38

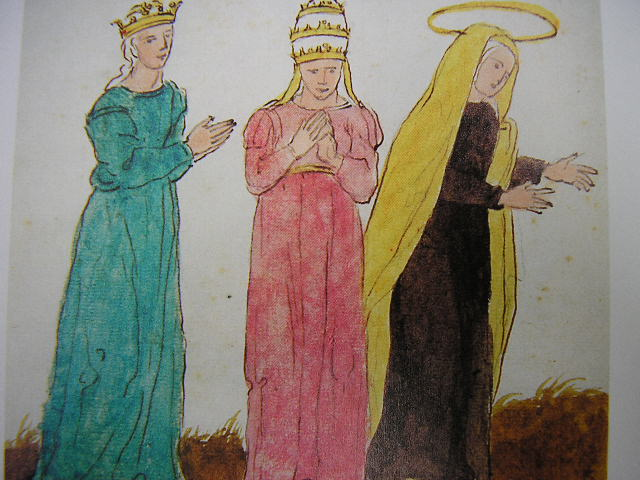
Image 44

The origin of the work is clearly the fourteenth century Vaticinia de Summis Pontificibus, in which most of the images (including Image 23 opposite) are to be found. By way of example, its Image 12 corresponds to the latter's Image 9, Image 18 to 15, Image 23 to 20, Image 24 to 21 and Image 29 to 26 (note, too, the similarity of sequence). A work similar to this is Marston MS 225, which can be found in the manuscript and rare-book library of Yale University, in New Haven, Connecticut, United States. This manuscript comes from the German areas of Bavaria and Bohemia, probably from within the courts of emperor Frederick III and Maximilian I.

== Complete Interpretation of the Codex ==
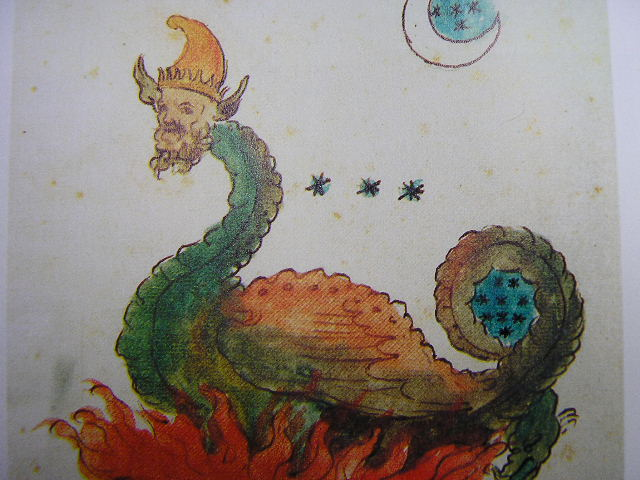
Image 18

In 2025, researcher and college graduate Emiliano Conte published the book The Lost Book of Nostradamus: The Church and the Dragon, in which he presents a comprehensive interpretation of the eighty watercolors that make up the manuscript known as *Vaticinia Nostradami*. According to the author, the work offers a sequential and unified reading of all the illustrations, linking them to historical events, religious symbolism, and prophecies attributed to Nostradamus. The publication is one of the first studies specifically dedicated to proposing a complete interpretation of the codex’s collection of watercolors. Subsequently, a documentary featuring part of the research was posted online.

== See also ==
- Joachim da Fiore
- Michel Nostradamus, the famous 16th-century French seer
- Prophecy
- Prophecy of the Popes, attributed to Saint Malachy, Archbishop of Armagh
- Tu Bei Tu, a similar book of prophecies from China.
- Vaticinia de Summis Pontificibus
