= Vaticinia de Summis Pontificibus =

Medieval prophecies on the Papacy

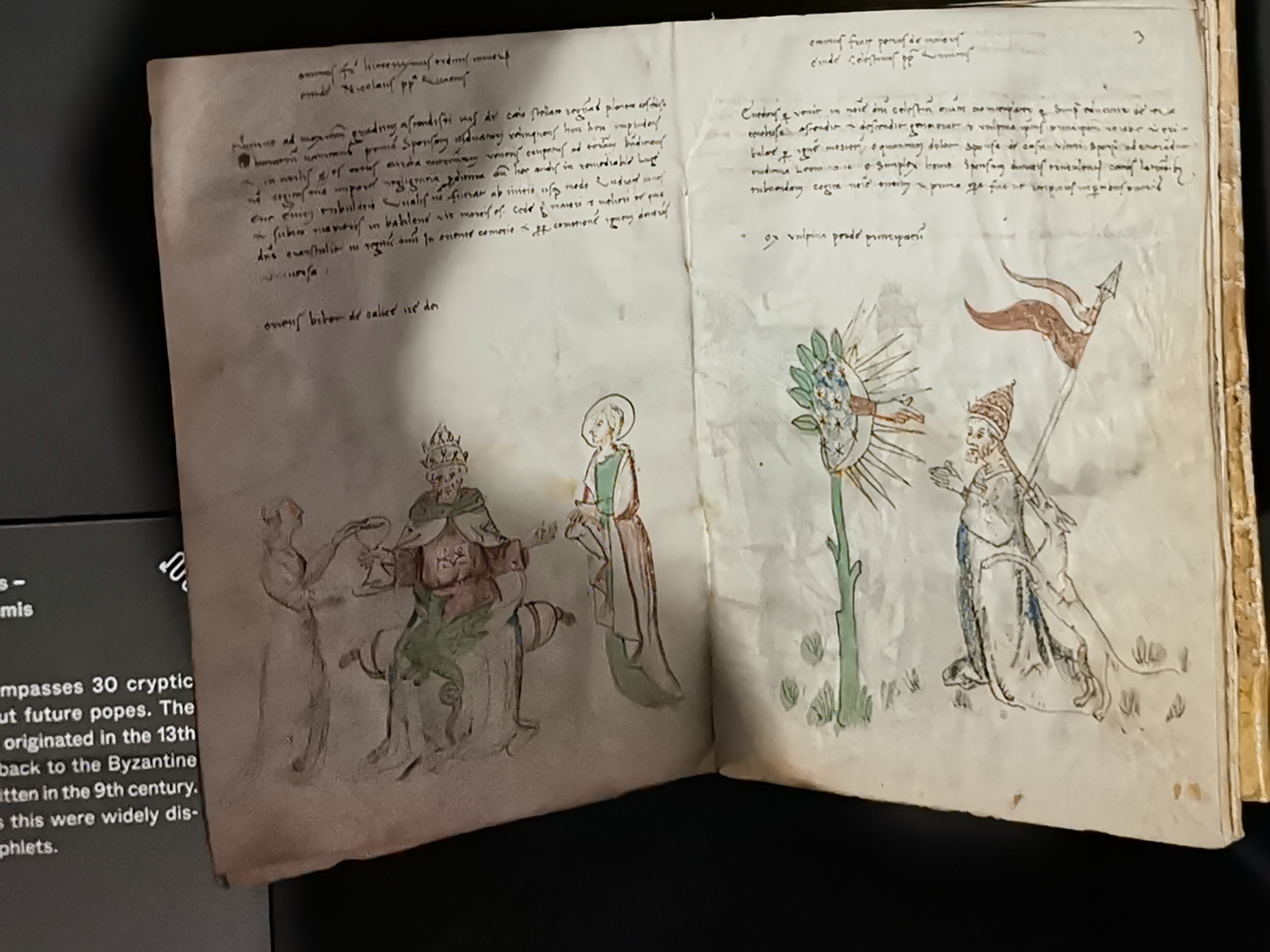
15th-century watercolor illustration in Vaticinia de Summis Pontificibus

A series of manuscript prophecies concerning the Papacy, under the title of Vaticinia de Summis Pontificibus, a Latin text which assembles portraits of popes and prophecies related to them, circulated from the late thirteenth/early fourteenth century, with prophecies concerning popes from Pope Nicholas III onwards.

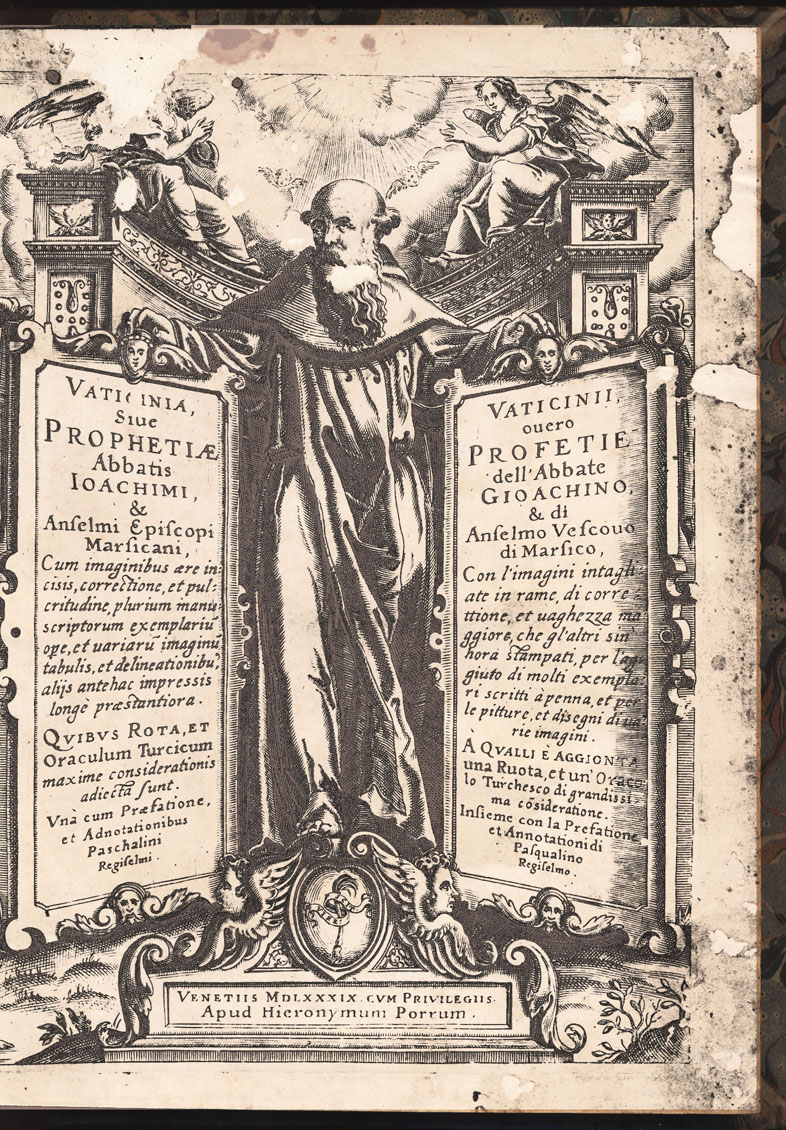
Title page of Vaticinia, sive Prophetiae / Vaticinii, overo Profetie (Prophecies or Foretellings). Venice: Hieronymum Porrum and Giovanni Battista Bertoni, 1589.

== Introduction ==
The series of some thirty prophecies, based on Greek prototypes, was "most probably conceived in order to influence one of the ongoing papal elections," written in opposition to the Orsini and their candidates.

The mystical series of prophecies, known from their incipit as the Genus nequam prophecies ("the origin of evil"), are derived from the Byzantine Leo Oracles, a series of twelfth-century Byzantine prophecies that foretell a savior-emperor destined to restore unity to the Christian Empire. Their poems and tempera illuminations mix fantasy, the occult, and chronicle in a chronology of the popes. Each prophecy consists of four elements, an enigmatic allegorical text, an emblematic picture, a motto, and an attribution to a pope.

The series was augmented in the fourteenth century with further prophecies, with the incipit Ascende calve ("arise, bald one"), written in imitative continuation of the earlier set, but with more overtly propagandist aims. By the time of the Council of Constance (1414–18), both series were united as the Vaticinia de summis pontificibus and misattributed to the Calabrian mystic Joachim of Flora, thus credited to a pseudo-Joachim. There are some fifty manuscripts of this fuller collection.

The prophecies received numerous printed editions.

== See also ==
- Prophecy of the Popes
- Vaticinia Nostradami
