= Bishop of Lismore, Ireland =

Roman Catholic episcopal title

The Bishop of Lismore was a separate episcopal title which took its name after the town of Lismore in County Waterford, Ireland.

== History ==
The diocese of Lismore was one of the twenty-four dioceses established by the Synod of Rathbreasail in 1111. The see of Ardmore was incorporated with Lismore in the late 12th century. In 1363, Lismore and Waterford were united by Pope Urban V, and Thomas le Reve became the first bishop of the united see of Waterford and Lismore.

== List of bishops of Lismore ==
Bishops of Lismore
| From | Until | Incumbent | Notes |
|---|---|---|---|
| unknown | 1113 | Niall mac Meic Áedacáin | Died in office |
| unknown | 1119 | Ua Daighthig | Died in office |
| unknown | 1135 | Máel Ísu Ua hAinmere, O.S.B. | Probably was bishop of Lismore and Waterford during the last years of his life; died in office; also known as Malchus |
| 1135 | c.1151 | Máel Muire Ua Loingsig | Probably resigned circa 1151; his death is recorded in the Annals of Ulster in 1159 |
| 1151 | c.1179 | Gilla Críst Ua Connairche, O.Cist. | Consecrated in 1151; resigned circa 1179; died 1186; first Abbot of Mellifont; he is said to have been the first papal legate in Ireland; also known as Christianus |
| c.1179 | 1202 | Felix | Elected circa 1179; attended the Third Council of the Lateran in 1179; resigned 1202 |
| 1203 | bef.1216 | Malachias, O.Cist. | Elected circa 1202 and consecrated before 5 November 1203; died before 1216 |
| 1216 | 1218 | Thomas | Elected and consecrated before June 1216; died before December 1218 |
| 1218 | 1223 | Robert of Bedford | Formerly Bishop-elect of Glendalough; elected Bishop of Lismore before 13 December 1218 and received possession of the temporalities on that date; consecrated before 17 April 1219; died before November 1223 |
| 1228 | 1246 | Griffin Christopher | Elected before 6 November 1223 and received possession of the temporalities on that date; received the temporalities again from the king on 8 July 1225 and again 11 July 1227; consecrated before 25 April 1228; resigned sometime between 17 July and 8 August 1246; died after 22 August 1252 |
| 1246/48 | 1253 | Ailinn Ó Súilleabáin, O.P. | Translated from Cloyne after 26 October 1246, but did receive possession of the see's temporalities until 25 May 1248; died before 27 April 1253; also known as Alan O'Sullivan |
| 1253 | 1270 | Thomas | Elected before 25 July 1253; received possession of the temporalities after 27 July 1253; consecrated after 15 October 1253; died before 2 July 1270 |
| 1270 | 1279 | John Roche | Elected before 20 August 1270 and received possession of the temporalities after that date; died 11 June 1279; also known as John de Rupe |
| 1280 | 1308 | Richard Corre | Elected 19 July and consecrated after 24 October 1279; received possession of the temporalities 11 November 1279; died in October 1308 |
| 1309 | 1321 | William Fleming | Elected after 24 November 1308; died in November 1321; also known as William le Fleming |
| 1321 | 1354 | John Leynagh | Elected after 13 December 1321 and consecrated 17 April 1323; died in December 1354; also known as John Launaught |
| 1354 | 1358 | See vacant | During this vacancy, King Edward III ordered the temporalities of Lismore to be delivered to Roger Cradock, Bishop of Waterford, however, this was not done. |
| 1358 | 1363 | Thomas le Reve | Appointed 18 May 1358 and received possession of the temporalities 24 August 1358; became Bishop of Waterford and Lismore on 16 June 1363 when Pope Urban V united the two dioceses |
In 1363, Lismore united with Waterford to form the united bishopric of Waterford and Lismore

== See also ==
- Lismore Cathedral, Ireland
