= Thomas Groome =

Irish author and professor (born 1945)

- Born: 1945 (age 80–81); Dublin
- Citizenship: Republic of Ireland

Academic background
- Education: Fordham University; Columbia University

Thomas H. Groome is an author and a professor in theology and religious education at Boston College. Groome has been critical of the Catholic Church's stance on clerical celibacy.

== Biography ==
Professor Groome has a doctoral degree from Union Theological Seminary, Columbia University. He has taught at seminaries in several countries. Books have been published about his teaching in several languages. In 1998–99, Groome was president of the Association of Professors and Researchers in Religious Education (APRRE). As of 2014, he is a professor of theology and religious education at Boston College. He chairs the school's Department of Religious Education and Pastoral Ministry.

In 2012, Groome said that the struggling Roman Catholic Archdiocese of Boston had made progress by keeping parishes from closing and by reconnecting with lapsed Catholics. He cautioned that the archdiocese would be affected by a coming shortage of priests and said that the church would eventually have to make the decision to allow married men in the priesthood.

Writing a piece for The Boston Globe in 2002, Groome advocated for the inclusion of women in the Catholic priesthood. "What a loss it is when ordained ministry is limited to men, excluding the consciousness and gifts of women; at best we benefit from only half our priestly resources," he wrote. In the same article, he wrote that the priestly requirement of celibacy may have inadvertently attracted a number of gay men to the priesthood. He said that when young men are taught that those with a homosexual orientation must remain chaste, some of those men may choose the celibate lifestyle of a priest.

== Writing ==
Groome has written several books, including Christian Religious Education. In that work, he developed the concept of shared Christian praxis, which Neville Clement called "groundbreaking in bringing insights from contemporary educational disciplines, philosophy, and theology to bear on Christian religious education."

He also wrote What Makes Us Catholic (2002). Reviewing that book for Catholic Education: A Journal of Inquiry and Practice, Donna Frazier wrote that Groome was "engaging and personal" but that "readers who have left the Church might not recognize Groome's positive vision of the Church as the same institution that hurt or disappointed them." Publishers Weekly wrote, "Groome's reputation as an author of several Catholic school texts could make his latest book a popular resource for adult educational programs, since each chapter includes questions suitable for group discussion. However, despite the author's claim that he writes for Catholics "who span the spectrum," his views may alienate more conservative members."
