= Bishop of Cashel and Ossory =

The Bishop of Cashel and Ossory (Full title: Bishop of Cashel, Waterford and Lismore with Ossory, Ferns and Leighlin) is the Ordinary of the United Diocese of Cashel, Waterford and Lismore with Ossory, Ferns and Leighlin in the Church of Ireland. The diocese is in the ecclesiastical province of Dublin.

== Overview and history ==
In 1833, the two provinces of Dublin and Cashel were merged. Over the centuries, numerous dioceses were merged, in view of declining membership. The same is true for this diocese where it can be seen that each of the entities listed in the title would have been a diocese in its own right.

It is for this reason that the united diocese has six cathedrals (although the union of Waterford and Lismore predates the Reformation).

== Cathedrals of the united diocese ==
- St. John's Cathedral, Cashel.
- Christ Church Cathedral, Waterford.
- St Carthage's Cathedral, Lismore.
- St. Canice's Cathedral, Kilkenny (Ossory).
- St Edan's Cathedral, Ferns.
- St Laserian's Cathedral, Old Leighlin.

== List of bishops ==
Bishops of Cashel and Ossory
From	Until	Ordinary	Notes
1977	1980	John Armstrong	Bishop of Cashel and Waterford until 1977; translated to Armagh on 25 February 1980.
1980	1997	Noel Willoughby	Retired.
1997	2002	John Neill	Translated from Tuam, Killala and Achonry. Translated to Dublin and Glendalough.
2002	2006	Peter Barrett	Resigned.
2006	2022	Michael Burrows	Previously Dean of Cork. Became first Bishop of Tuam, Limerick and Killaloe
2022		Adrian Wilkinson	Previously Archdeacon of Cork, Cloyne and Ross

== See also ==
- List of Anglican diocesan bishops in Britain and Ireland
- List of Anglican dioceses in the United Kingdom and Ireland
- Synod of Cashel
