= Thomas Smyth (Archdeacon of Lismore) =

Thomas Smith, LL.D. was an Irish Anglican priest.

The grandson of Thomas Smyth, Bishop of Limerick, and son of George Smyth, Baron of the Court of Exchequer (Ireland), he was educated at Trinity College, Dublin. He was appointed Archdeacon of Lismore in 1788, serving until 1810 when he exchanged it for the Prebendary of Kilrossanty in Lismore Cathedral. He was also 3rd prebendary at Christ Church Cathedral, Dublin from 1803 to 1826.

He had one daughter, Catherine. She married in 1807 Joshua Kemmis of Knightstown, County Laois, High Sheriff of Queen's County in 1795, and had three children. Joshua died in 1818; Catherine, who was much younger, outlived him by forty years.

== Notes ==
Church of Ireland titles
Preceded by Alexander Alcock	Archdeacon of Lismore; 1788–1810	Succeeded by Philip Ryan
