= Leighlin =

Leighlin may refer to:

- Old Leighlin, medieval town in County Carlow, Ireland
- Leighlinbridge, nearby modern town
- Old Leighlin (Parliament of Ireland constituency), abolished 1800
- Bishop of Leighlin, former Christian diocese in Ireland
- Baron Brereton of Leighlin, title in the Peerage of Ireland 1624–1722
