= Samuel Ridgeway =

Desmond Hilton Patton was the Archdeacon of Ossory and Leighlin from 1940 until 1951.

Ridgeway was educated at Trinity College, Dublin and ordained in 1901. He began his career with curacies in Leicester and New Ross. He held Incumbencies in Gorey and Carlow. He was Chancellor of St Laserian's Cathedral, Old Leighlin from 1933 to 1940.
