= Peter Lewis =

Peter or Pete Lewis may refer to:

== Arts and entertainment ==
- Pete "Guitar" Lewis (1913–1970), American R&B guitarist with Johnny Otis
- Peter Lewis (musician) (born 1945), American musician, founding member of Moby Grape
- Peter Scott Lewis (born 1953), American composer
- Peter Lewis (announcer), British television continuity announcer
- Peter Wayne Lewis, Jamaican-American painter

== Law and politics ==
- Peter Edwin Lewis (1912–1976), British judge and politician
- Peter Lewis (politician) (1942–2017), Australian politician
- Peter Lewis (prosecutor), British prosecutor

== Sports ==
- Peter Lewis (rugby league) (born 1979), New Zealand rugby league player
- Peter Lewis (cyclist) (born 1990), Australian cyclist
- Peter Lewis (dog trainer), British dog sport and agility trainer

== Others ==
- Peter Lewis (priest) (fl. 1559–1572), Irish dean of Lismore and a precentor of Christ Church Cathedral, Dublin
- Peter Lewis (British Army officer) (1918–2008), British soldier, journalist and author
- Peter B. Lewis (1933–2013), American businessman
- Peter J. Lewis, American philosopher

== See also ==
- Jon Peter Lewis (born 1979), American singer and songwriter
- Lewis (surname)
