= Francisco de Ribera =

Spanish Franciscan bishop

Francisco de Ribera OFM
- Diocese: Leighlin
- See: St Laserian's Cathedral (held by Church of Ireland)
- Appointed: 14 September 1587
- Predecessor: Thomas O'Fihelly
- Successor: Luke Archer
- Opposed to: Richard Meredith

Personal details
- Died: 10 September 1604 Antwerp, Duchy of Brabant, Habsburg Netherlands
- Residence: Irish College, Antwerp

Francisco de Ribera was a Spanish Franciscan priest from Toledo, a Doctor of Theology, whom Pope Sixtus V appointed as bishop of Leighlin, Ireland, on 14 September 1587. Leighlin being under English control at this time, Ribera resided in the Irish College in Antwerp, where he built an infirmary. He died in Antwerp on 10 September 1604.
