= William Dennis (priest) =

Anglican priest (died 1749)

William Dennis was Anglican priest in Ireland in the 18th century.

Dennis was educated at Trinity College Dublin. A Prebendary of Kilrossanty in Lismore Cathedral, Ireland, he was appointed Archdeacon of Lismore in 1723. He died in June 1749 and is buried in the grounds of Waterford Cathedral.
