= William Greene (dean of Lismore) =

William George Greene was Dean of Lismore from 1919 until 1930.

He was educated at Trinity College Dublin and ordained in 1904. He began his ecclesiastical career with a curacy at Fiddown. He was Rector of Kilmeadan then Rural Dean of Waterford.

Religious titles
Preceded by George Samuel Mayers	Dean of Lismore; 1919–1930	Succeeded by John Herbert Leslie
