= John Eeles =

Anglican priest (1658–1722)

John Eeles (1658–1722) was an Anglican priest in Ireland in the late 17th and early 18th centuries.

Eeles was born in Berkshire and educated at Trinity College, Dublin. A Prebendary of Tullaghorton in Lismore Cathedral, Ireland, he was appointed Archdeacon of Lismore in 1686. He was Chancellor of Waterford from 1691 to 1699; and Dean of Waterford from until his death in 1722.
