= Arthur Stanhope (priest) =

Anglican priest

Arthur Stanhope was an Anglican priest in Ireland in the 17th century.

Stanhope was educated at Trinity College, Dublin. He was a prebendary of Waterford Cathedral from 1663 to 1678; and Dean of Waterford from 1678 to 1684: he was also Vicar general of the Diocese. He was also Archdeacon of Lismore from 1663 to 1684.
