= Diocese of Cashel and Ossory =

Anglican diocese of the Church of Ireland

United Dioceses of Cashel, Waterford and Lismore with Ossory, Ferns and Leighlin Dioecesis Casheliensis, Vaterfordiensis et Lismoriensis cum Ossoriensis, Fernensis et Leighlinensis Deoise Chaisil, Phort Láirge, Leasa Móire, Osraí, Fhearna agus Leithghlinne
- Coat of arms

Location
- Country: Ireland
- Ecclesiastical province: Dublin and Cashel

Information
- Denomination: Anglican
- Cathedral: St. John's Cathedral, Cashel, Christ Church Cathedral, Waterford, St Carthage's Cathedral, Lismore, St Canice's Cathedral, Ferns Cathedral, St Laserian's Cathedral, Old Leighlin

Current leadership
- Bishop: The Right Reverend Adrian Wilkinson
- Archdeacons: Archdeacon of Ossory and Leighlin: The Ven Mark J. J. Hayden Archdeacon of Ferns, Cashel, Waterford and Lismore: The Ven R.J. Gray

Website
- cashel.anglican.org

The United Dioceses of Cashel and Ossory (Full title: the United Dioceses of Cashel, Waterford and Lismore with Ossory, Ferns and Leighlin, Irish: Deoise Chaisil, Phort Láirge, Leasa Móire, Osraí, Fhearna agus Leithghlinne) is a diocese of the Church of Ireland in the south-eastern part of Ireland that was formed from a merger of older dioceses in 1977. The diocese is in the ecclesiastical province of Dublin.

== Overview and history ==
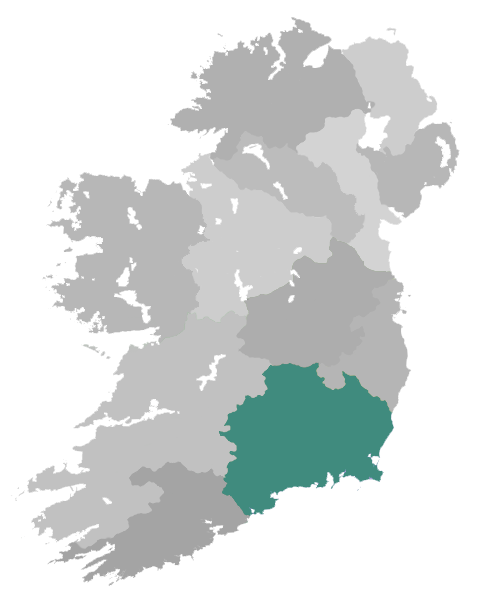
Diocese Highlighted

When the Church in England broke communion with the Catholic Church, the Church of England was established by the state as the established church. Later, by decree of the Irish Parliament, a similar new body became the state church in the Kingdom of Ireland. It assumed possession of most Church property (and so retained a great repository of religious architecture and other items, though some were later destroyed). The substantial majority of the population remained faithful to the Catholic Church, despite the political and economic advantages of membership in the state church. They were obliged to find alternative premises and to conduct their services in secret. The English-speaking minority mostly adhered to the Church of Ireland or, especially in Ulster, to Presbyterianism. In 1833, the two provinces of Dublin and Cashel were merged. Over the centuries, numerous dioceses were merged, in view of declining membership. The same is true for this diocese where it can be seen that each of the entities listed in the title would have been a diocese in its own right. It is for this reason that the united diocese has six cathedrals.

=== Previous entities ===
The bishoprics of Ferns and Leighlin were united in 1597. Over 238 years, there were twenty-nine bishops of that united diocese.

Under the Church Temporalities (Ireland) Act 1833 (3 & 4 Will. 4. c. 37), the united bishopric of Ferns and Leighlin merged with the bishopric of Ossory to form the United Dioceses of Ossory, Ferns and Leighlin on 12 July 1835. Over the next 142 years, there were twelve bishops of that united diocese.

Under the same Act, the Archdiocese of Cashel and Emly merged with the United Dioceses of Waterford and Lismore from 14 August 1833. The resultant union was styled the "United Dioceses of Cashel and Waterford".

In 1977, the see of "Ossory, Ferns and Leighlin" merged with the neighbouring see of the United Dioceses of Cashel and Waterford. The resultant union was styled the "United Dioceses of Cashel and Ossory"; it is this entity which continues in existence today.

At a specially convened Synod of the United Diocese of Cashel and Ossory and the Diocese of Ferns held on Saturday 25 May 2013, it was decided that the Diocese of Ferns, which had operated as an autonomous entity with its own Diocesan Council and Synod, would be fully merged with the Diocese of Cashel and Ossory to constitute the United Diocese of Cashel, Ferns and Ossory. This change came into effect on the occasion of the Diocesan Synod held at Enniscorthy, County Wexford on Wednesday 23 October 2013.

The Ossory Clerical Society/Association was an evangelical organisation founded by Church of Ireland Clergy in Ossory in 1800.

== Cathedrals of the united diocese ==
- St. John's Cathedral, Cashel.
- Christ Church Cathedral, Waterford.
- St Carthage's Cathedral, Lismore.
- St. Canice's Cathedral, Kilkenny (Ossory).
- St Edan's Cathedral, Ferns.
- St Laserian's Cathedral, Old Leighlin.

== List of Bishops of Cashel and Ossory ==
- 1977–1980: John Armstrong
- 1980–1997: Noel Willoughby
- 1997–2002: John Neill
- 2002–2006: Peter Barrett
- 2006–2022: Michael Burrows
- 2022 - : Adrian Wilkinson

== Education and faith development ==
From 2010 the diocese ran the Certificate in Christian Studies for lay Anglicans, accredited by St. Patrick's College, Maynooth (Pontifical University), and hosted at the NUI Maynooth Campus, St. Kieran's College.

== See also ==
- List of Anglican dioceses in the United Kingdom and Ireland
- Roman Catholic Archdiocese of Cashel and Emly
- Roman Catholic Diocese of Waterford and Lismore
- Roman Catholic Diocese of Ossory
- Roman Catholic Diocese of Ferns
- Roman Catholic Diocese of Kildare and Leighlin
- Archdeacon of Waterford
- Archdeacon of Ferns
- Archdeacon of Cashel
- Archdeacon of Lismore
- Archdeacon of Ossory
