= Edward Thomas =

Edward Thomas may refer to:

== Sport ==
- Edward Thomas (gridiron football) (born 1974), American gridiron football player
- Edward Thomas (rower), Australian rower at the 1924 Olympics
- Ned Thomas (rugby league) (Edward Thomas), rugby league footballer of the 1910s, and 1920s for Wales, Oldham, and Wakefield Trinity
- Eddie Thomas (footballer, born 1933) (1933–2003), English footballer with Everton, Blackburn Rovers, Swansea Town and Derby County
- Eddie Thomas (footballer, born 1932) (1932–2020), English footballer with Southampton
- Eddie Thomas (Australian footballer) (1891–1953), Australian rules footballer with Collingwood
- Eddie Thomas (boxer) (1926–1997), Welsh boxer
- Ed Thomas (1950–2009), American football coach
- Edward Arthur Thomas (1950–2009), American high school football coach

== Writers ==
- Edward Thomas (poet) (1878–1917), Anglo-Welsh poet and journalist
- Edward J. Thomas (1869–1958), librarian and author of several books on the history of Buddhism

== Military ==
- Edward Thomas (British Army officer) (1915–1999), World War II Military Cross recipient and temporary brigadier
- Edward Lloyd Thomas (1825–1898), Confederate American Civil War general
- Edward Thomas (British Army soldier) (1884–1939), who fired the first shot of the British Army in World War I

== Others ==
- Edward Thomas (planter) (179?–1853), Bajan slave owner and attorney
- Edward A. Thomas (1838–1890), justice of the Territorial Wyoming Supreme Court
- Edward B. Thomas (1848–1929), United States district judge
- Edward Russell Thomas (1875–1926), American businessman, sportsman and owner of the New York Morning Telegraph
- Edward Thomas (antiquarian) (1813–1886), English civil servant of the East India Company
- Edward Thomas (character), character from the Disney Channel sitcom That's So Raven
- Eddie Kaye Thomas (born 1980), American film, television, and stage actor
- E. Donnall Thomas (1920–2012), American physician and winner of the Nobel Prize in Physiology or Medicine
- Edward Thomas (MP) (fl. 1625–1629), member of parliament (MP) for West Looe
- Edward Thomas (police officer) (1919–2015), African-American member of the Houston Police Department
- Edward Lloyd Thomas (surveyor) (1785–1852), surveyor in the U.S. state of Georgia
- Edward Thomas (physicist), African-American professor at Auburn University
- Edward Thomas (priest) (1700–1753), Anglican priest in Ireland
- Edward W. Thomas, United States Air Force general
- Ned Thomas (born 1936, Edward Morley Thomas), Welsh intellectual, editor and cultural commentator

== Transportation ==
- Edward Thomas (locomotive), a steam locomotive on the Talyllyn Railway, Wales, named after the railway's former manager

== See also ==
- Eddy Thomas (c.1932–2014), Jamaican dancer, choreographer and dance instructor
- Ted Thomas (disambiguation)
