= Robert Travers =

Robert Travers may refer to:

- Robert Travers (cricketer) (born 1982), English cricketer
- Robert Travers (bishop), Bishop of Leighlin
- Robert Travers (MP) (c. 1596–1647), Irish judge, soldier and politician
- R. Travers Herford (1860–1950), British Unitarian minister and scholar
