= Robert Stannard =

Robert Stannard may refer to:

- Robert Stannard (bishop) (1895–1986), Anglican clergyman
- Robert Stannard (priest), Anglican priest in Ireland
- Robert Stannard (Royal Navy officer)
- Robert Stannard (cyclist) (born 1998), Australian cyclist
