= Barzillai Jones =

Barzillai Jones was Dean of Lismore from 1683 until 1690.

He was the son of Jenkin Jones of Llanthetty, Brecknockshire and was educated at Jesus College, Oxford. He was Treasurer of Waterford from 1684 to 1686; and Chancellor from then until 1890.

Religious titles
| Preceded by Edward Jones | Dean of Lismore; 1683–1690 | Succeeded by William Jephson |
