= Michael Burrows (bishop) =

Bishop in the Church of Ireland

The Right Reverend Michael Burrows
- Bishop of Tuam, Limerick and Killaloe
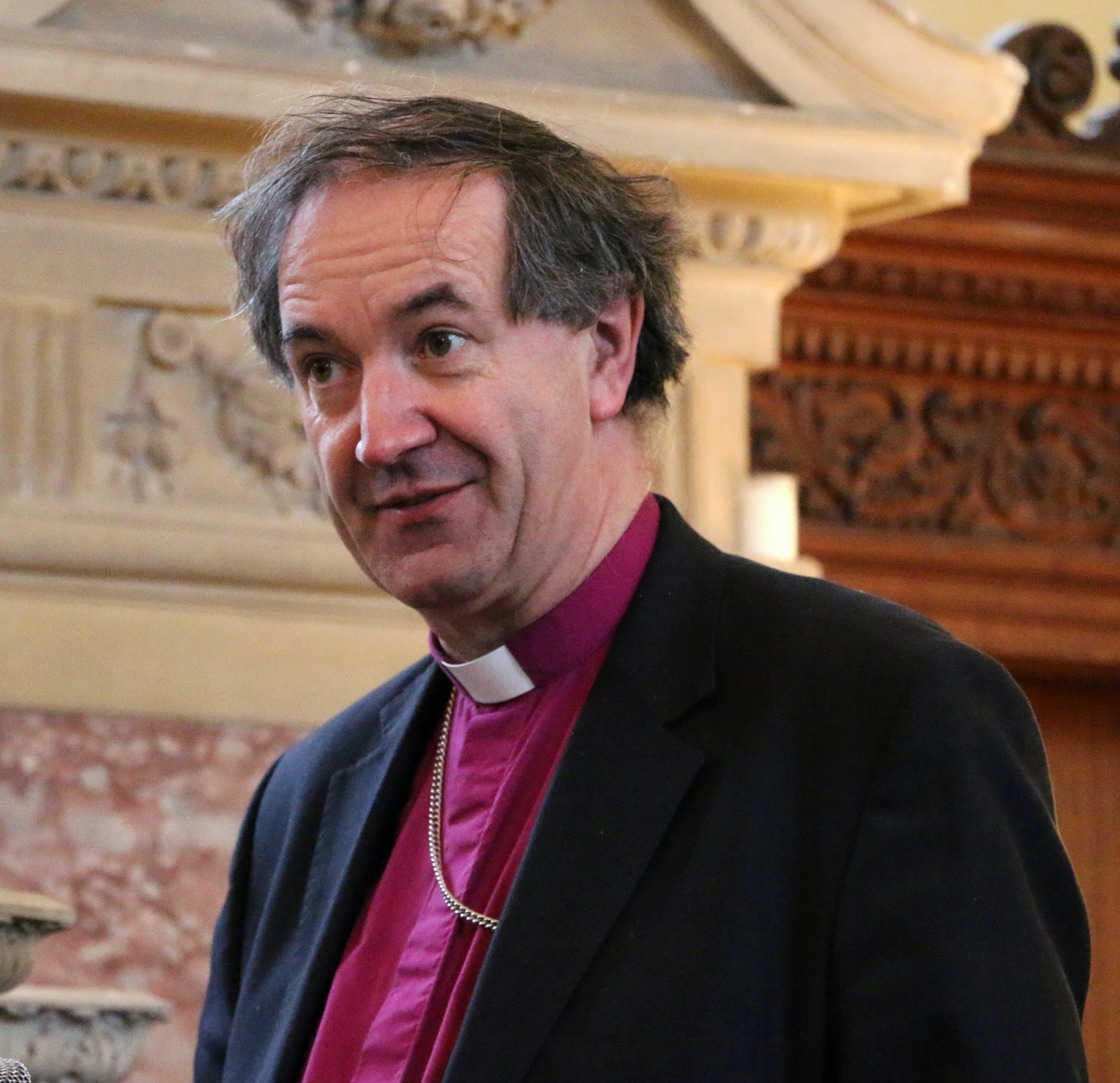
- Bishop Michael Burrows in 2016
- Church: Church of Ireland
- Province: Dublin
- Diocese: Tuam, Limerick and Killaloe
- Elected: 2022
- Predecessor: Kenneth Kearon (as Bishop of Limerick and Killaloe); Patrick Rooke (as Bishop of Tuam, Killala and Achonry)
- Other posts: Bishop of Cashel and Ossory (2006–2022); Dean of Cork (2002–2006)

Orders
- Ordination: 1988
- Consecration: 3 July 2006 by John Neill

Personal details
- Born: Michael Andrew James Burrows
- Education: Wesley College; Trinity College, Dublin

Michael Andrew James Burrows (born 1961) is a bishop in the Church of Ireland. He was elected Bishop of the Diocese of Tuam, Limerick and Killaloe on 14 January 2022, having previously served as Bishop of Cashel, Ferns and Ossory.

== Life ==
Bishop Burrows is the son of a Church of Ireland clergyman. He was educated at Wesley College, Dublin and Trinity College, Dublin and ordained as a priest in the Church of Ireland in 1988.

His first post was as a curate at St Luke, Douglas. Burrows was then a Minor Canon at St Patrick's Cathedral, Dublin from 1991 until 1994. He was then in charge at St Peter, Bandon from 1994 until his appointment as Dean.

He was appointed Dean of Cork at the Cathedral Church of St Fin Barre in 2002. He was elected Bishop of Cashel and Ossory on 31 March 2006 and consecrated at Christ Church Cathedral, Dublin on 3 July 2006. He replaced the Right Reverend Peter Barrett, who resigned as bishop following the breakdown of his marriage.

He is married and has four children. He is described as liberal and a supporter of same-sex unions.

Anglican Communion titles
Preceded by Michael Jackson	Dean of Cork; 2002–2006	Succeeded by Nigel Dunne
Preceded by Peter Barrett	Bishop of Cashel and Ossory; 2006–2022	Succeeded by Adrian Wilkinson
Preceded by Kenneth Kearon as Bishop of Limerick and Killaloe; Patrick Rooke as Bishop of Tuam, Killala and Achonry	Bishop of Tuam, Limerick and Killaloe; Since 2022	Incumbent
