= Gerald FitzGerald (Dean of Lismore) =

Gerald FitzJames FitzGerald was a sixteenth-century priest in Ireland: he was Dean of Lismore from 1564 until his deprivation in 1583.

Church of Ireland titles
Preceded by Peter Lewis	Dean of Lismore; 1564–1583	Succeeded by John Prendergast
