= John Alcock (priest) =

Irish priest

John Alcock was Dean of Ferns from 1747 until 1769. His father, Alexander Alcock, was Dean of Lismore from 1725 until 1747.

== Notes ==
Church of Ireland titles
Preceded by Robert Watts	Dean of Ferns; 1747–1769	Succeeded by Richard Marlay
