= Matthew Sanders =

Matthew Sanders may refer to:

- Matthew Sanders (bishop), Irish Roman Catholic bishop
- Matthew Sanders (parenting researcher), parenting researcher and professor at the University of Queensland
- M. Shadows (Matthew Charles Sanders), American singer
- Matt "Skitz" Sanders, Australian drummer

== See also ==
- Matthew Saunders, English footballer
