= Robert Daborne (priest) =

Irish priest

Robert Daborne was a priest in Ireland during the 17th century.

Daborne was Chancellor of Waterford from 1619 until 1623; and Dean of Lismore (also holding the Prebendary of Ballintemple in commendam) from 1621 until his death on 23 March 1628.
