= Montague Browne =

The Very Reverend and Honourable Montague Browne
- Dean of Lismore
- Church: Church of Ireland
- In office: 1850–1884
- Predecessor: Thomas Townsend
- Successor: Henry Brougham

Personal details
- Born: Henry Montague Browne; 3 October 1799
- Died: 24 November 1884 (aged 85)
- Spouse: Catherine Penelope de Montmorency (m. 1822)
- Children: 4
- Parents: James Browne, 2nd Baron Kilmaine (father); Anne Cavendish (mother)
- Relatives: Charles Lindsay (son-in-law)

Henry Montague Browne (3 October 1799 – 24 November 1884) was the Dean of Lismore from 1850 to 1884.

He was the second son of James Browne, 2nd Baron Kilmaine. He began his ecclesiastical career with a curacy at Christ Church Cathedral, Waterford. After that he was Rector of Shanrahan then Clonmel.

== Marriage ==
He married Catherine Penelope de Montmorency, daughter of Lodge Evans de Montmorency, 1st Viscount Frankfort de Montmorency on 11 April 1822. Their fourth child and second daughter, Augusta, married Arthur Cavendish-Bentinck. She became the first Baroness Bolsover.

Religious titles
| Preceded by Thomas Stewart Townsend | Dean of Lismore; 1850–1884 | Succeeded by Henry Brougham |
