= John Prendergast (priest) =

- Known for: Dean of Lismore (1583-1610)

John Prendergast was a priest in Ireland during the late 16th and early 17th centuries. He was Dean of Lismore from 1583 until his resignation in 1610 when he became a prebendary of Cashel.

Church of Ireland titles
Preceded by Gerald FitzJames FitzGerald	Dean of Lismore; 1583–1610	Succeeded by Thomas Wilson
