= Gilbert Mayes =

Gilbert Mayes was Dean of Lismore from 1961 until 1987.

He was born in 1915, educated at Trinity College, Dublin and ordained in 1945. After a curacy in Armagh he held incumbencies at Donaghmore and Dundalk. He was the first secretary of Societas Liturgica.

Religious titles
Preceded by Charles Geoffrey Nason Stanley	Dean of Lismore; 1961–1987	Succeeded by Cecil William Weekes
