= Alexander Alcock (dean of Lismore) =

Irish cleric

Alexander Alcock was Dean of Lismore from 1725 until 1747: his son, John was Dean of Ferns from 1747 until 1769; while another, Alexander, was Archdeacon of Lismore from 1753 until 1787.

== Notes ==
Church of Ireland titles
Preceded by William Burscough	Dean of Lismore; 1725–1747	Succeeded by Washington Cotes
