= Robert Parry =

Robert Parry may refer to:

- Robert Parry (poet) (1540–1612), Elizabethan Welsh poet
- Robert Parry (priest), Dean of Lismore from 1647 to 1660
- R. Williams Parry (1884–1956), 20th-century Welsh poet
- Robert Parry (politician) (1933–2000), British politician
- Robert W. Parry (1917–2006), American chemist
- Robert Parry (journalist) (1949–2018), American journalist
- Bob Parry (born 1953), Australian cricket umpire

== See also ==
- Robert Perry
- Robin Parry, Christian theologian
