= Henry Brougham (priest) =

Henry William Brougham, was Dean of Lismore from 1884 until his death on 11 April 1913.

He was educated at Trinity College, Dublin and began his ecclesiastical career with a curacy in Cork. He held incumbencies at Moynalty, and Eirke. He was Rural Dean of Rathdowney from 1870 to 1877.

Religious titles
Preceded by Henry Montague Browne	Dean of Lismore; 1884–1913	Succeeded by George Samuel Mayers
