= Edward Thomas (priest) =

Anglican priest

Edward Thomas (1700-1753) was Anglican priest in Ireland in the mid 18th century.

Thomas was born in Headford and educated at Trinity College, Dublin. A Prebendary of Lismore Cathedral, Ireland, he was Archdeacon of Lismore from 1751 until his death in 1753. Thomas is buried in the grounds of Waterford Cathedral.
