= Washington Cotes =

Washington Cotes was Dean of Lismore from 1747 until 1762; and Provost of Tuam from 1858 to 1862.

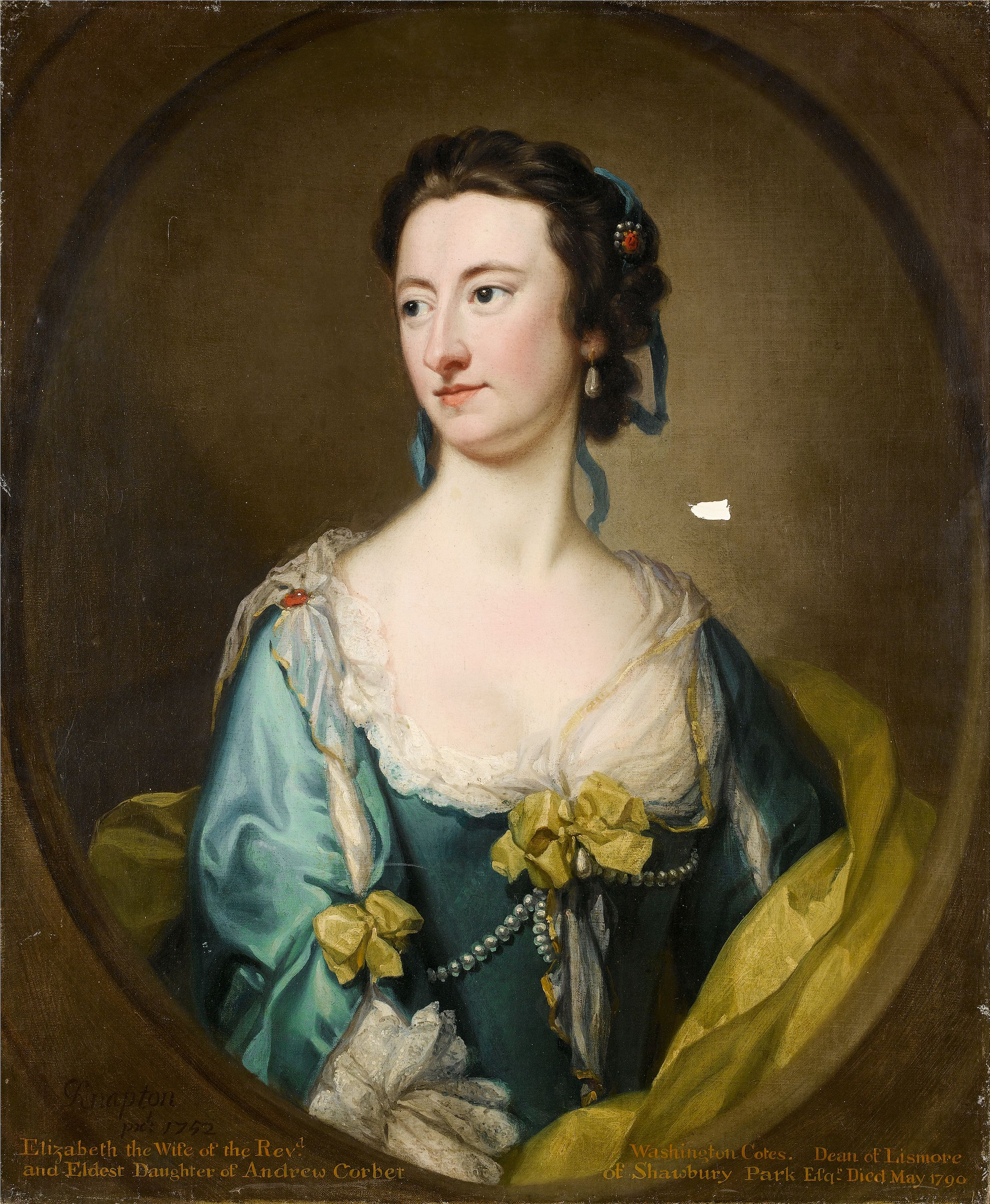
Elizabeth Corbet (1721-1790), the wife of the Rev. Washington Cotes, and eldest daughter of Andrew Corbet, Esq. of Shawbury Park, painting by George Knapton, 1752.

He was educated at Trinity College, Dublin. His wife was born in 1722 and died in 1790.

Religious titles
Preceded by Daniel Beaufort	Provost of Tuam; 1758–1762	Succeeded by Dudley Charles Ryder
Preceded by Alexander Alcock	Dean of Lismore; 1747–1762	Succeeded by John Ryder
