= Diocese of Cashel =

Diocese of Cashel may refer to:

- Roman Catholic Archdiocese of Cashel and Emly
- Anglican Diocese of Cashel and Ossory and its predecessors
