= Bill Bowder =

Irish Anglican priest

Reginald William Maxwell Bowder was Dean of Lismore from 1987 to 1989.

Bowder was ordained in 1981. Also a journalist, he has been chaplain to the University of Kent and an associate priest at Rotherfield Greys. He served as Rector of Donoughmore, Donard and Dunlavin.

In 2015 he became a Roman Catholic.
