= John Leslie (priest) =

John Herbert Leslie (1868–1934) was Dean of Lismore from 1930 until 1934.

He was educated at Trinity College, Dublin and ordained in 1894. He began his ecclesiastical career with a curacy at Christ Church Cathedral, Waterford. After that he was Rector of Shanrahan then Clonmel.

Religious titles
Preceded by William George Greene	Dean of Lismore; 1930–1934	Succeeded by Charles Geoffrey Nason Stanley
