= James Healey (priest) =

Dean of Lismore

James Christopher Healey (born 1944) was Dean of Lismore from 1997 until 1999.

After curacies in Boultham and Grimsby he held incumbencies at Narraghmore and New Ross.
