= Theodore Thomas =

Theodore Thomas may refer to:

- T. Gaillard Thomas (1832–1903), American gynecologist
- Theodore Thomas (conductor) (1835–1905), American violinist and conductor
- Theodore L. Thomas (1920–2005), American science fiction writer
- Theodore M. Thomas (1870–?), American lawyer and politician in Wisconsin
- Theodore Thomas (alderman) (born 1969), American politician, Chicago alderman
- Theodore Thomas (filmmaker), American film director and producer

== See also ==
- Ted Thomas (disambiguation)
