= Jonas Blaymire =

18th-century Irish draughtsman

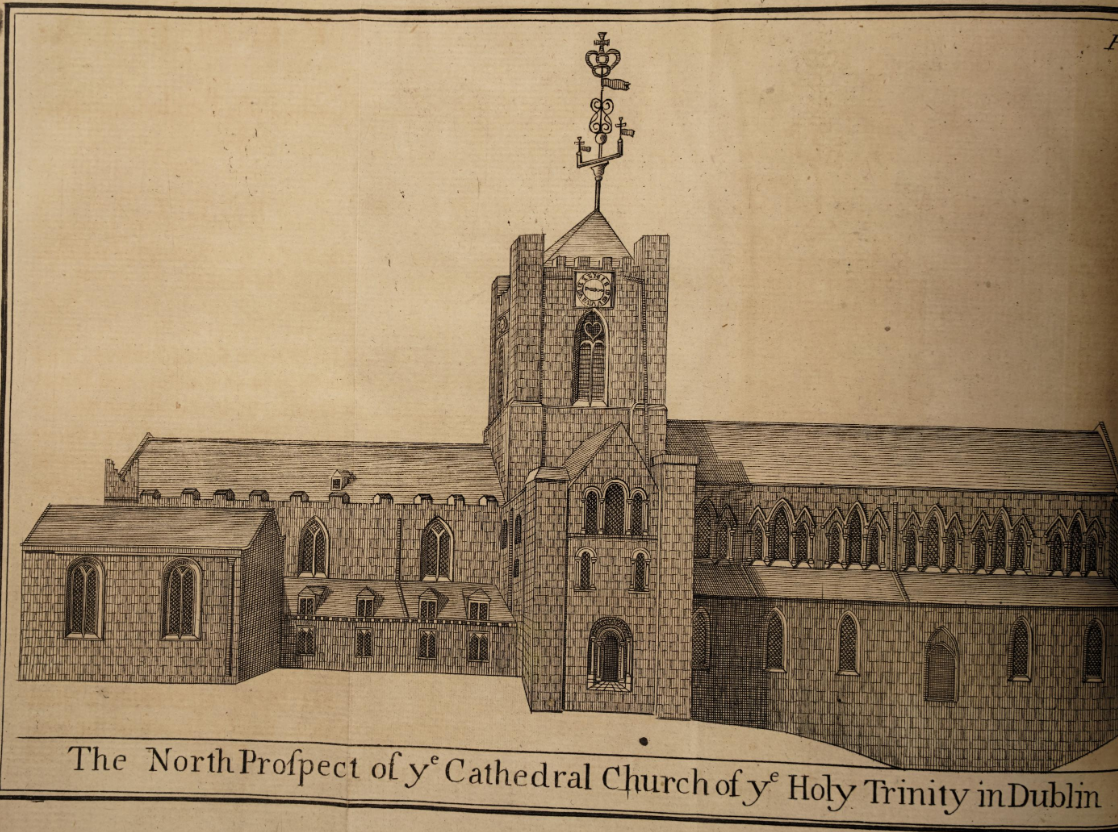
Illustration of Christ Church Cathedral, Dublin, c. 1739

Jonas Blaymire (died 1763) was an architectural draughtsman, surveyor and measurer likely of Yorkshire or County Durham origins active in Dublin and Ireland for much of the 18th century from at least 1736 until his death in 1763.

It is supposed that he may be the Mr "Bell Mires" that taught Thomas Ivory draughtsmanship. His name is also at times spelled Blaymyre.

He is most known today for a series of illustrations commissioned by Walter Harris for Historiographorum Aliorumque Scriptorum Hiberniae Commentarium: or, a history of the Irish writers (1736), Ware's Works (1738) and The History and Antiquities of the City of Dublin: From the Earliest Accounts (1766) all of which featured original illustrations as well as adapted works from earlier illustrations of buildings within Charles Brooking's map of Dublin (1728).

He died at Loughboy, County Kilkenny on 12 June 1763.

== Notable illustrations ==
Some of his notable illustrations and drawings include:

- Armagh Cathedral
- Lismore Cathedral
- Kildare Cathedral
- St Patrick's Cathedral, Dublin
- Christ Church Cathedral, Dublin
- St Columb's Cathedral,
- Cloyne Cathedral
- St Canice's Cathedral
- Cashel Cathedral
- Clonmacnoise
- Cathedral of the Most Holy Trinity, Waterford

== See also ==
- Charles Brooking's map of Dublin (1728)
- A Picturesque and Descriptive View of the City of Dublin
- Joseph Tudor
