= Edward Brouncker =

Edward Brouncker, D.D. was a 17th-century Anglican priest.

Brouncker graduated from St Edmund Hall, Oxford in 1609 and became a Fellow at Wadham College, Oxford. He held livings at Cropredy, Ladbroke and Eccleston; and was Dean of Lismore during 1621.
