= Arthur Gwynn (priest) =

Anglican priest

Arthur Gwynn was an Anglican priest in Ireland in the first half of the 17th century.

Gwynn was ordained on 1 December 1592. He was appointed Archdeacon of Lismore in 1638. Gwynn owed his preferment to the Lord Deputy of Ireland, Thomas Wentworth, 1st Earl of Strafford,
