= Latham Warren =

Latham Coddington Warren, MA (4 April 1831 – 5 November 1912) was Archdeacon of Lismore from 1896 until 1912.

Burkitt was educated at Trinity College, Dublin and ordained in 1855. After a curacy in Rathangan, County Wexford he held incumbencies at Lucan, Balbriggan, Kingstown, Dublin and Clonmel.
