= Thomas O'Fihelly =

Thomas O'Fihelly, a Franciscan friar from County Cork, Ireland, was Bishop of Leighlin from 1555 to 1567.

Church of Ireland titles
Preceded by Robert Travers	Bishop of Leighlin; 1555–1567	Succeeded by Daniel Cavanagh
