= Robert Stannard (priest) =

Anglican priest

Robert Stannard was an Anglican priest in Ireland in the 17th century.

Stannard was educated at Trinity College, Dublin. He was a Minor Canon at St Patrick's Cathedral, Dublin from 1677 to 1681. He was Chancellor of Ferns from 1681 until his death in 1686; and also Vicar general of the Diocese. He was also Chancellor of Leighlin from 1683 to 1686; and the Archdeacon of Lismore from 1685 until 1686.
