= Richard Leslie (priest) =

Anglican priest (died 1804)

Richard Leslie (born after 1744, died Madras, India, 28 June 1804) was an Anglican priest in Ireland and India in the 18th century.

Leslie was born in Derry, one of the numerous children of James Leslie, Bishop of Limerick, Ardfert and Aghadoe and Joyce Lyster, and grew up at Tarbert, County Kerry. Sir Edward Leslie, 1st and last Baronet of Tarbert, was his eldest brother. He was educated at Trinity College, Dublin. He was Archdeacon of Aghadoe from 1769 to 1790, when he was removed as an absentee.

As a young clergyman, he seems to have led an unsettled and extravagant lifestyle, and spent some time in a debtors' prison. He served for some years as a chaplain in the Royal Navy. He neglected his duties as Archdeacon to the point where he was deprived for non-attendance.

Thereafter he settled in India, ministering to the employees of the East India Company. In contrast to his rather unsatisfactory early career, he became a conscientious and much-loved pastor during his years in India. He died of a stroke in Madras in the summer of 1804. His tomb in Madras Cathedral was sculpted by John Flaxman in London and shipped to India.
