= Edmund Thomas =

Edmund Thomas may refer to:

- Ted Thomas (judge) (Sir Edmund Walter Thomas, born 1934), New Zealand jurist
- Edmund Thomas (Parliamentarian) (1633–1677), Welsh politician
- Edmund Thomas (footballer), see UNCAF Nations Cup 2001 squads

== See also ==
- Edmond Thomas (born 1954), American businessman
- Ted Thomas (disambiguation)
