= James Leslie (bishop) =

James Leslie was an eighteenth-century bishop of the Church of Ireland.

Leslie was born in 1706 at Tarbert, County Kerry, son of James Leslie and Sarah Kelly, and educated at Trinity College Dublin. He was curate at Swords, County Dublin, then perpetual curate at St Nicholas Within, Dublin and finally Rector of Lamesley. In 1755 he became Bishop of Limerick, Ardfert and Aghadoe, serving until his death on 24 November 1770. He lived at Tarbert House, which his family built about 1690, and which still stands.

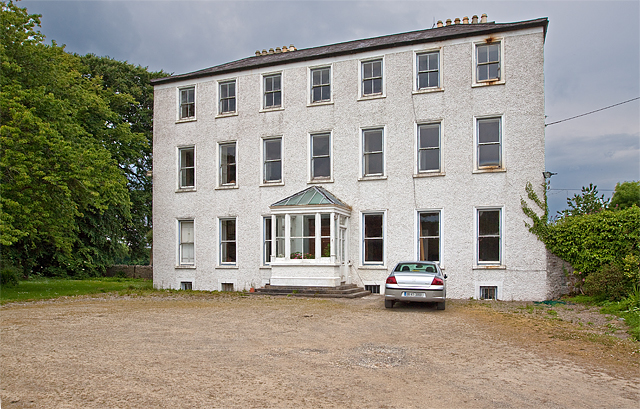
Tarbert House, Tarbert, County Kerry, the Bishop's family home

He married Joyce Lyster, daughter of Anthony Lyster of Lysterfield, County Roscommon and Elizabeth Warren, by whom he was the father of a numerous family, including Sir Edward Leslie (1744–1818), 1st and last of the Leslie Baronets of Tarbert, Richard Leslie, Archdeacon of Aghadoe (died 1804), Martha (died 1831), who married James Lowry of Rockdale, County Tyrone, and Catherine, who married James Scott of Willsborough, County Londonderry.

Church of Ireland titles
Preceded by William Burscough	Bishop of Limerick, Ardfert and Aghadoe; 1755–1770	Succeeded by John Averell
