= William Beare =

Irish Christian clergyman (1933–2019)

William Beare (1933 – 15 March 2019) was an Irish clergyman in the Church of Ireland who was Dean of Lismore from 1999 to 2008.

== Biography ==
Beare was born in 1933. He was educated at the Trinity College, Dublin and ordained in 1960. After curacies at Waterford and Cork he held incumbencies in Rathcormac, Monkstown and Stradbally. Beare died at Cork University Hospital on 15 March 2019.
