= John Ryland (priest) =

Irish Anglican priest

John Frederic Ryland was an Irish Anglican priest.

Ryland was born in Waterford and educated at Trinity College, Dublin. After curacies in Elstead and Waithe he was Rector of Tallow, County Waterford. He was Archdeacon of Lismore from 1869 to 1896.
