= Charles Stanley (priest) =

Charles Geoffrey Nason Stanley was Dean of Lismore from 1934 until 1960.

He was born on 10 November 1884 and educated at Trinity College, Dublin. He was ordained in 1908 and began his ecclesiastical career with curacies at Drumcannon and Cappoquin. He held incumbencies in Kilrossanty and Lismore. His son was killed during World War II.

Religious titles
Preceded by John Herbert Leslie	Dean of Lismore; 1934–1961	Succeeded by Gilbert Mayes
