= Robert Perry =

Robert or Bob Perry may refer to:

== Sportspeople ==
- Bob Perry (baseball) (1934–2017), American baseball player
- Bob Perry (footballer) (1893–?), Scottish footballer
- Bob Perry (tennis) (born 1933), American tennis player
- Robert Perry (sailor) (1909–1987), British sailor

== Others ==
- Bob J. Perry (1932–2013), Houston builder and political funder
- Robert Perry (actor) (1878–1962), American film actor
- B. G. Perry (1931–2016), Mississippi politician
- Robert H. Perry (1924–1978), editor of Perry's Chemical Engineers' Handbook
- Robert J. Perry, American physicist
- Robert P. Perry, American biologist
- Robert Perry (writer), Welsh television writer
- Robert Perry (yacht designer), American designer of modern cruising yachts
- Robert Thompson Perry (born 1960), American author and teacher
- Bob Perry (producer), who produced many on the List of songs recorded by Tupac Shakur

== See also ==
- Robert Parry (disambiguation)
- Robert Peary (1856–1920), American explorer known for his expedition to the North Pole
