= Ted Thomas =

Ted Thomas may refer to:

- Ted Thomas (judge) (born 1934), New Zealand jurist
- Ted Thomas Sr. (1935–2020), American cleric
- Ted Thomas (footballer, born 1898) (1898–1965), Australian rules football player at the Melbourne Football Club
- Ted Thomas (footballer, born 1922) (1922–1996), Australian rules football player at the North Melbourne Football Club
- Ted Thomas (priest) (1927–2023), British Church of England priest
- Ted Thomas (rower) (1894–1943), Australian rower
- Teddy Thomas (rugby union) (born 1993), French rugby union player
- Edwin "Guboo" Ted Thomas (1909–2002), Aboriginal elder

== See also ==
- Theodore Thomas (disambiguation)
- Edward Thomas (disambiguation)
- Edmund Thomas (disambiguation)
