= Robert Travers (bishop) =

Robert Travers was Bishop of Leighlin from 1550 to 1555 when Queen Mary deposed him for being a married man.

Church of Ireland titles
Preceded by Matthew Sanders	Bishop of Leighlin; 1550–1555	Succeeded by Thomas O'Fihelly
