= William Burscough =

English Anglican priest

William Burscough was an eighteenth-century English Anglican priest.

Burscough matriculated at Brasenose College Oxford in 1692, where his matriculation record gave his father as John Burscough, cleric, of Stoke, Surrey. He moved in 1694 to Wadham College, being appointed a Fellow in 1699. In 1712 was appointed Rector of Stoke-next-Guildford, Surrey, which had been his father's living until his death in 1707. He became Dean of Lismore in 1725; and was Bishop of Limerick, Ardfert and Aghadoe from 1725 until his death on 3 April 1755.

It has been said that he was the son of Robert Burscough, Archdeacon of Barnstaple from 1703 until 1709, but this seems to be incorrect. Contemporary documents name him (as "Rt Rev Wm Burscough, Bishop of Limerick") as dealing with the property in Hertfordshire previously owned by the Bownests, his mother's family.

Church of Ireland titles
Preceded by John Francis	Dean of Lismore; 1724–1725	Succeeded by Alexander Alcock
Preceded by Thomas Smyth	Bishop of Limerick, Ardfert and Aghadoe; 1725–1755	Succeeded by James Leslie
