= John Scott (dean of Lismore) =

Irish Anglican priest

John Scott (died 1828) was an Irish Anglican priest in the last decade of the 18th century and the first three of the 19th.

Scott was born in Kilkenny and educated at Trinity College, Dublin. He was Archdeacon of Clonfert from 1790 to 1796; and Dean of Lismore from 1796 until his death at Bath, Somerset, in 1828.
