= Michael Boyle (bishop of Waterford and Lismore) =

Irish bishop (1580–1635)

The Right Reverend Michael Boyle
- Bishop of Waterford and Lismore
- See: Waterford and Lismore
- Installed: 1619
- Term ended: 1635
- Predecessor: John Lancaster
- Successor: John Atherton
- Other post: Dean of Lismore

Orders
- Consecration: March 1620

Personal details
- Born: c. 1580
- Died: 27 December 1635
- Buried: Waterford Cathedral
- Denomination: Church of Ireland
- Education: Merchant Taylors' School; Trinity College, Oxford

Michael Boyle (c. 1580 – 27 December 1635), was Bishop of Waterford and Lismore.

== Biography ==
Boyle was born in London, as the son of Michael Boyle, and brother of Richard Boyle, Archbishop of Tuam. Michael Boyle entered Merchant Taylors' School, London, in 1587, and proceeded to St John's College, Oxford, in 1593. He took the degrees of B.A. (5 December 1597), M.A. (25 June 1601), B.D. (9 July 1607) and D.D. (2 July 1611).

Boyle became a fellow of his college, and no high opinion was entertained there of his probity in matters affecting his own interests. Boyle was appointed vicar of Finedon in Northamptonshire. Through the influence of his relative, Richard, Earl of Cork, became archdeacon of Cork and Cloyne, Dean of Lismore in 1614, and, finally, in 1619, Bishop of Waterford and Lismore.

Until his death in Waterford on 27 December 1635 Boyle held several other appointments: the chancellorship of Lismore and Cashel and the treasurership of Waterford. He was buried in Waterford Cathedral.

== Family ==
Boyle married twice; first to Dorothy Fish, daughter of George Fish of South Hill, Bedfordshire, and second to Christian, daughter of Thomas Bellott of Chester. Both marriages were childless. His brother Richard was the father of the younger Michael Boyle
