= Paul Draper (priest) =

Paul Richard Draper has been Dean of Lismore since 2009.

He was born in 1964, educated at the University of Glasgow and ordained in 1991. After a curacy at Drumragh he was the incumbent at Ballydehob from 1994 until 2009.
