= Ambrose Power =

Irish Anglican priest

The Venerable Ambrose Power (1801–1869) was an Irish Anglican priest. He was the son of Sir John Power, 1st Baronet (1771–1855) & his wife Harriet née Bushe.
Power was educated at Trinity College, Dublin. He was appointed Archdeacon of Lismore in 1828 and died in post on 8 November 1869.

== Family ==
He married firstly Susan Thacker in 1837, Susan died on the 7th August 1854 at Boulogne-sur-Mer, Pas-de-Calais, France.
They had at least eight children; including:
Mary (1844–1907) who married Henry Windsor Villiers-Stuart in 1863 Lismore Cathedral
Rebecca Zena who married Richard John Marshall 23 Sep 1858 Lismore Cathedral
Susan Caroline who married Reverend William Claypon Bellingham 22 Aug 1878 Lismore Cathedral

He married secondly Catherine Margaret Forde on the 29th Sep 1857 in St. George's Church, Dublin.
They had at least two sons
Ambrose William Bushe Power (23 Nov 1844-10 Mar 1907).
Robert Henry Power (1851-30 Aug 1894).
