= William Jephson (priest) =

William Jephson (died 11 April 1720) was Dean of Lismore from 1691 until 1720.

He was educated at Trinity College Dublin. He was a Minor Canon at St Patrick's Cathedral, Dublin then Rector of Monaghan and Prebendary of Donoughmore. His final appointment was at Inishlonaght.

He died on 11 April 1720.

Religious titles
Preceded by Barzillai Jones	Dean of Lismore; 1691–1720	Succeeded by Arthur Price
