= Walter Harris (historian) =

Irish historian (1686–1761)

Walter Harris Walter Harris
- Born: 1686
- Died: 1761 (aged 74–75)

Academic background
- Education: Kilkenny College; Trinity College

Walter Harris (1686–1761) was an Anglo-Irish historian and writer.

== Life ==
Harris was educated at Kilkenny College and Trinity College, Dublin. He married Elizabeth Ware, great-granddaughter of Sir James Ware, the historian, in 1716 and became vicar-general to the Archbishop of Meath in 1753.

Harris received a government pension in 1748, which enabled him to work on histories and religious writings. In the 1740s he was involved with the Physico-Historical Society, a similar society to the Royal Dublin Society, along with Robert Jocelyn, the politician; Dr. Samuel Madden, the philanthropist; Thomas Prior, the founder of the Royal Dublin Society; John Rutty the physician and naturalist; John Lodge, author of Peerage of Ireland; and Charles Smith, the topographer and historian.

Harris died at his house in Clarendon St., Dublin, in 1761.

== Works ==
In the 1730s, along with others of his time, Harris supported a scheme to compile and publish histories of all Irish counties. He also started to revise and republish the historical and topographical writings of Sir James Ware, translating them from Latin to English. The first to be published was Historiographorum Aliorumque Scriptorum Hiberniae Commentarium: or, a history of the Irish writers (Dublin, 1736). To increase the attractiveness of these books he commissioned from Jonas Blaymire drawings of buildings and their contents.

In 1752, in a book published in Dublin he bitterly attacked a book by John Curry published in London in 1747, a Brief Account from the most authentic Protestant writers of the Irish Rebellion, 1641, which was against partisan anti-Catholic history. In reply Curry published his Historical Memoirs, afterwards enlarged and published in 1775 under the title An Historical and Critical Review of the Civil Wars in Ireland.

In 1766, his work The History and Antiquities of the City of Dublin was published.

== See also ==
- John Rutty
- Mervyn Archdall
