= John Jaumaud =

Anglican priest

John Jaumard was Anglican priest in Ireland in the mid 18th century.

Of French descent, Jaumard was born in Arundel and educated at Clare College, Cambridge. He was ordained deacon on 20 December 1719, and priest on 13 March 1720... He held livings at Frome St Quintin, Ardmore and Ringagonagh. He was Archdeacon of Lismore from 1749 until his death in 1751. He was buried at Youghal.
