= John Francis (priest) =

Irish Anglican priest

John Francis was an Irish Anglican priest in the late 17th and early 18th centuries.

He was Prebendary of St Michael's at Christ Church Cathedral, Dublin from 1665 until 1705; Dean of Lismore from 1695 until 1723; and Dean of Leighlin from 1723 until his death a year later.
