= Alexander Alcock (junior) =

Irish Anglican priest

Alexander Alcock was an Irish Anglican priest.

The son of Alexander Alcock, Dean of Lismore from 1725 until 1747, he was educated at Trinity College, Dublin. He was Archdeacon of Lismore from 1753 until his death in 1787.
