= Robert Naylor (priest) =

Irish priest

Robert Naylor (died 1661) was a Seventeenth Century priest in Ireland.

A cousin of Richard Boyle, 1st Earl of Cork, he was ordained in 1625 and was Prebendary of Brigown in Cloyne Cathedral until he became Dean of Lismore in 1630. In 1640 he became Dean of Limerick, a post he held until his death in 1661.
