= Philip Ryan (priest) =

Irish Anglican priest

Philip Ryan was an Irish Anglican priest.

Ryan was born in County Tipperary and educated at Trinity College, Dublin. He was appointed Vicar choral and a prebendary of Lismore Cathedral, Ireland in 1802. In 1805 he became Rector of St. George's Church, Dublin. In 1810 he was appointed Archdeacon of Lismore, serving until his death in 1828.
