= Matthew Jones (priest) =

Anglican priest

Matthew Jones was an Anglican priest in Ireland in the 17th century.

Jones was born in Wales and educated at Trinity College, Dublin. He was the incumbent at Youghal; and Archdeacon of Lismore from 1684 to 1685.

His brother was Bishop of Cloyne from 1682 to 1692; and Bishop of St Asaph from 1692 to 1703.
