= John Ryder (priest) =

John Ryder was an Irish Anglican priest in the 18th-century.

The son of John Ryder, Archbishop of Tuam, he was educated at Trinity College, Dublin. He was Dean of Lismore from 1762 until his death on 18 April 1791.
