= Cecil Weekes =

Cecil William Weekes (1931–2012) was Dean of Lismore from 1990 until 1996.

He was the Non-Stipendiary Minister at Glenageary from 1978 to 1980 and Bishop's Vicar at Kilkenny Cathedral from then until 1983. He was the incumbent at Carlow from 1983 until 1990.
