= Robert Parry (priest) =

Anglican priest in 17th-century Ireland

Robert Parry was a 17th-century Anglican priest in Ireland.

A cousin of Edward Parry, Bishop of Killaloe, Robert Parry was Dean of Lismore from 1647 until his death in 1660.
