= George Mayers =

Irish Anglican priest

George Samuel Mayers (1860–1952) was an Irish Anglican priest.

He was educated at Trinity College, Dublin, BA 1885, ordained deacon in 1885, priest in 1886 and began his ecclesiastical career with a curacy at Clonagam, County Waterford 1885-86, and Holy Trinity Church, Waterford 1886. He held incumbencies at Tubrid 1890-92, Killaloan 1892-1900 and Dungarvan 1900-11. He was Canon and Treasurer of Waterford Cathedral from 1901. Dean of Lismore from 1913 until 1919 and Dean of Waterford from 1919-36. Died 26 October 1952, England.
