= Peter Lewis (priest) =

Peter Lewis was a sixteenth century priest in Ireland.

Lewis was Dean of Lismore from 1559 to 1564 and Precentor of Christ Church Cathedral, Dublin from 1561 to 1572.
