= Matthew Sanders (bishop) =

Matthew Sanders was an Irish Roman Catholic bishop in the sixteenth century.

He was promoted Bishop of Leighlin by Pope Clement VII on 11 April 1527. He swore the oath of supremacy at Clonmel early in 1539; and died on 23 (or 24) December 1549. He was buried at St Laserian's Cathedral, Old Leighlin
