= Peter Barrett (bishop) =

Irish bishop (1956–2015)

Peter Francis Barrett (8 February 1956 – 28 October 2015) was the Bishop of Cashel and Ossory in the Church of Ireland from 2002 to 2006.

== Life ==
Barrett studied at Trinity College Dublin and trained for ordination at the Church of Ireland Theological College. He was ordained deacon in 1981 and priest in 1982. Barrett, previously Dean of Waterford from 1998 to 2002, was elected as Bishop of Cashel and Ossory in the Church of Ireland on 4 November 2002 and consecrated at Christ Church Cathedral, Dublin on 25 January 2003. He resigned in 2006 following the breakdown of his marriage. He moved to England for a few years but eventually returned to Ireland.

His former wife, Anne, is a social worker with a health agency. They have three children, Clare, Alec and Patrick. Barrett's successor was Michael Burrows. On 28 October 2015, Barrett died at the age of 59.
