= Nigel Dunne =

Irish Dean of Cork (born 1966)

Nigel Kenneth Dunne
- Born: 1966 (age 59–60)
- Occupation: Dean of Cork

Nigel Kenneth Dunne (born 1966) has been Dean of Cork since 2007.

He was educated at Trinity College, Dublin and ordained in 1991. After curacies in Dublin he held incumbencies at Blessington and Bandon.
