= Thomas Wilson (dean of Lismore) =

Thomas Wilson was a priest in Ireland during the first half of the 17th century: he was Dean of Lismore from 1611 until 1614 and Dean of Dromore from 1621 until 1622.
