= Daniel Cavanagh (bishop) =

Bishop of Leighlin (1567–1589)

Daniel Cavanagh was Bishop of Leighlin from 1567 to 1589.
