= Molaise of Leighlin =

Irish abbot and saint

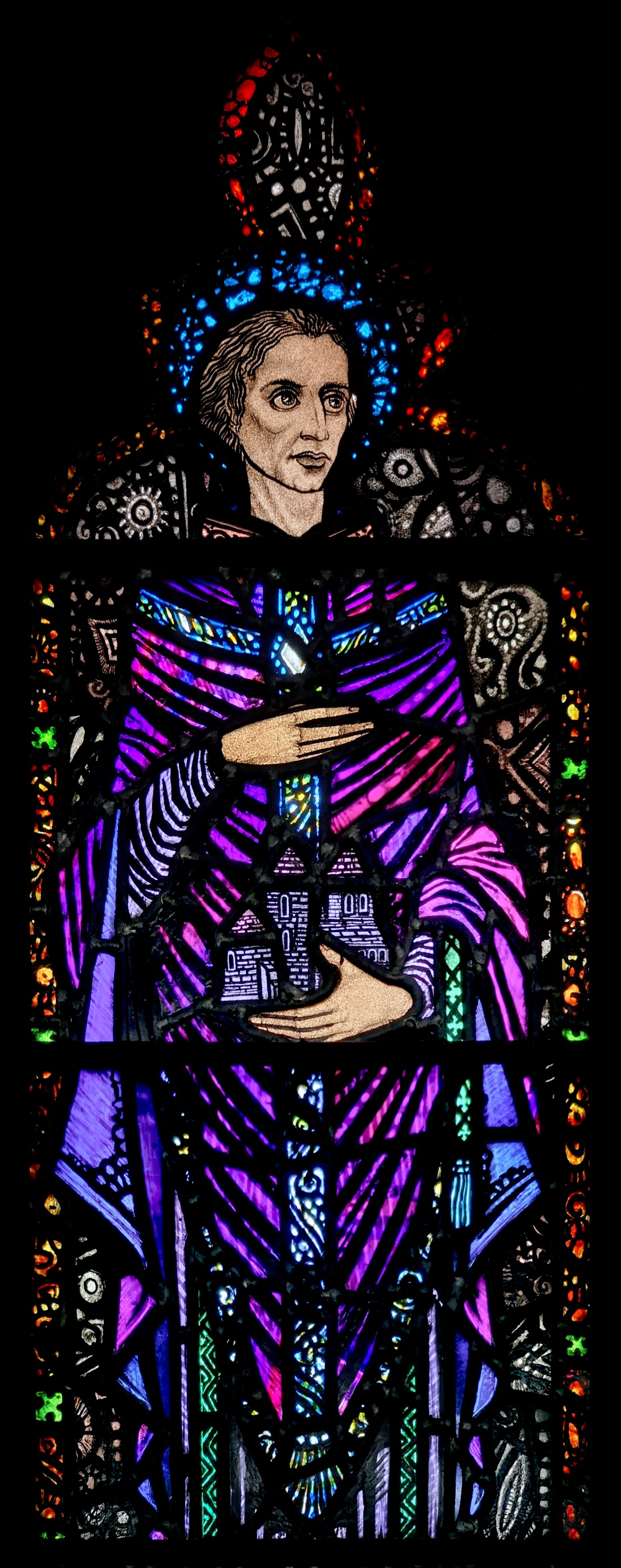
- Window by Harry Clarke Studios at St. Joseph's Carrickmacross
- Born: c.566 Ireland
- Died: 639; Ireland
- Venerated in: Roman Catholic Church; Eastern Orthodox Church; Anglican Communion (Church of Ireland)
- Feast: 18 April

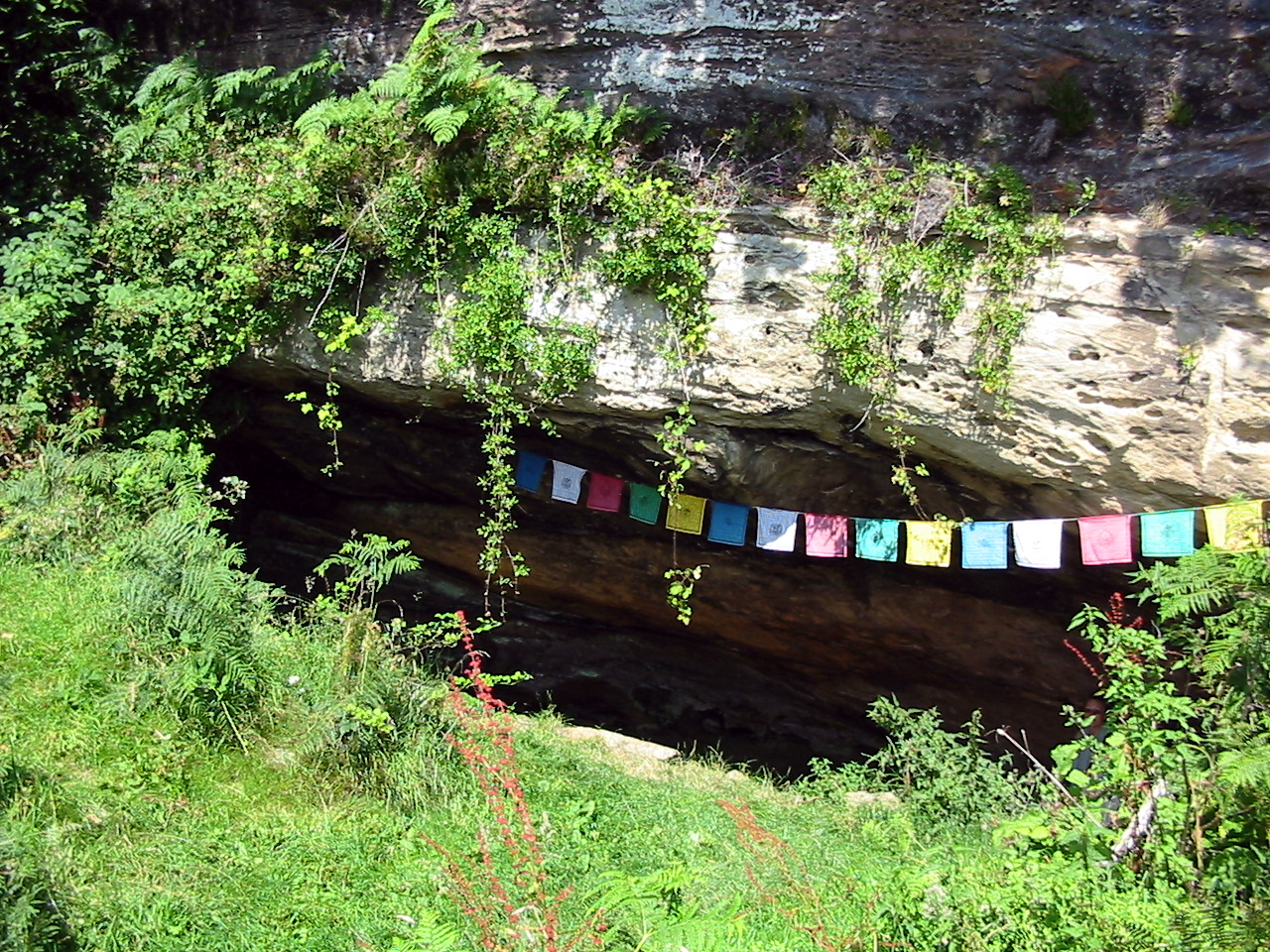
Saint Molaise's cave on Holy Isle, Firth of Clyde, decorated with Tibetan Buddhist prayer flags.

Saint Molaise of Leighlin, also Laisrén or Laserian (died ca. 639), was an early Irish saint and abbot of Lethglenn or Leithglenn, now Old Leighlin in County Carlow, who is supposed to have lived in the 6th and 7th centuries. In Scotland, he is known as "Molaise" while in Ireland he is revered as "Laserian".

== Life ==
Born in Ireland, Molaise was said to have been of noble birth. He was raised in Scotland, as a young man he lived the life of a hermit on Holy Isle (off the Isle of Arran). He then went to Rome, where he was ordained by Pope Gregory I.

He later entered the monastery at Old Leighlin in Ireland where he became abbot and possibly bishop. He adapted Church discipline in accordance with the practices of Rome. He introduced or advocated the Roman method of dating the celebration of Easter. When Molaise was in his late 50s, he went back to Rome and was consecrated bishop by Pope Honorius I.

According to Kuno Meyer, he is the Laisrén who is depicted in the Old Irish prose narrative The Vision of Laisrén, one of the earliest vernacular pieces of vision literature in Christian tradition. The extant fragment shows him leaving the monastery of Clúain (possibly Clonmacnois or Cloyne) to 'purify' the church of Clúain Cháin (unidentified) in Connaught. After a three nights' fast, his soul is taken up by two angels, who escort him to Hell to show him the horrors that await unredeemed sinners. The angels explain to one devil eager to take Laisrén from them that their guest is granted the vision in order that "he will give warning before us to his friends."

Molaise probably died circa 639. His feast day is celebrated on 18 April. In a note added to the Félire Óengusso, Molaise is said to have pulled out a hair from St Sillán's eyebrow which had the special property that anyone who saw it in the morning died instantly. Having thereby saved others, Molaise died. Because of the fiery connection between sunrise and Molaise's name, from lasair "flame", the anecdote has been interpreted as relating to solar mythology. His monastery thrived and gave its name to the diocese established in 1111 at the Synod of Ráith Bressail.

A large two piece statue of the saint from the medieval time is now located in the National Museum of Ireland. Until modern times the statue had been preserved in the Church of St. Molaise on the island of Inishmurray, County Sligo.

== See also ==
- St Goban — predecessor of Molaise as abbot of Leighlin.
