= Peter Lewis (dog trainer) =

Peter Lewis was a British dog trainer known for popularizing dog agility competitions. Lewis began his dog career in 1962, working on pet dog training before widening his scope to working dogs and obedience training. In the 1980s Lewis pioneered a number of methods in acclimating dogs to holding a course though the use of hoops and poles.

== Notable works ==
- Peter Lewis (1981). The Agility Dog. Canine Publications. ISBN 978-0-906422-04-5.
- Peter Lewis (1983). My Dog Basic Training Series. Canine. ISBN 978-0-906422-05-2.
- Peter Lewis (1981). The Agility Dog International. Canine. ISBN 978-0-906422-08-3.
