= St Laserian's Cathedral, Old Leighlin =

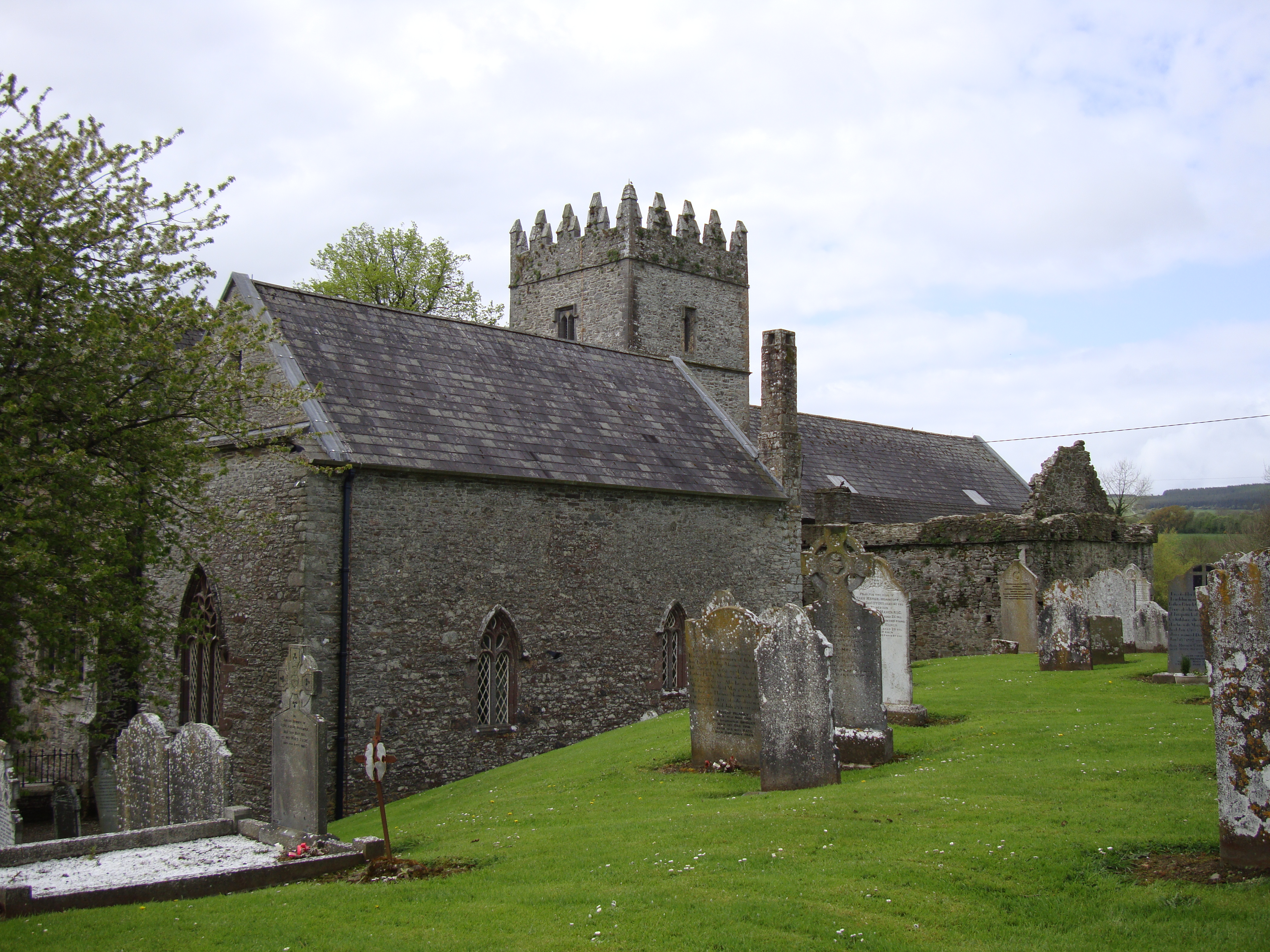
- St Laserian's Cathedral, Old Leighlin
- St Laserian's Cathedral, Old Leighlin
- 52°44′11″N 07°01′34″W
- Location: Old Leighlin, County Carlow, Leinster
- Country: Ireland
- Denomination: Church of Ireland
- Previous denomination: Roman Catholic
- Website: https://cashel.anglican.org/leighlin-cathedral/

History
- Founded: Early 7th century
- Founder: St Gobhan
- Dedication: St Laserian

Architecture
- Functional status: Active
- Architectural type: Church
- Style: Gothic
- Years built: 12th–16th centuries
- Groundbreaking: Early 7th century
- Completed: 16th century

Specifications
- Materials: Stone

Administration
- Province: Province of Dublin
- Diocese: Diocese of Cashel and Ossory

Clergy
- Bishop: The Right Reverend Adrian Wilkinson
- Dean: The Very Reverend Mairt Hanely

St Laserian's Cathedral, Old Leighlin, previously the cathedral of the Diocese of Leighlin, is now one of the six cathedral churches in the Diocese of Cashel and Ossory of the Church of Ireland. It is situated on the site of a mediaeval monastery in the village of Old Leighlin, County Carlow, Ireland, some 12 km south of Carlow town in the ecclesiastical province of Dublin.

== History ==
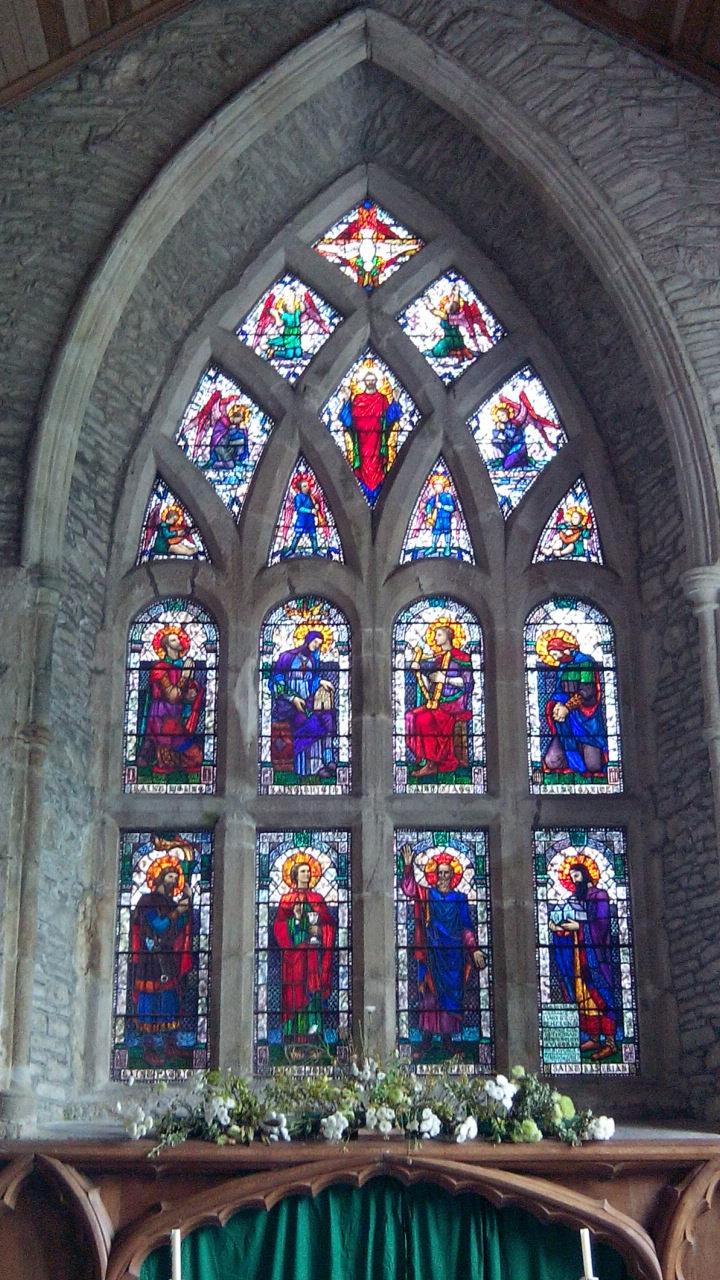
East Window, featuring 8 saints by Catherine Amelia O’Brien

A monastery was founded at Old Leighlin by St Gobhan early in the seventh century; he moved on and left the monastery under the direction of his brother, St Laisrén. In 630, it was the location of a synod, where St Laisrén convinced a group of Irish bishops to relinquish the Celtic method of calculating the date of Easter for the Roman one. The original monastic buildings were probably made of wood and were destroyed by fire, c.1060. Leighlin was named as one of five bishoprics of Leinster at the Synod of Ráth Breasail in 1111.

The present building was begun by Donat O'Kelly or Donatus, Bishop of Leighlin from c.1152 to 1181 and was finished by the end of the 13th century with the completion of the nave and choir. The two transepts, a tower, and a chapel attached to the choir were added in the 16th century, the latter two occurred in the time of Matthew Sanders, Bishop of Leghlin from 1529 to 1549. The south transept was later demolished, and the north transept left roofless. A pipe organ was installed under the tower in 1800 and later moved to an alcove. General restorations occurred in the 19th century, including a fine timber ceiling in the chancel, installed in 1890.

== Architecture ==
The Cathedral Church of St Laserian is one of Ireland's smallest cathedrals. Originally built in the 12th century, it has been heavily modified since then by the addition of a central tower in the late 15th century, a chapel north of the chancel and the partial rebuilding of the chancel walls. The cathedral has an 82-foot long nave, a 59-foot tall central tower, and a 59-foot long choir rebuilt in the mid-16th century.

The building is stylistically peculiar. Hardly any parts of the building are symmetrical with any other, down to the style of the windows. The nave's only window stands above the western door. The sedilia has four bays, the last a level above its fellows, and is flanked by a pair of trefoiled heads, dating from the late 13th century. The side-chapel's size is out of proportion with the rest of the cathedral. There is also evidence of haphazard additions: a 17th-century buttress blocks a 13th-century cancel window and there are blocked-up doors with no known purpose. Most puzzlingly, the cathedral has an underground passage, whose purpose and direction elicit only uncertain explanation.

The 11th century font, one of two in the cathedral, is probably the oldest item in the church.

== Burials ==
- St Laserian (died 639), medieval abbot of Old Leighlin monastery and first Bishop of Leighlin. Grave unknown.
- Thomas O'Fihelly (died 1567), Bishop of Leighlin (under the choir)
- Matthew Sanders (died 1549), Bishop of Leighlin (under the choir)

== See also ==
- Dean of Leighlin
