= Old Leighlin =

Village in County Carlow, Ireland

Coordinates: 52°44′11″N 7°1′10″W

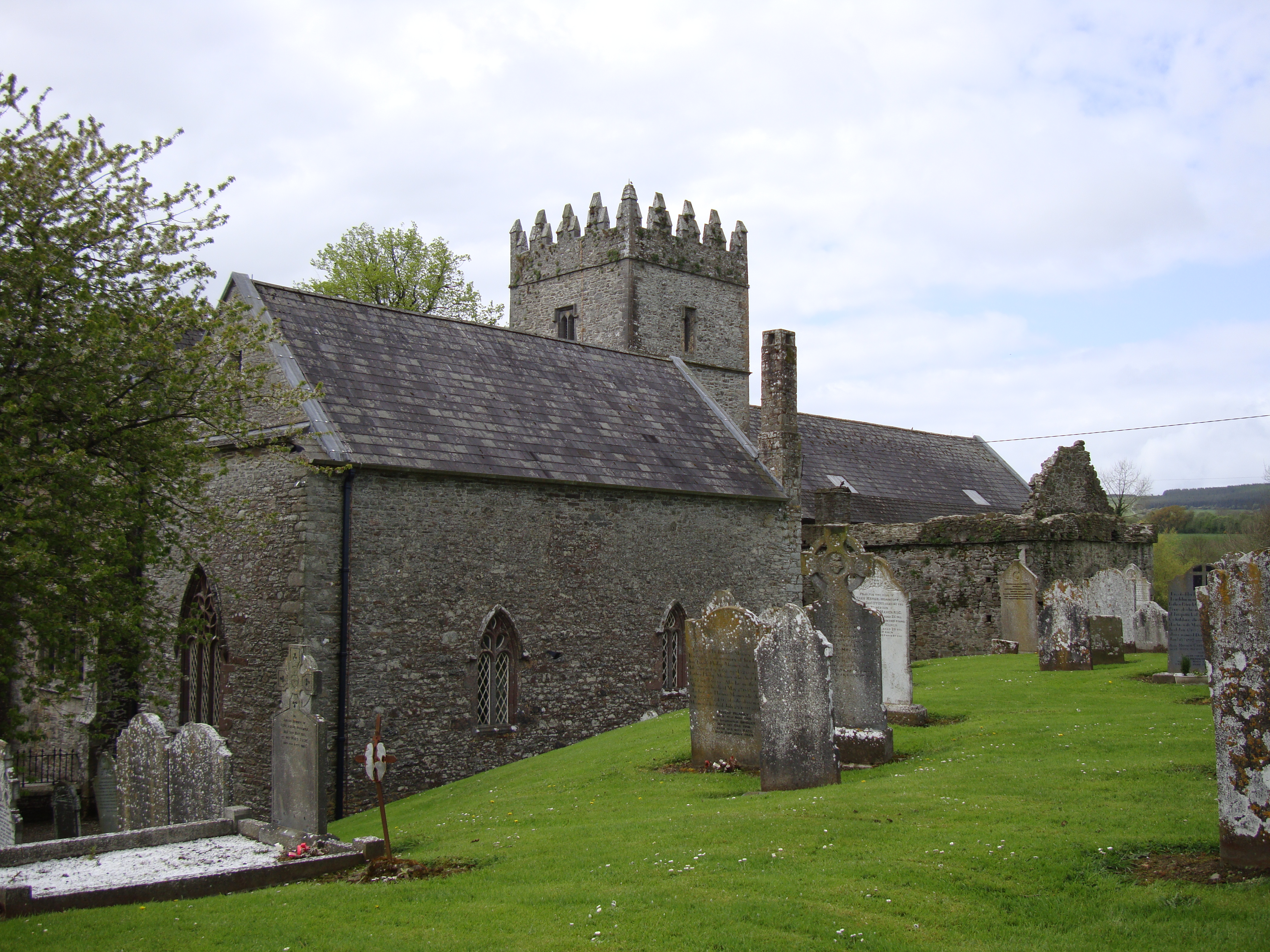
Old Leighlin Cathedral

Old Leighlin /ˈlɒklɪn/ (Irish: Seanleithghlinn), also Oldleighlin, is a village, civil parish and townland in County Carlow, Ireland. The village is 3.5 km (2 mi) west of Leighlinbridge. The site was at one time one of the foremost monastic houses in Leinster, with 1,500 monks in residence. It was the location for a church synod in AD 630, which decided that the Irish church should follow Roman as opposed to Celtic dating conventions for determining the date of Easter.

St Laserian's Cathedral was the cathedral of the diocese of Leighlin, now merged with neighbouring dioceses in the Church of Ireland. It is named after Molaise of Leighlin and was built on the site of an old monastic church founded here in 632 AD. It is one of the smallest Irish medieval cathedrals. Nearby are a holy well, which is still venerated, and small granite undecorated wheeled high cross with edge mouldings.

The parliamentary constituency of Old Leighlin in the pre-1800 Irish House of Commons was a bishop's borough where the Church of Ireland Bishop of Ferns and Leighlin controlled the selection of the two Members of Parliament.

== Notable people ==
- Nicholas Aylward Vigors FRS (1785–1840), zoologist and politician, born in Old Leighlin

== See also ==
- List of towns and villages in Ireland
- Old Leighlin – Seanleithghlinn :: Carlow Trails
