= Archdeacon of Lismore =

The Archdeacon of Lismore was a senior ecclesiastical officer within firstly the Diocese of Lismore until 1363; the Diocese of Waterford and Lismore from 1363 until 1838; and finally the Diocese of Cashel and Waterford, during which time it was combined with other Archdeaconries.

The archdeaconry can trace its history from Gilbert, the first known incumbent, who held the office in the first half of the thirteenth century to the last discrete incumbent Robert Scott Bradshaw Burkitt. As such he was responsible for the disciplinary supervision of the clergy and the upkeep of diocesan property within that diocese; and later, part of it.

== Archdeacons ==
- Gilbert (circa 1215)
- Andrew (1268)
- William le Fleming (1308; became Bishop of Lismore in 1309)
- Roger (1326)
- Maurice Fitzpiers (1364)
- John Le Reve (1384-6)
- Richard Cantwell (1426; later made Bishop of Waterford and Lismore the same year)
- Robert Le Poer (1434-1446; also Dean of Limerick)
- Purcell (1449)
- Donat Creagh (1588-circa 1591)
- William Carroll (sometime before 1615, by which time he had died)
- Richard Danyell (fl. 1607)
- John Alden (fl. 1612-1614)
- John Gore (1616-1638)
- Arthur Gwynn (1638-after 1642)
- Arthur Stanhope (1663-1684)
- Matthew Jones (1680s)
- Robert Stannard (1685-1686)
- John Eeles (1686-1722)
- William Dennis (1723-1749)
- John Jaumaud (1749-1751)
- Edward Thomas (1751-1753)
- Alexander Alcock (1753-1787)
- Thomas Smyth (1788-1810)
- Philip Ryan (1810-1828)
- Ambrose Power (1828-1869)
- John Ryland (1869-?)
- Latham Warren (?-1912)
- Robert Burkitt
