= Dean of Lismore =

Church of Ireland official

The Dean of Lismore is based at the Cathedral Church of St Carthage in Lismore in the united Diocese of Cashel and Ossory within the Church of Ireland.

The current incumbent is Paul Draper.

== List of deans of Lismore ==
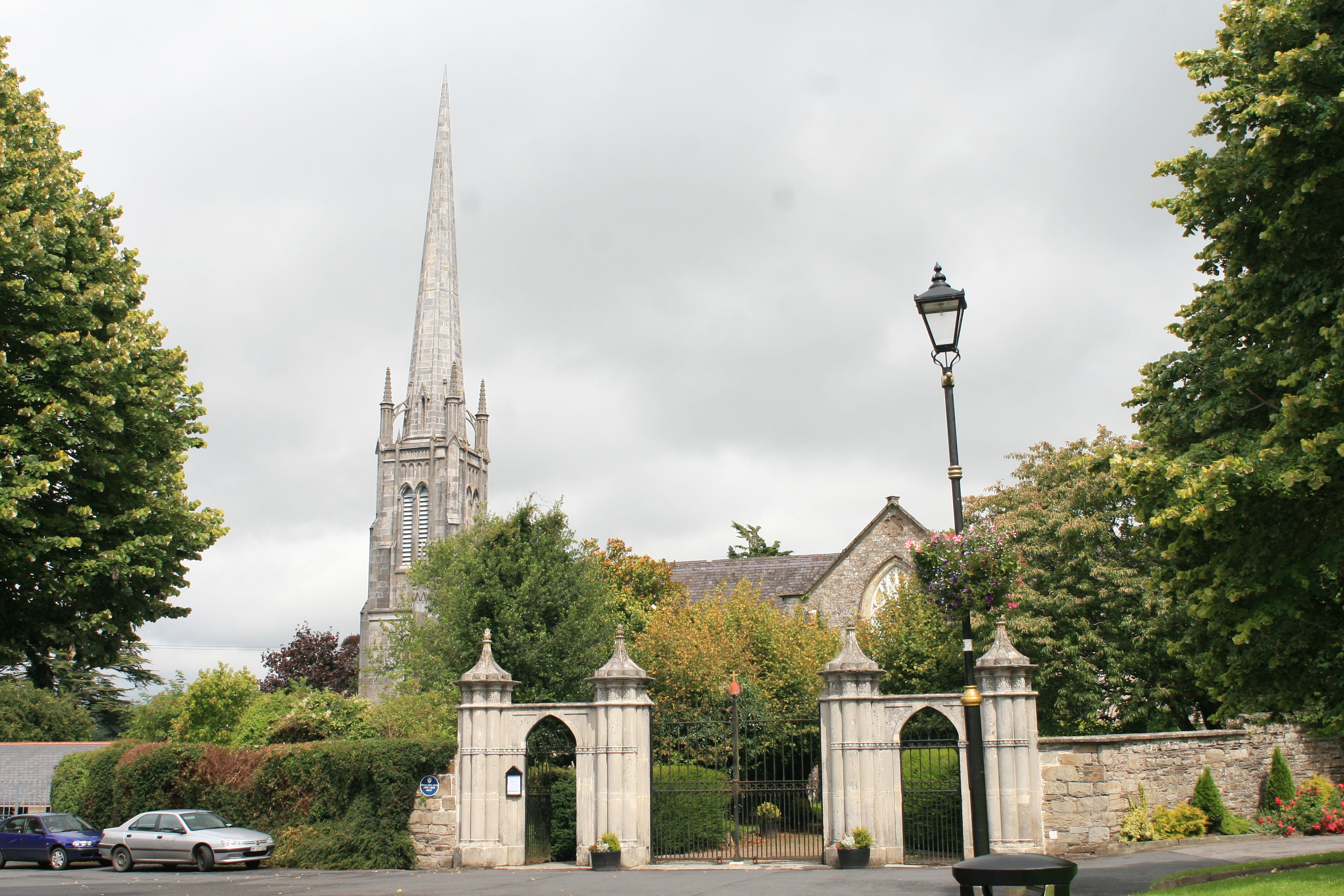
Lismore Cathedral

- ?–1549 James Butler
- 1564 Gerald FitzJames FitzGerald (deprived)
- 1583–1610 John Prendergast
- 1610-1614 Thomas Wilson
- 1614–1622 Michael Boyle (appointed Bishop of Waterford and Lismore 1619, but retained deanery in commendam until 1622)
- 1622–1622 Edward Brouncker
- 1622–1627/8 Robert Daborne
- 1628 John Greg
- 1630–1639/40 Robert Naylor (afterwards Dean of Limerick)
- 1640–1647 Edward Parry (afterwards Bishop of Killaloe 1647)
- 1647 Robert Parry
- 1661–1663 Richard Underwood
- 1664–1666 Hugh Gore (afterwards Bishop of Waterford and Lismore 1666)
- 1666–1670 Richard Lingard
- 1670–1678 Michael Ward (afterwards Bishop of Ossory 1678)
- 1678–1682 Edward Jones (afterwards Bishop of Cloyne 1682)
- 1683–1690 Barzillai Jones
- 1691–1719 William Jephson
- 1719–1720 Arthur Price (afterwards Dean of Ferns, 1720)
- 1720–1723 William Crosse (afterwards Dean of Leighlin, 1723)
- 1723–1724 John Francis
- 1724–1725 William Burscough (appointed Bishop of Limerick, Ardfert and Aghadoe 1725)
- 1725–1747 Alexander Alcock
- 1747–1762 Washington Cotes
- 1762–1791 John Ryder
- 1791–1796 John Whetham
- 1796–1828 John Scott
- 1828–1831 John Bayly
- 1831–1834 Sir George Bishopp, 9th Baronet
- 1834–1849 Henry Cotton
- 1850–1850 Thomas Townsend (afterwards Dean of Waterford 1850 and Bishop of Meath 1850)
- 1850-1884 Montague Browne
- 1884-1913 Henry Brougham
- 1913–1919 George Mayers (afterwards Dean of Waterford, 1919)
- 1919–1930 William Greene
- 1930–1934 John Leslie
- 1934–1961 Charles Stanley
- 1961–1987 Gilbert Mayes
- 1988-1990 Bill Bowder
- 1990–1996 Cecil Weekes
- 1996–1999 James Healey
- ?2003–2008 William Beare
- 2009–present Paul Draper
