= Adrian Wilkinson =

Irish Anglican priest: (born 1968)

Adrian Mark Wilkinson is an Irish Anglican bishop: he is the current Bishop of Cashel, Ferns and Ossory.

Wilkinson was born in 1968, educated at Trinity College Dublin, St. Patrick's College, Maynooth(NUI) training as a teacher and trained for ministry, at the Church of Ireland Theological College. He was ordained in 1994 He was curate at Douglas, County Cork from 1994 to 1997; the incumbent at Dunboyne from 1997 to 2002 and a Minor canon at St Patrick's Cathedral, Dublin from 1997 to 2002; and then back to Douglas. He was appointed as Archdeacon in 2014. He served as Chaplain at NUI Maynooth, where he completed an MA, he also completed, further study with the University of Wales.

He was elected bishop of Cashel, Ferns and Ossory on 23 June 2022. He had spent his childhood years in that diocese.
