= Bishop of Leighlin =

The Lord Bishop of Leighlin was a separate episcopal title which took its name after the small town of Old Leighlin in County Carlow, Ireland.

The title is now united with other bishoprics. In the Church of Ireland, it is held by the Lord Bishop of Cashel and Ossory, whose full title is the Lord Bishop of Cashel, Waterford, Lismore, Ossory, Ferns and Leighlin. In the Catholic Church, it is held by the Lord Bishop of Kildare and Leighlin.

== History ==
The diocese of Leighlin was one of the twenty-four dioceses established at the Synod of Rathbreasail in 1111. Following the Reformation, there are parallel apostolic successions. In the Church of Ireland, Leighlin was combined with Ferns in 1597 to form the united bishopric of Ferns and Leighlin. In the Roman Catholic Church, the see was governed by bishops or vicars apostolic, and from 1678 to 1694 it was administered by the Bishops of Kildare. The formal union of Kildare and Leighlin was decreed on 29 November 1694, thereby forming the united Diocese of Kildare and Leighlin.

== Pre-Reformation bishops ==
List of pre-Reformation Bishops of Leighlin
| From | Until | Incumbent | Notes |
|---|---|---|---|
| unknown | 1125 | ? Mael Eóin Ua Dúnacáin | Died in office |
| unknown | 1145 | Sluaigedach Ua Catháin | Died in office |
| bef.1152 | 1181 | Dúngal Ua Cáellaide | Present at the Synod of Kells in 1152; died in 1181; buried at St Laserian's Cathedral, Old Leighlin; also known as Dungall (or Donat) O'Kelly |
| fl.1192 | | Johannes | Known to be bishop around 1192 |
| 1198 | c.1201 | Johannes, O.Cist. | Formerly Abbot of Monasterevin; consecrated at Rome by Pope Innocent III on 18 September 1198; died circa 1201; also known as John |
| bef.1202 | 1217 | Herlewin, O.Cist. | Died before April 1217; buried at Dunbrody Abbey; also known as Hugh |
| c.1217 | 1228 | Richard Fleming | Consecrated circa 1217; died before November 1228; also known as Robert Fleming |
| 1228 | 1252 | William | Formerly Archdeacon of Leighlin; elected bishop before November 1228; died before 21 April 1252; buried at St Laserian's Cathedral, Old Leighlin |
| 1252 | 1275 | Thomas, O.S.A. | Elected before 4 September 1252; appointed 7 January 1253; received possession of the temporalities after 9 March 1253; died 25 April 1275 |
| 1275 | 1309 | Nicholas Cheever, O.F.M. | Formerly Archdeacon of Leighlin; elected bishop before November 1275; received possession of the temporalities 7 March 1276; confirmed 28 September 1276; died 20 July 1309; also knowns as Nicholas Cheevers |
| 1309 | 1320 | Maurice de Blanchville | Formerly Treasurer of Kilkenny; elected bishop in 1309; received possession of the temporalities after 13 November 1309; died before November 1320; also known as Maurice de Blanchfield |
| 1320 | 1348 | Meiler le Poer | Formerly Precentor of Leighlin; elected bishop 5 November 1320; received possession of the temporalities 11 February 1321; consecrated at Waterford 12 April 1321; died before November 1348 |
| 1344 | 1346 | Radulphus Ó Ceallaigh, O.Carm. | Appointed 6 February 1344 and consecrated later the same month, however, the appointment did not take effect; acted as a suffragan bishop in the Diocese of York in 1344; translated to Cashel 9 January 1346; his surname was possibly Ó Caollaidhe |
| 1348 | | William St Leger | Elected before 3 November 1348, but did not take effect |
| 1349 | 1360 | Thomas of Brakenberg, O.F.M. | Appointed 20 March and consecrated 30 March 1349; received possession of the temporalities 15 August 1349; died July 1360 |
| 1360 | 1361 | Johannes | Appointed 1360; died 1361 |
| 1362 | | William | Appointed 14 January 1362, but was not consecrated; died later in the same year |
| 1363 | 1385 | John Young | Formerly Treasurer of Leighlin; appointed 20 February 1363; received possession of the temporalities 21 September 1363; died circa 12 February 1385. Served as Deputy to the Lord Treasurer of Ireland |
| 1385 | 1399 | John Griffin | Formerly Chancellor of Limerick; received possession of the temporalities 2 August 1385; translated to Ossory 2 July 1399 |
| 1400 | 1419 | Richard Bocomb, O.P. | Appointed 1 October 1400; acted as a suffragan bishop in the dioceses of Exeter and Salisbury; resigned before July 1419 |
| 1419 | 1431 | Seaán Ó Maolagáin | Appointed 5 July 1419; received possession of the temporalities 1 September 1422; died 1431; buried at St Laserian's Cathedral, Old Leighlin; also known as John Mulgan or O'Mulligan |
| 1432 | 1458 | Thomas Fleming, O.F.M. | Appointed 29 April 1432; continued bishop until 1458 (or possibly longer); died at Old Leighlin and was buried in a monastery in Kilkenny |
| 1458 | 1464 | See vacant | |
| unknown | 1464 | Diarmaid | Died before February 1464 |
| 1464 | 1490 | Milo Roche, O.Cist. | Appointed 3 February 1464; died before April 1490; buried at St Laserian's Cathedral, Old Leighlin; also known as Milo de Rupe |
| 1490 | c.1512 | Nicholas Maguire | Appointed 21 April 1490; died circa 1512; also known as Nicholas 'Magwyr' |
| 1513 | c.1523 | Thomas Halsey | Appointed 20 May 1513; also was Prothonotary for Ireland and Penitentiary of all the English residents at Rome; attended the Fifth Council of the Lateran; acted as a suffragan bishop in the Diocese of York in 1519; died in Westminster circa 1523; buried at the Savoy Chapel, London; it is believed he never visited his diocese |
| 1524 | 1525 | Mauricius Ó Deóradháin, O.P. | Appointed 19 January 1524; he was murdered in 1525 by his archdeacon, Maurice Kavanagh (or Cavanagh); the bishop was also known as Maurice Doran or O'Deoran |
| 1525 | 1527 | See vacant | |
| 1527 | 1549 | Matthew Sanders | Appointed 10 April 1527; swore the Oath of Supremacy at Clonmel early in 1539; he was considered to be friendly to the doctrines of the Reformation; died 23 (or 24) December 1549; buried at St Laserian's Cathedral, Old Leighlin |
| 1541 | | (Thomas Leverous) | Appointed 14 November 1541 on the false new of the death of Sanders, but did not take effect; he later became Archdeacon of Armagh in 1554, and Bishop of Kildare and Dean of St. Patrick's Cathedral, Dublin in 1555 |

== Post-Reformation bishops ==
=== Church of Ireland succession ===
List of Church of Ireland Bishops of Leighlin
| From | Until | Incumbent | Notes |
|---|---|---|---|
| 1550 | 1554 | Robert Travers | Nominated 5 August 1550; deprived by Queen Mary I in 1554 on the grounds of him being a married man |
| 1555 | 1566/67 | Thomas O'Fihelly ^{[A]} | Translated from Achonry; appointed 30 August 1555; died 1566 or 1567 and buried at St Laserian's Cathedral, Old Leighlin |
| 1567 | 1587 | Daniel Cavanagh | Nominated 10 April and appointed by letters patent 7 May 1567; died 4 April 1587 and buried at St Laserian's Cathedral, Old Leighlin |
| 1587 | 1589 | See vacant | |
| 1589 | 1597 | Richard Meredith | Formerly Dean of St Patrick's, Dublin; nominated 11 January and consecrated in April 1589; died 3 August 1597 and buried in St Patrick's Cathedral, Dublin |
In 1597, the Church of Ireland see became part of the united bishopric of Ferns and Leighlin

=== Roman Catholic succession ===
List of Roman Catholic Bishops of Leighlin
| From | Until | Incumbent | Notes |
|---|---|---|---|
| 1549 | 1555 | See vacant | |
| 1555 | 1566/67 | Thomas O'Fihelly ^{[B]} | Translated from Achonry; appointed 30 August 1555; died 1566 or 1567 |
| 1566/67 | 1587 | See vacant | |
| 1587 | 1604 | Francisco de Ribera | Appointed 14 September 1587; he never came to Ireland; died 10 September 1604 |
| 1604 | 1609 | See vacant | |
| 1609 | unknown | Luke Archer, O.Cist. | Appointed vicar apostolic by papal brief 19 January 1609 |
| 1622 | unknown | Matthew Roche | Appointed vicar apostolic by papal brief 15 January 1622 |
| 1642 | 1661 | Edmund Dempsey, O.P. | Appointed 10 March 1642; died circa 1661 |
| c.1661 | 1678 | See vacant | |
| 1678 | 1694 | Administered by the Bishops of Kildare | |
In 1694, the Roman Catholic see became part of the united Diocese of Kildare and Leighlin.

== Notes ==
- ^{A} ^{B} Thomas O'Fihelly was bishop of both successions.
