= Lismore Cathedral, Ireland =

St. Carthage's Cathedral, Lismore
- The Cathedral Church of St Carthage, Lismore
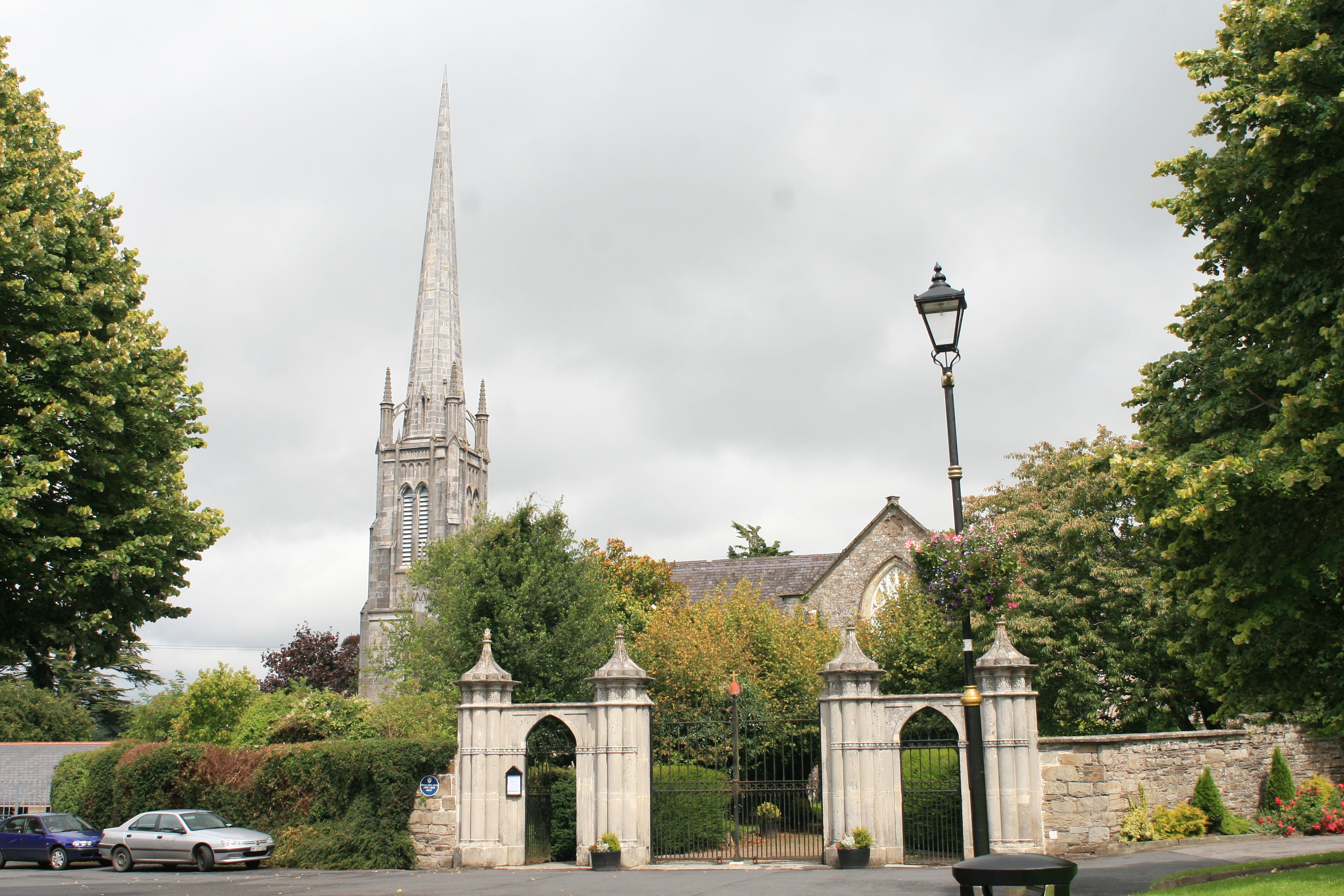
- St. Carthage's Cathedral, Lismore
- 52°08′23″N 07°55′45″W
- Country: Ireland
- Denomination: Church of Ireland
- Website: https://www.stcarthagescathedral.ie/

History
- Dedication: St. Carthage

Architecture
- Architect: William Robinson
- Groundbreaking: 1663
- Completed: 1679

Administration
- Province: Province of Dublin
- Diocese: Diocese of Cashel and Ossory

Clergy
- Bishop: The Right Reverend Adrian Wilkinson
- Dean: The Very Revd Paul Draper

St. Carthage's Cathedral, Lismore is a Church of Ireland cathedral in Lismore, County Waterford. It is in the ecclesiastical province of Dublin. Formerly the cathedral of the Diocese of Lismore, it is now one of six cathedrals in the United Dioceses of Cashel and Ossory.

== History ==
The medieval cathedral was in ruins after a fire in the 17th century. The choir was reroofed by Richard Boyle, 1st Earl of Cork. The cathedral was again destroyed in 1630, and rebuilt starting in 1663 with input from architect William Robinson. It was re-roofed and refurbished in the 18th century. All the various rebuilding and reconstruction works have involved input from such architects as Sir William Robinson, Sir Richard Morrison, and George and James Pain.

Lord Charles Cavendish was buried at Lismore Cathedral in 1944.

== Gallery ==
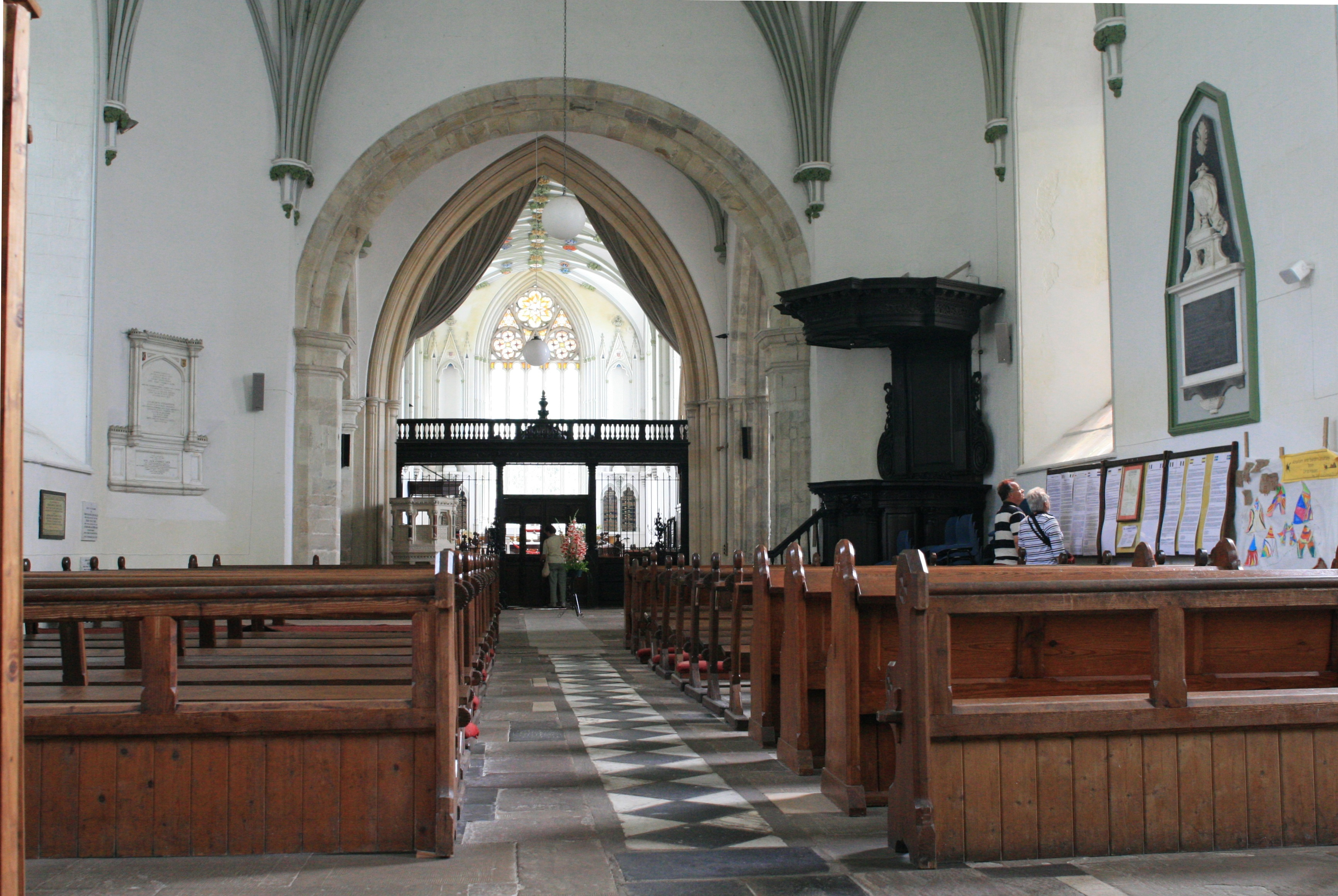
Cathedral nave and choir

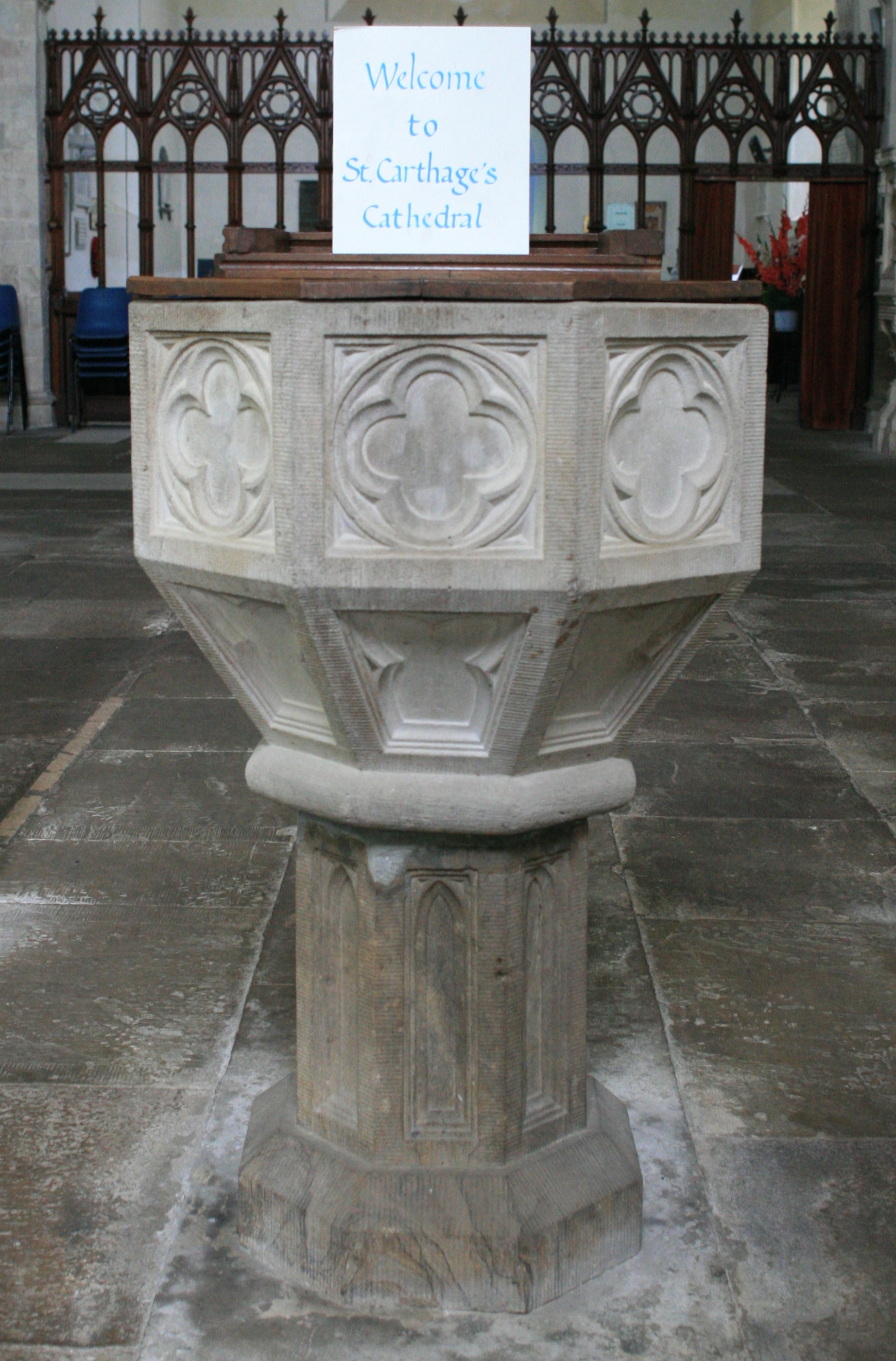
Cathedral font

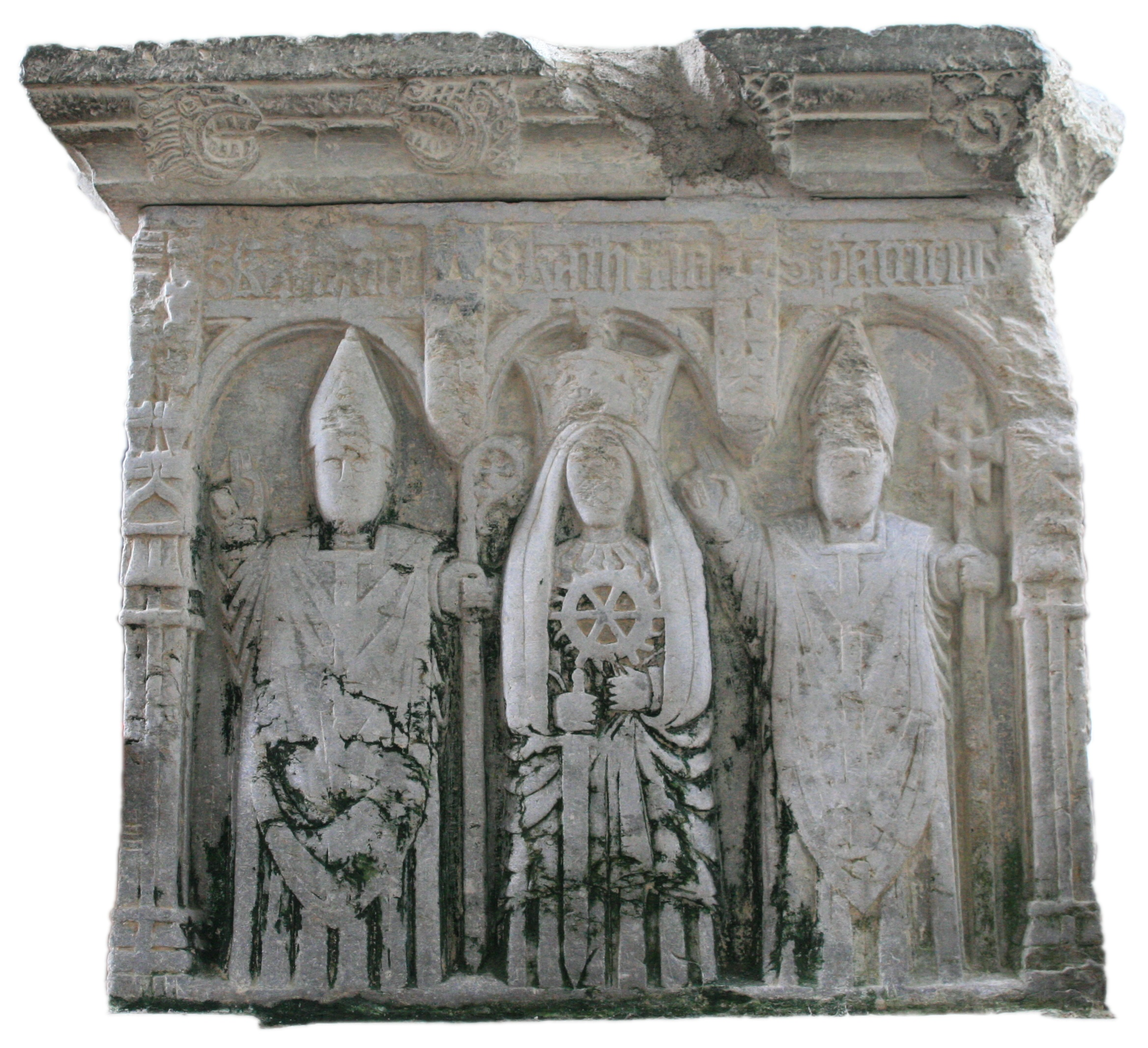
Altar tomb

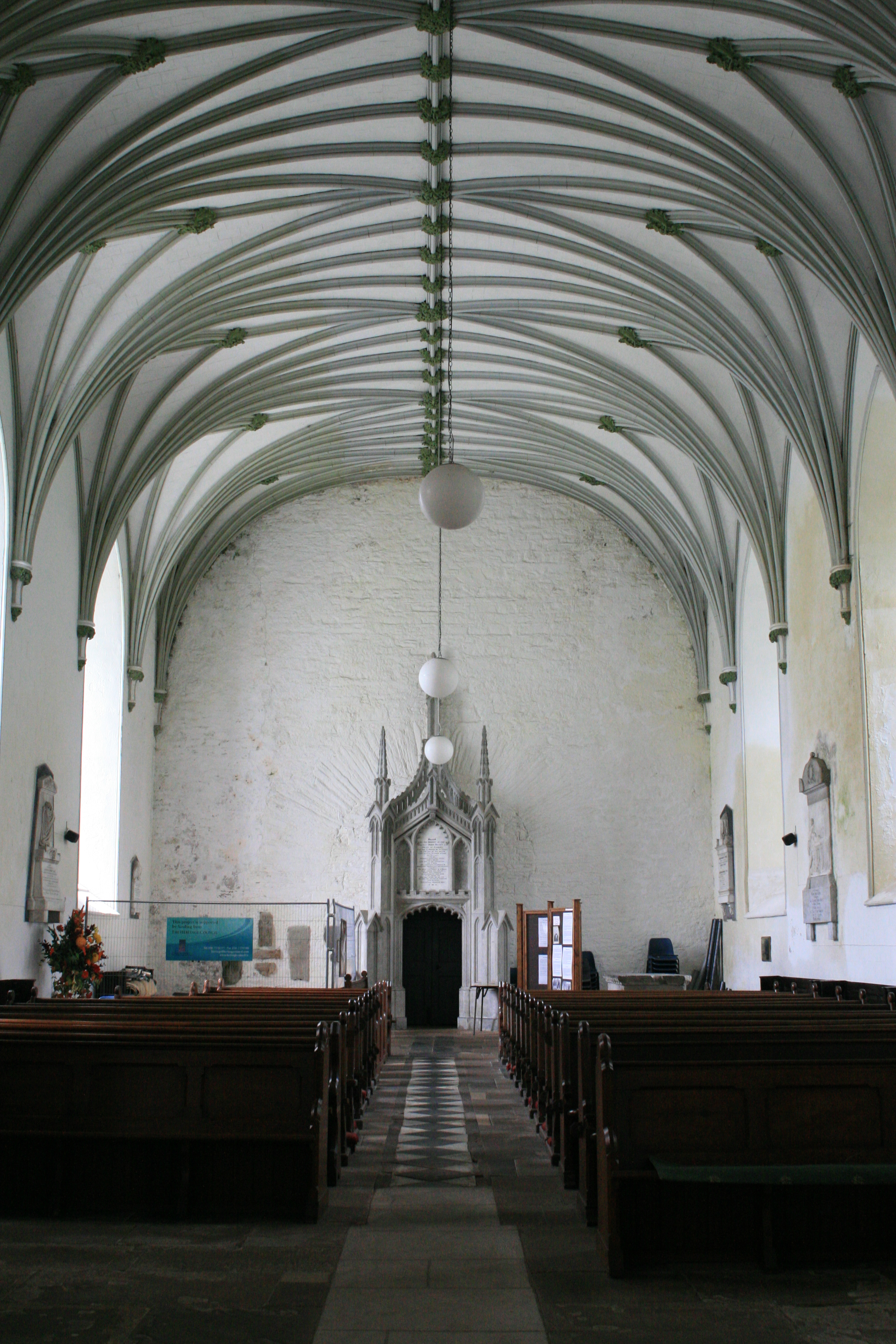
Nave of the cathedral

== See also ==
- Dean of Lismore
