= Christ Church Cathedral, Waterford =

Protestant cathedral in Waterford, Ireland

- Ardeaglais na Tríonóide Naofa, Ardteampall Chríost
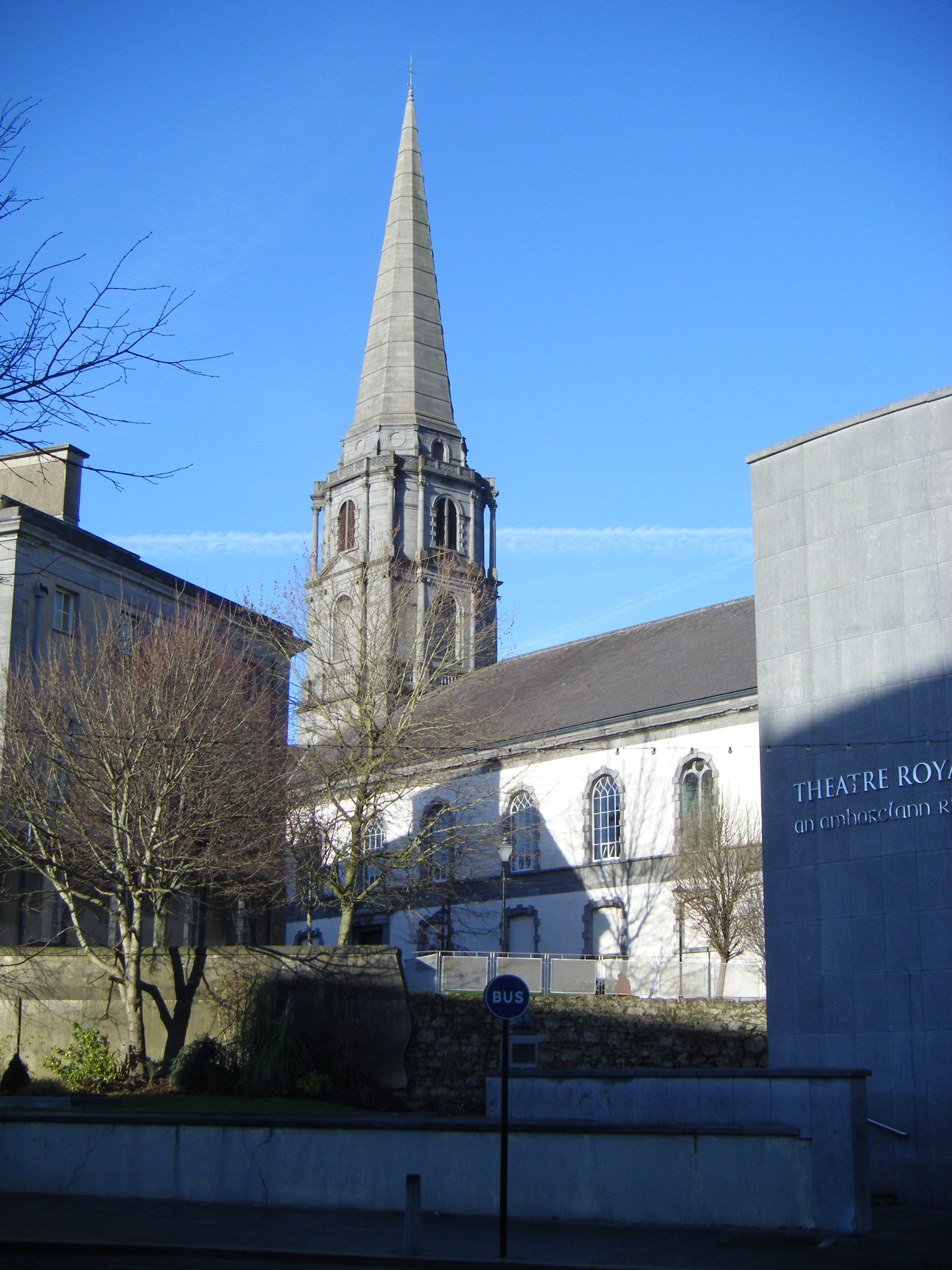
- Christ Church Cathedral, Waterford
- 52°15′36″N 7°06′27″W
- Country: Ireland
- Denomination: Church of Ireland
- Website: www.christchurchwaterford.com

History
- Dedication: Holy Trinity

Architecture
- Architect: John Roberts
- Style: Georgian
- Groundbreaking: 1774
- Completed: 1792

Administration
- Province: Province of Dublin
- Diocese: Diocese of Cashel and Ossory

Clergy
- Bishop: Bishop of Cashel and Ossory
- Dean: The Very Revd Bruce Hayes

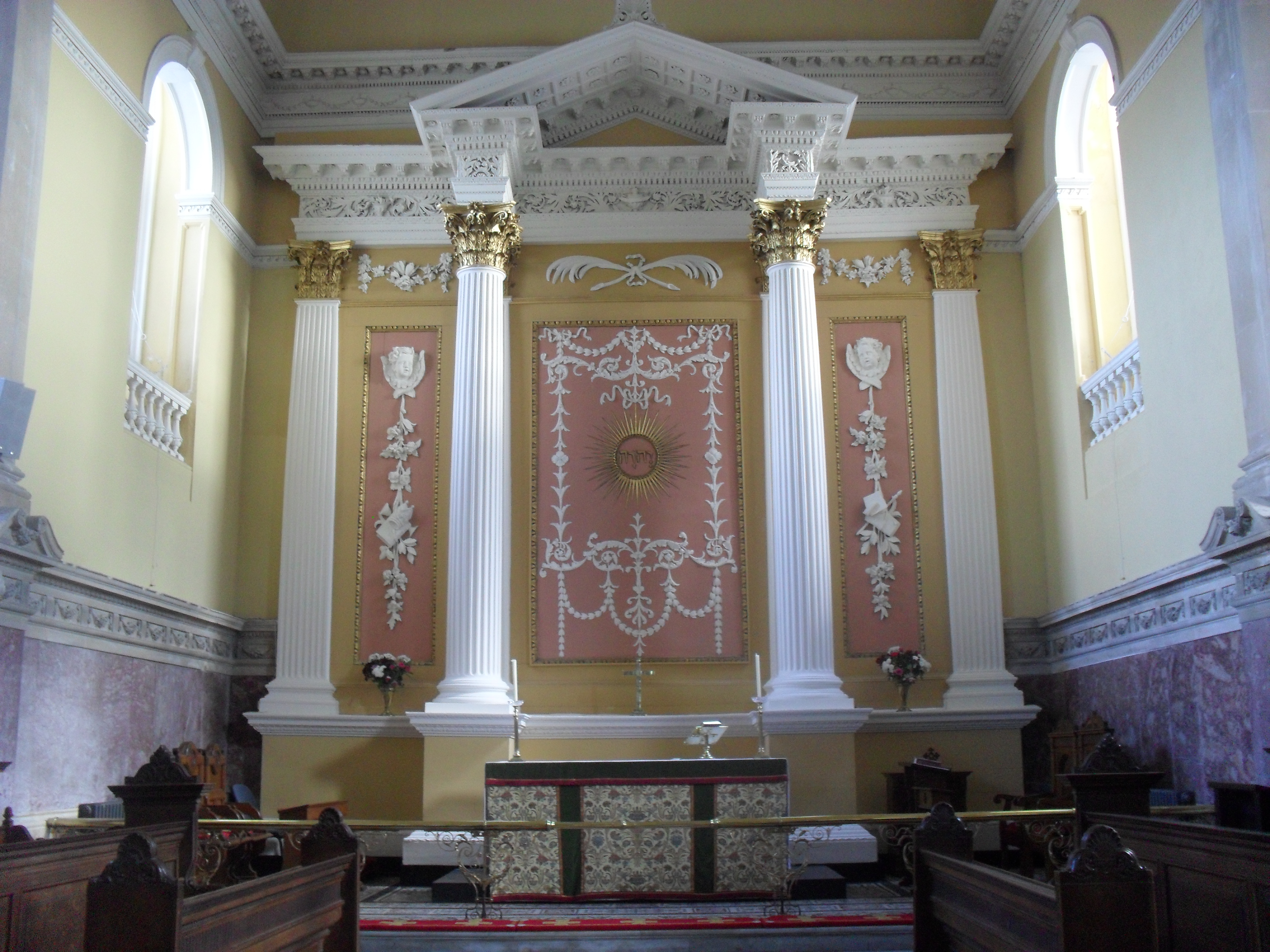
The altar, with the Tetragrammaton above.

Christ Church Cathedral, Waterford, or more formally, the Cathedral of The Holy Trinity, Christ Church, is a cathedral of the Church of Ireland in Waterford City, Ireland. It is in the ecclesiastical province of Dublin. Previously the cathedral of the Diocese of Waterford, it is now one of six cathedrals in the United Dioceses of Cashel and Ossory.

== Ecclesiastical history ==
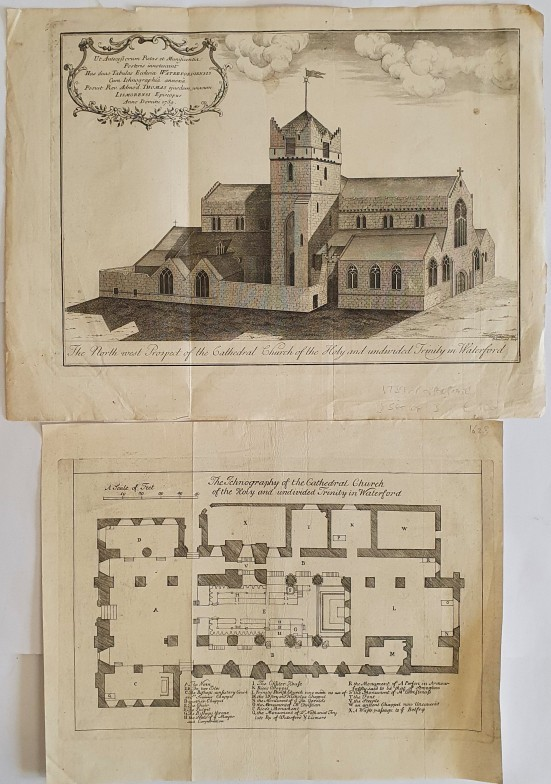
Illustration of the north and west prospect of the cathedral by Jonas Blaymire in 1739.

The first church on the site was built in the 11th century. In 1170 it was the venue for the marriage of Richard de Clare, 2nd Earl of Pembroke ("Strongbow"), and Aoife Ní Diarmait.

=== Gothic church ===
This church was replaced in 1210 by a Gothic Cathedral. Since Christ Church Cathedral was subject to the Protestant Reformation, Roman Catholic adherents were consequently obliged to worship elsewhere. This church was demolished in 1773.

=== Georgian church ===
In the 18th century, the city corporation recommended that the bishop erect a new building. William Halfpenny first made drawings of a palladian vernacular replacement in 1739 around the same time as Jonas Blaymire was also carrying out drawings and plans of the medieval cathedral.

The new design chosen was by the local architect John Roberts in 1774, who was also responsible for the Catholic cathedral and for much of Georgian Waterford including the adjacent Bishop's Palace which was completed from 1775. The steeple wasn't raised until 1783 and the building not finished finally until at least 1792.

During the demolition of the old cathedral, a series of medieval vestments were discovered in 1773. They were presented by the then Anglican bishop, the Rt Revd Richard Chenevix, to his Roman Catholic counterpart, the Most Revd Peter Creagh, and are now kept in the Museum of Treasures in Waterford and the National Museum in Dublin.

The present building has been described by architectural historian Mark Girouard as the finest 18th century ecclesiastical building in Ireland.

== Burials and mounments ==
- Michael Boyle (the elder), Bishop of Waterford and Lismore (1619–1635)
- Monument by John van Nost the younger to Susanna Mason (died 1752)
- Monument by John van Nost the younger to Nicholas and John Fitzgerald (1770)

== See also ==
- Bishop of Waterford
- Bishop of Waterford and Lismore
- Bishop of Cashel and Waterford
- Bishop of Cashel and Ossory
- Dean of Waterford
