= Ballynamuck =

Ballynamuck or Ballinamuck may refer to several places in Ireland:

- Ballynamuck, County Cork, a townland; see List of townlands of the barony of Orrery and Kilmore
- Ballinamuck, County Longford, a village
- Ballynamuck East, County Waterford, a townland; see List of townlands of County Waterford
- Ballynamuck Middle, County Waterford, a townland; see List of townlands of County Waterford
- Ballynamuck West, County Waterford, a townland; see List of townlands of County Waterford
