= List of townlands of County Waterford =

This is a sortable table of the approximately 1,658 townlands in County Waterford, Ireland.

Duplicate names occur where there is more than one townland with the same name in the county. Names marked in bold typeface are towns and villages, and the word Town appears for those entries in the Acres column.

== Townland list ==
Townland	Acres	Barony	Civil parish	Poor law union
Abartagh	34	Decies within Drum	Clashmore	Youghal
Abbeylands	234	Gaultiere	Kilculliheen	Waterford
Abbeyside	177	Decies without Drum	Dungarvan	Dungarvan
Acres	7	Decies without Drum	Dungarvan	Dungarvan
Adamstown	247	Middlethird	Kilmeadan	Waterford
Adamstown	69	Middlethird	Lisnakill	Waterford
Addrigoole	102	Decies within Drum	Lisgenan or Grange	Youghal
Adramone Beg	92	Decies without Drum	Kilrossanty	Kilmacthomas
Adramone more	118	Decies without Drum	Kilrossanty	Kilmacthomas
Affane	166	Decies without Drum	Affane	Lismore
Affane Hunter	200	Decies without Drum	Affane	Lismore
**Aglish**	Town	Decies within Drum	Aglish	Dungarvan
Aglish	307	Coshmore & Coshbride	Lismore & Mocollop	Lismore
Aglish	302	Decies within Drum	Aglish	Dungarvan
Ahanaglogh	258	Decies without Drum	Ballylaneen	Kilmacthomas
Ahaun	128	Decies within Drum	Ardmore	Dungarvan
Ahaun	99	Coshmore and Coshbride	Lismore & Mocollop	Lismore
Ahaunboy North	201	Coshmore and Coshbride	Lismore & Mocollop	Lismore
Ahaunboy South	117	Coshmore and Coshbride	Lismore & Mocollop	Lismore
Amberhill	448	Middlethird	Kilmeadan	Waterford
**Annestown**	Town	Middlethird	Dunhill	Kilmacthomas
Annestown	120	Middlethird	Dunhill	Kilmacthomas
Ardeenloun East	295	Middlethird	Newcastle	Waterford
Ardeenloun West	210	Middlethird	Newcastle	Waterford
**Ardmore**	Town	Decies within Drum	Ardmore	Youghal
Ardmore (or Windgap)	76	Upperthird	Dysert	Carrick on Suir
Ardnahow	205	Middlethird	Reisk	Waterford
Ardocheasty	172	Decies within Drum	Ardmore	Youghal
Ardoginna	425	Decies within Drum	Ardmore	Youghal
Ardpaddin	167	Glenahiry	Kilronan	Clonmel
Ardsallagh	528	Decies within Drum	Clashmore	Youghal
Ashtown	1,066	Decies without Drum	Fews	Kilmacthomas
Aughmore	200	Upperthird	Rathgormuck	Carrick on Suir
Aughnacurraveel	287	Decies within Drum	Clashmore	Youghal
Auskurra Big	39	Gaultiere	Killea	Waterford
Auskurra Little	9	Gaultiere	Killea	Waterford
Ballaghavorraga	201	Decies without Drum	Clonea	Dungarvan
Balleighteragh East	139	Decies without Drum	Kilgobnet	Dungarvan
Balleighteragh West	69	Decies without Drum	Kilgobnet	Dungarvan
Ballinab	253	Upperthird	Mothel	Carrick on Suir
Ballinaha	118	Coshmore and Coshbride	Tallow	Lismore
Ballinaleucra	111	Coshmore and Coshbride	Lismore & Mocollop	Lismore
Ballinamona	348	Gaultiere	Kilbarry	Waterford
Ballinanchor	118	Coshmore and Coshbride	Lismore & Mocollop	Lismore
Ballinaspick North	480	Coshmore and Coshbride	Lismore & Mocollop	Lismore
Ballinaspick South	359	Coshmore and Coshbride	Lismore & Mocollop	Lismore
Ballinattin	297	Middlethird	Drumcannon	Waterford
Ballindrumma	241	Decies within Drum	Clashmore	Youghal
Ballindud	400	Gaultiere	Kilbarry	Waterford
Ballindysert	945	Upperthird	Dysert	Carrick on Suir
Ballingarra	300	Upperthird	Rathgormuck	Carrick on Suir
Ballingarry	200	Decies without Drum	Kilbarrymeaden	Kilmacthomas
Ballingowan	290	Decies without Drum	Kilrossanty	Kilmacthomas
Ballingowan East	418	Decies within Drum	Aglish	Dungarvan
Ballingowan West	216	Decies within Drum	Aglish	Dungarvan
Ballinkina	302	Gaultiere	Kilmacomb	Waterford
Ballinlevane East	170	Coshmore and Coshbride	Lismore & Mocollop	Lismore
Ballinlevane West	286	Coshmore and Coshbride	Lismore & Mocollop	Lismore
Ballinlough	284	Decies without Drum	Kilbarrymeaden	Kilmacthomas
Ballinroad	202	Decies within Drum	Ardmore	Dungarvan
Ballinroad	66	Decies without Drum	Dungarvan	Dungarvan
Ballintaylor Lower	503	Decies without Drum	Whitechurch	Dungarvan
Ballintaylor Upper	82	Decies without Drum	Whitechurch	Dungarvan
Ballintlea	473	Decies without Drum	Kilrossanty	Kilmacthomas
Ballintlea North	176	Decies within Drum	Ardmore	Dungarvan
Ballintlea South	114	Decies within Drum	Ardmore	Dungarvan
Ballintoor	169	Decies without Drum	Kilgobnet	Dungarvan
Ballinure	79	Decies within Drum	Clashmore	Youghal
Ballinure	58	Decies without Drum	Dungarvan	Dungarvan
Ballinvella	251	Gaultiere	Kilmacleague	Waterford
Ballinvella	223	Coshmore and Coshbride	Lismore & Mocollop	Lismore
Ballinvoher	112	Gaultiere	Kilculliheen	Waterford
Ballinwillin	145	Coshmore and Coshbride	Lismore & Mocollop	Lismore
Ballyadam	229	Middlethird	Reisk	Waterford
Ballyard	84	Decies without Drum	Whitechurch	Lismore
Ballybeg	267	Gaultiere	Kilbarry	Waterford
Ballyboy	707	Decies without Drum	Fews	Kilmacthomas
Ballybrack	735	Decies without Drum	Rossmire	Kilmacthomas
Ballybrack	179	Coshmore & Coshbride	Kilcockan	Lismore
Ballybregin	149	Middlethird	Dunhill	Kilmacthomas
Ballybrennock	353	Middlethird	Reisk	Waterford
Ballybrusa (or Brucetown)	104	Decies within Drum	Lisgenan or Grange	Youghal
Ballybrusa East	128	Decies within Drum	Lisgenan or Grange	Youghal
Ballybrusa West	227	Decies within Drum	Lisgenan or Grange	Youghal
Ballycahane	836	Upperthird	Guilcagh	Carrick on Suir
Ballycanvan Big	366	Gaultiere	Kill St. Nicholas	Waterford
Ballycanvan Little	3	Gaultiere	Kill St. Nicholas	Waterford
Ballycarnane	225	Middlethird	Drumcannon	Waterford
Ballycashin	609	Middlethird	Kilburne	Waterford
Ballyclement	89	Coshmore & Coshbride	Kilwatermoy	Lismore
Ballyclohy	456	Upperthird	Dysert	Carrick on Suir
Ballycoardra	89	Gaultiere	Drumcannon	Waterford
Ballycoe	155	Decies without Drum	Dungarvan	Dungarvan
Ballycondon	213	Coshmore and Coshbride	Templemichael	Youghal
Ballycondon Commons	554	Coshmore and Coshbride	Templemichael	Youghal
Ballyconnery Lower	156	Decies without Drum	Kilgobnet	Dungarvan
Ballyconnery Upper	224	Decies without Drum	Kilgobnet	Dungarvan
**Ballycourdra**	Town	Gaultiere	St. John's Without	Waterford
Ballycourdra	14	Gaultiere	St. John's Without	Waterford
Ballycraddock	349	Middlethird	Dunhill	Waterford
Ballycrompane	182	Decies within Drum	Clashmore	Youghal
Ballycullane	263	Decies within Drum	Aglish	Dungarvan
Ballycullane	178	Upperthird	Rathgormuck	Carrick on Suir
Ballycullane Beg	200	Decies without Drum	Dungarvan	Dungarvan
Ballycullane More	285	Decies without Drum	Dungarvan	Dungarvan
Ballycurrane	223	Decies within Drum	Ardmore	Youghal
Ballycurrane North	162	Decies within Drum	Clashmore	Youghal
Ballycurrane South	232	Decies within Drum	Clashmore	Youghal
Ballycurreen North	335	Decies within Drum	Ballymacart	Dungarvan
Ballycurreen South	318	Decies within Drum	Ballymacart	Dungarvan
Ballydasoon	130	Coshmore and Coshbride	Templemichael	Youghal
Ballydavid	227	Gaultiere	Crooke	Waterford
Ballydermody	313	Middlethird	Reisk	Waterford
Ballydermodybog	112	Middlethird	Reisk	Waterford
Ballydonagh	462	Glenahiry	Kilronan	Clonmel
Ballydowane East	188	Decies without Drum	Ballylaneen	Kilmacthomas
Ballydowane West	197	Decies without Drum	Ballylaneen	Kilmacthomas
Ballydrishane	272	Middlethird	Drumcannon	Waterford
**Ballyduff**	Town	Coshmore and Coshbride	Lismore & Mocollop	Lismore
Ballyduff	196	Decies without Drum	Dungarvan	Dungarvan
Ballyduff	133	Coshmore and Coshbride	Lismore & Mocollop	Lismore
Ballyduff Beg	100	Decies without Drum	Dungarvan	Dungarvan
Ballyduff East	527	Middlethird	Kilmeadan	Waterford
Ballyduff Lower	322	Coshmore and Coshbride	Lismore & Mocollop	Lismore
Ballyduff More	246	Decies without Drum	Dungarvan	Dungarvan
Ballyduff Upper	297	Coshmore and Coshbride	Lismore & Mocollop	Lismore
Ballyduff West	343	Middlethird	Kilmeadan	Waterford
Ballydurn	1,149	Upperthird	Mothel	Carrick on Suir
Ballyea East	135	Coshmore and Coshbride	Lismore & Mocollop	Lismore
Ballyea West	131	Coshmore and Coshbride	Lismore & Mocollop	Lismore
Ballyeafy	478	Coshmore and Coshbride	Lismore & Mocollop	Lismore
Ballyeelinan	265	Decies within Drum	Lisgenan or Grange	Youghal
Ballygagin (Crawford)	178	Decies without Drum	Kilrush	Dungarvan
Ballygagin (Garde)	151	Decies without Drum	Kilrush	Dungarvan
Ballygalane	106	Coshmore and Coshbride	Lismore & Mocollop	Lismore
Ballygalane Upper	136	Coshmore and Coshbride	Lismore & Mocollop	Lismore
Ballygally	149	Coshmore and Coshbride	Lismore & Mocollop	Lismore
Ballygally East	167	Coshmore and Coshbride	Lismore & Mocollop	Lismore
Ballygally West	96	Coshmore and Coshbride	Lismore & Mocollop	Lismore
Ballygambon Lower	212	Decies without Drum	Whitechurch	Dungarvan
Ballygambon Upper	284	Decies without Drum	Whitechurch	Dungarvan
Ballygarran	412	Gaultiere	Kilmacleague	Waterford
Ballygarran	410	Middlethird	Newcastle	Waterford
Ballygarran	237	Decies without Drum	Ballylaneen	Kilmacthomas
Ballygarran	224	Middlethird	Islandikane	Waterford
Ballygarret	133	Upperthird	Mothel	Carrick on Suir
Ballyglan	381	Gaultiere	Kill St. Nicholas	Waterford
Ballyguiry	261	Decies within Drum	Ardmore	Dungarvan
Ballyguiry East	109	Decies within Drum	Dungarvan	Dungarvan
Ballyguiry West	316	Decies within Drum	Dungarvan	Dungarvan
Ballygunnercastle	282	Gaultiere	Ballygunner	Waterford
Ballygunnermore	654	Gaultiere	Ballygunner	Waterford
Ballygunnertemple	278	Gaultiere	Ballygunner	Waterford
Ballyhamlet	247	Coshmore and Coshbride	Kilwatermoy	Lismore
Ballyhander	149	Coshmore and Coshbride	Tallow	Lismore
Ballyhane	407	Decies without Drum	Affane	Lismore
Ballyhane	133	Decies without Drum	Whitechurch	Lismore
Ballyharrahan	309	Decies within Drum	Ringagonagh	Dungarvan
Ballyheadon	212	Middlethird	Dunhill	Kilmacthomas
Ballyheeny	381	Decies within Drum	Clashmore	Youghal
Ballyheeny	278	Decies within Drum	Kinsalebeg	Youghal
Ballyhest	135	Upperthird	Mothel	Carrick on Suir
Ballyhoo	300	Gaultiere	Kilbarry	Waterford
Ballyhussa	616	Decies without Drum	Rossmire	Kilmacthomas
Ballyin Lower	305	Coshmore and Coshbride	Lismore & Mocollop	Lismore
Ballyin Upper	159	Coshmore and Coshbride	Lismore & Mocollop	Lismore
Ballykennedy	60	Decies without Drum	Whitechurch	Dungarvan
Ballykerin Lower	125	Decies without Drum	Modelligo	Dungarvan
Ballykerin Middle	183	Decies without Drum	Modelligo	Dungarvan
Ballykerin Upper	235	Decies without Drum	Modelligo	Dungarvan
Ballykeroge Big	447	Decies without Drum	Kilrossanty	Kilmacthomas
Ballykeroge Little	158	Decies without Drum	Kilrossanty	Kilmacthomas
Ballykilmurry	205	Decies without Drum	Kilrossanty	Kilmacthomas
Ballykilmurry	113	Decies within Drum	Ardmore	Dungarvan
Ballykilmurry	59	Decies within Drum	Lisgenan or Grange	Youghal
Ballykinsella	408	Middlethird	Drumcannon	Waterford
Ballyknock	467	Upperthird	Mothel	Carrick on Suir
Ballyknock	322	Middlethird	Drumcannon	Waterford
Ballyknock	163	Coshmore and Coshbride	Templemichael	Youghal
Ballyknock Lower	256	Decies without Drum	Kilgobnet	Dungarvan
Ballyknock Upper	430	Decies without Drum	Kilgobnet	Dungarvan
Ballylane	237	Decies within Drum	Lisgenan or Grange	Youghal
**Ballylaneen**	Town	Decies without Drum	Ballylaneen	Kilmacthomas
Ballylaneen	433	Decies without Drum	Ballylaneen	Kilmacthomas
Ballylangadon	318	Decies within Drum	Lisgenan or Grange	Youghal
Ballyleen	481	Middlethird	Dunhill	Kilmacthomas
Ballylegat	166	Middlethird	Reisk	Waterford
Ballylemon	118	Decies without Drum	Whitechurch	Dungarvan
Ballylemon Lower	102	Decies without Drum	Whitechurch	Dungarvan
Ballylemon Upper	97	Decies without Drum	Whitechurch	Dungarvan
Ballylemonwood	116	Decies without Drum	Whitechurch	Dungarvan
Ballylehane	256	Middlethird	Dunhill	Kilmacthomas
Ballylinch	395	Decies without Drum	Stradbally	Kilmacthomas
Ballyloughbeg	337	Gaultiere	Kilmacleague	Waterford
Ballyloughmore	279	Gaultiere	Kilmacomb	Waterford
Ballymabin	291	Gaultiere	Killea	Waterford
Ballymacarbry	865	Glenahiry	Kilronan	Clonmel
Ballymacart Lower	228	Decies within Drum	Ballymacart	Dungarvan
Ballymacart Upper	591	Decies within Drum	Ballymacart	Dungarvan
Ballymacaw	539	Gaultiere	Rathmoylan	Waterford
Ballymaclode	374	Gaultiere	Ballygunner	Waterford
Ballymacmague East	177	Decies without Drum	Dungarvan	Dungarvan
Ballymacmague North	252	Decies without Drum	Dungarvan	Dungarvan
Ballymacmague South	315	Decies without Drum	Dungarvan	Dungarvan
Ballymacmague West	194	Decies without Drum	Dungarvan	Dungarvan
Ballymakee	357	Glenahiry	Kilronan	Clonmel
Ballymartin North	237	Coshmore & Coshbride	Lismore & Mocollop	Lismore
Ballymartin South	180	Coshmore & Coshbride	Lismore & Mocollop	Lismore
Ballymoat	279	Middlethird	Reisk	Waterford
Ballymoat Lower	184	Coshmore & Coshbride	Kilwatermoy	Lismore
Ballymoat Upper	165	Coshmore & Coshbride	Kilwatermoy	Lismore
Ballymoodranagh	146	Coshmore and Coshbride	Lismore & Mocollop	Lismore
Ballymorris	196	Middlethird	Reisk	Waterford
Ballymuddy	148	Coshmore & Coshbride	Kilwatermoy	Lismore
Ballymulalla East	198	Decies without Drum	Whitechurch	Dungarvan
Ballymulalla West	200	Decies without Drum	Whitechurch	Dungarvan
Ballymurrin	236	Decies without Drum	Kilbarrymeaden	Kilmacthomas
Ballynabanoge North	240	Decies without Drum	Ballylaneen	Kilmacthomas
Ballynabanoge Souoht	404	Decies without Drum	Ballylaneen	Kilmacthomas
Ballynabola	236	Gaultiere	Kill St. Nicholas	Waterford
Ballynaclash	283	Decies within Drum	Clashmore	Youghal
Ballynaclogh North	305	Middlethird	Reisk	Waterford
Ballynaclogh South	314	Middlethird	Reisk	Waterford
Ballynacourty	359	Decies without Drum	Dungarvan	Dungarvan
Ballynacourty	242	Decies without Drum	Whitechurch	Dungarvan
Ballynacourty	154	Decies within Drum	Aglish	Dungarvan
Ballynacourty North	69	Decies within Drum	Ringagonagh	Dungarvan
Ballynacourty South	194	Decies within Drum	Ringagonagh	Dungarvan
Ballynacurra	536	Upperthird	Mothel	Carrick on Suir
Ballynadeige	81	Coshmore and Coshbride	Lismore & Mocollop	Lismore
Ballynafina	257	Upperthird	Rathgormuck	Carrick on Suir
Ballynafineshoge	209	Coshmore & Coshbride	Kilwatermoy	Lismore
Ballynagaul Beg	63	Decies within Drum	Ringagonagh	Dungarvan
Ballynagaul More	117	Decies within Drum	Ringagonagh	Dungarvan
**Ballynagaulbeg (or Ringville)**	Town	Decies within Drum	Ringagonagh	Dungarvan
Ballynageeragh	439	Middlethird	Dunhill	Kilmacthomas
Ballynagigla	241	Decies without Drum	Monksland	Kilmacthomas
Ballynagleragh	98	Decies within Drum	Ardmore	Youghal
Ballynagleragh	70	Decies without Drum	Modelligo	Dungarvan
Ballynagorkagh	144	Middlethird	Dunhill	Kilmacthomas
Ballynaguilkee Lower	331	Decies without Drum	Seskinan	Lismore
Ballynaguilkee Upper	404	Decies without Drum	Seskinan	Lismore
Ballynaharda	266	Decies within Drum	Ardmore	Dungarvan
Ballynahemery	159	Decies without Drum	Whitechurch	Dungarvan
Ballynahila	190	Decies without Drum	Ballylaneen	Kilmacthomas
Ballynakill	438	Decies without Drum	Kilgobnet	Dungarvan
Ballynakill	358	Gaultiere	Ballynakill	Waterford
Ballynalahessery North	123	Decies without Drum	Dungarvan	Dungarvan
Ballynalahessery South	101	Decies without Drum	Dungarvan	Dungarvan
Ballynameelagh	192	Decies without Drum	Whitechurch	Dungarvan
Ballynamertinagh	336	Decies within Drum	Ardmore	Youghal
Ballynamintra Lower	42	Decies without Drum	Whitechurch	Dungarvan
Ballynamintra Middle	84	Decies without Drum	Whitechurch	Dungarvan
Ballynamintra Upper	261	Decies without Drum	Whitechurch	Dungarvan
Ballynamona	464	Decies within Drum	Ardmore	Youghal
Ballynamona	33	Middlethird	Killoteran	Waterford
Ballynamona Lower	400	Decies within Drum	Ardmore	Dungarvan
Ballynamona Upper	337	Decies within Drum	Ardmore	Dungarvan
Ballynamoyntragh	702	Gaultiere	Kilmacleague	Waterford
Ballynamuck East	37	Decies without Drum	Kilrush	Dungarvan
Ballynamuck Middle	142	Decies without Drum	Kilrush	Dungarvan
Ballynamuck West	181	Decies without Drum	Kilrush	Dungarvan
Ballynamult	136	Decies without Drum	Seskinan	Lismore
Ballynamultin	540	Decies within Drum	Clashmore	Youghal
Ballynaneashagh	333	Gaultiere	Kilbarry	Waterford
Ballynaparka	235	Decies within Drum	Aglish	Dungarvan
Ballynaparka	221	Decies within Drum	Kilmolash	Dungarvan
Ballynaraha	187	Coshmore and Coshbride	Lismore & Mocollop	Lismore
Ballynarrid	244	Decies without Drum	Ballylaneen	Kilmacthomas
Ballynasissala	334	Decies without Drum	Monksland	Kilmacthomas
Ballynaskeha Beg	49	Decies without Drum	Dungarvan	Dungarvan
Ballynaskeha More	65	Decies without Drum	Dungarvan	Dungarvan
Ballynatray Commons	737	Coshmore & Coshbride	Templemichael	Youghal
Ballynatray Demesne	1,158	Coshmore & Coshbride	Templemichael	Youghal
Ballyneal	346	Upperthird	Mothel	Carrick on Suir
Ballyneety	343	Decies without Drum	Kilgobnet	Dungarvan
Ballyneety	209	Coshmore & Coshbride	Kilwatermoy	Lismore
Ballynelligan Glebe	67	Coshmore and Coshbride	Lismore & Mocollop	Lismore
Ballynerroon	150	Coshmore and Coshbride	Lismore & Mocollop	Lismore
Ballynerroon	142	Coshmore and Coshbride	Lismore & Mocollop	Lismore
Ballynevin	697	Upperthird	Mothel	Carrick on Suir
Ballynevoga	324	Decies without Drum	Kilrossanty	Kilmacthomas
Ballynicole	197	Decies within Drum	Kilmolash	Dungarvan
Ballynoe	196	Coshmore and Coshbride	Lismore & Mocollop	Lismore
Ballynoe East	155	Coshmore and Coshbride	Lismore & Mocollop	Lismore
Ballynoe West	291	Coshmore and Coshbride	Lismore & Mocollop	Lismore
Ballyogarty	222	Decies without Drum	Ballylaneen	Kilmacthomas
Ballyphilip	212	Middlethird	Reisk	Kilmacthomas
Ballyphilip East	224	Coshmore & Coshbride	Kilcockan	Lismore
Ballyphilip West	351	Coshmore & Coshbride	Kilcockan	Lismore
Ballyquin	471	Upperthird	Fenoagh	Carrick on Suir
Ballyquin	219	Decies within Drum	Lisgenan or Grange	Youghal
Ballyrafter	188	Coshmore and Coshbride	Lismore & Mocollop	Lismore
Ballyrafter Flats	94	Coshmore and Coshbride	Lismore & Mocollop	Lismore
Ballyrandle	44	Decies without Drum	Clonea	Dungarvan
Ballyreilly	99	Decies within Drum	Ringagonagh	Dungarvan
Ballyristeen	351	Decies without Drum	Monksland	Kilmacthomas
Ballyrobin	322	Gaultiere	Kilculliheen	Waterford
Ballyrobin	265	Middlethird	Dunhill	Kilmacthomas
Ballyroe	67	Coshmore & Coshbride	Kilcockan	Lismore
Ballyrohan	178	Glenahiry	Kilronan	Clonmel
Ballyrussel	147	Coshmore & Coshbride	Templemichael	Youghal
Ballysaggart Beg (East)	223	Coshmore and Coshbride	Lismore & Mocollop	Lismore
Ballysaggart Beg (Glebe)	59	Coshmore and Coshbride	Lismore & Mocollop	Lismore
Ballysaggart Beg (West)	186	Coshmore and Coshbride	Lismore & Mocollop	Lismore
Ballysaggartbeghill	316	Coshmore and Coshbride	Lismore & Mocollop	Lismore
Ballysaggartmore	311	Coshmore and Coshbride	Lismore & Mocollop	Lismore
Ballysallagh	376	Decies within Drum	Kinsalebeg	Youghal
Ballyscanlan	881	Middlethird	Islandikane	Waterford
Ballyshoneen	231	Gaultiere	Kilmacleague	Waterford
Ballyshonock	848	Decies without Drum	Rossmire	Kilmacthomas
Ballyslough	164	Upperthird	Kilmoleran	Carrick on Suir
Ballythomas	602	Upperthird	Mothel	Carrick on Suir
Ballytrisnane	281	Decies within Drum	Ardmore	Dungarvan
**Ballytruckle**	Town	Gaultiere	St. John's Without	Waterford
Ballytruckle	273	Gaultiere	St. John's Without	Waterford
Ballyvadd	420	Decies without Drum	Rossmire	Kilmacthomas
Ballyvadden	574	Decies without Drum	Monksland	Kilmacthomas
Ballyvallikin	530	Upperthird	Guilcagh	Carrick on Suir
Ballyvalloona	258	Decies without Drum	Stradbally	Kilmacthomas
Ballyvecane Lower	322	Coshmore and Coshbride	Lismore & Mocollop	Lismore
Ballyvecane Upper	149	Coshmore and Coshbride	Lismore & Mocollop	Lismore
Ballyvellon	130	Middlethird	Reisk	Waterford
Ballyvohalane	423	Decies without Drum	Kilbarrymeaden	Kilmacthomas
Ballyvoony	356	Decies without Drum	Stradbally	Kilmacthomas
Ballyvoreen	229	Gaultiere	Kilmacomb	Waterford
Ballyvoyle	527	Decies without Drum	Stradbally	Kilmacthomas
Ballywelligan	168	Coshmore and Coshbride	Lismore & Mocollop	Lismore
Barnankile	295	Decies without Drum	Kilrossanty	Kilmacthomas
Barracree	373	Decies without Drum	Kilgobnet	Dungarvan
Barracreemountain Lr.	417	Decies without Drum	Kilgobnet	Dungarvan
Barracreemountain Up.	590	Decies without Drum	Kilgobnet	Dungarvan
Barranafaddock	112	Coshmore and Coshbride	Lismore & Mocollop	Lismore
Barranaleaha	123	Decies within Drum	Ardmore	Dungarvan
Barranalira	135	Decies without Drum	Dungarvan	Dungarvan
Barranamanoge	212	Coshmore and Coshbride	Lismore & Mocollop	Lismore
Barranashingaum	244	Glenahiry	Kilronan	Clonmel
Barranastook	419	Decies within Drum	Ardmore	Dungarvan
Barranastook Lower	436	Decies without Drum	Whitechurch	Dungarvan
Barranastook Upper	107	Decies without Drum	Whitechurch	Dungarvan
Barravakeen	535	Upperthird	Killaloan	Clonmel
Barristown	280	Gaultiere	Kill St. Nicholas	Waterford
Barrysmountain	208	Coshmore and Coshbride	Lismore & Mocollop	Lismore
Bawnabraher	18	Decies without Drum	Dungarvan	Dungarvan
Bawnacarrigaun	63	Decies without Drum	Dungarvan	Dungarvan
Bawnacommera	110	Decies within Drum	Lisgenan or Grange	Youghal
Bawnagappul	57	Coshmore and Coshbride	Lismore & Mocollop	Lismore
Bawnagarrane	257	Decies within Drum	Lisgenan or Grange	Youghal
Bawnahila	29	Decies without Drum	Kilrush	Dungarvan
Bawnard	134	Upperthird	Killaloan	Clonmel
Bawnard	50	Decies within Drum	Lisgenan or Grange	Youghal
Bawnatanavoher	27	Decies without Drum	Kilrush	Dungarvan
Bawnbrack	22	Coshmore and Coshbride	Lismore & Mocollop	Lismore
Bawndaw	63	Middlethird	Killoteran	Waterford
Bawnfoun	187	Decies without Drum	Affane	Lismore
Bawnfune	631	Glenahiry	Kilronan	Clonmel
Bawnfune	285	Middlethird	Kilburne	Waterford
Bawnlaur	102	Coshmore & Coshbride	Kilcockan	Lismore
Bawnmore	63	Coshmore and Coshbride	Lismore & Mocollop	Lismore
Bawnnavinnoge	235	Decies without Drum	Modelligo	Lismore
Beallough	447	Upperthird	Guilcagh	Carrick on Suir
Bellaheen	96	Decies without Drum	Kilrossanty	Kilmacthomas
Belleville	140	Decies without Drum	Affane	Lismore
Belmount	148	Gaultiere	Kilculliheen	Waterford
Benvoy	193	Middlethird	Dunhill	Kilmacthomas
Bewley	300	Decies without Drum	Kilmolash	Lismore
Bishopscourt	318	Gaultiere	Kilcaragh	Waterford
Bishopstown	591	Upperthird	Mothel	Carrick on Suir
Black	122	Coshmore & Coshbride	Lismore & Mocollop	Lismore
Blackbog	31	Decies within Drum	Clashmore	Youghal
Blackknock	288	Middlethird	Kilmeadan	Waterford
Bleach	31	Decies within Drum	Aglish	Dungarvan
Bleanahouree	58	Decies without Drum	Affane	Lismore
Bleantasour	921	Decies without Drum	Seskinan	Dungarvan
Bleantasour Mountain	700	Decies without Drum	Seskinan	Dungarvan
Bog	190	Decies without Drum	Kilbarrymeaden	Kilmacthomas
Boggagh	139	Coshmore & Coshbride	Lismore & Mocollop	Lismore
Boggaghbaun	626	Coshmore & Coshbride	Lismore & Mocollop	Lismore
Boggaghduff	453	Coshmore & Coshbride	Lismore & Mocollop	Lismore
Bohadoon North	316	Decies without Drum	Kilgobnet	Dungarvan
Bohadoon South	584	Decies without Drum	Kilgobnet	Dungarvan
Bohadoonmountain	828	Decies without Drum	Kilgobnet	Dungarvan
Boherard	104	Decies without Drum	Dungarvan	Dungarvan
Boherawillin	289	Decies without Drum	Modelligo	Lismore
Boherboy	212	Decies within Drum	Ardmore	Dungarvan
Boherboy	154	Coshmore & Coshbride	Lismore & Mocollop	Lismore
Boherboyrea	179	Coshmore & Coshbride	Lismore & Mocollop	Lismore
Bonatouk (or Monatouk)	135	Decies without Drum	Seskinan	Lismore
Boola	642	Upperthird	Kilsheelan	Clonmel
Boola	452	Coshmore & Coshbride	Templemichael	Youghal
Boola	162	Coshmore & Coshbride	Lismore & Mocollop	Lismore
Boolabeg	325	Upperthird	Rathgormuck	Carrick on Suir
Boolabrien Lower	318	Glenahiry	Kilronan	Clonmel
Boolabrien Upper	575	Glenahiry	Kilronan	Clonmel
Boolacloghagh	907	Upperthird	Rathgormuck	Carrick on Suir
Boolakiley	204	Coshmore & Coshbride	Lismore & Mocollop	Lismore
Boolattin	810	Decies without Drum	Kilrossanty	Kilmacthomas
Boolavonteen	560	Decies without Drum	Seskinan	Dungarvan
Borheen	43	Decies without Drum	Dungarvan	Dungarvan
Brenan	634	Decies without Drum	Stradbally	Kilmacthomas
Bridane Lower	235	Coshmore & Coshbride	Lismore & Mocollop	Lismore
Bridane Upper	147	Coshmore & Coshbride	Lismore & Mocollop	Lismore
Bridgequarter	236	Decies without Drum	Whitechurch	Dungarvan
Bridgequarter	33	Coshmore & Coshbride	Templemichael	Youghal
Bridgetown	410	Upperthird	Mothel	Carrick on Suir
Briska Lower	208	Decies without Drum	Kilrossanty	Kilmacthomas
Briska Upper	147	Decies without Drum	Kilrossanty	Kilmacthomas
Broemountain	437	Decies without Drum	Seskinan	Lismore
Broemountain	387	Decies without Drum	Lickoran	Lismore
Brooklodge	52	Decies without Drum	Modelligo	Lismore
Browley East	41	Middlethird	Trinity Without	Waterford
Browley West	46	Middlethird	Trinity Without	Waterford
Brownstown	413	Gaultiere	Rathmoylan	Waterford
Brownswood	718	Upperthird	Fenoagh	Carrick on Suir
Brucetown (or Ballybrusa)	104	Decies within Drum	Lisgenan or Grange	Youghal
**Bunmahon**	Town	Decies without Drum	Ballylaneen	Kilmacthomas
Burgery	60	Decies without Drum	Dungarvan	Dungarvan
Burgessanchor	37	Coshmore & Coshbride	Lismore & Mocollop	Lismore
Butlerstown North	414	Middlethird	Kilburne	Waterford
Butlerstown South	366	Middlethird	Kilburne	Waterford
Caher	168	Middlethird	Islandikane	Waterford
Caherbaun	167	Glenahiry	Inishlounaght	Clonmel
Caherbrack	426	Glenahiry	Kilronan	Clonmel
Cahergal	210	Coshmore & Coshbride	Leitrim	Lismore
Cahernaleague	401	Decies without Drum	Seskinan	Dungarvan
Caheruane	698	Decies without Drum	Kilbarrymeaden	Kilmacthomas
Callaghane	447	Gaultiere	Ballygunner	Waterford
Camphire	546	Coshmore & Coshbride	Lismore & Mocollop	Lismore
Camphire Island	3	Decies within Drum	Aglish	Dungarvan
Camphirehill	79	Coshmore & Coshbride	Lismore & Mocollop	Lismore
Canty	319	Decies without Drum	Whitechurch	Dungarvan
Cappagh	401	Decies within Drum	Whitechurch	Dungarvan
Cappagh	67	Decies within Drum	Lisgenan or Grange	Youghal
**Cappoquin**	Town	Coshmore & Coshbride	Lismore & Mocollop	Lismore
Cappoquin	86	Coshmore & Coshbride	Lismore & Mocollop	Lismore
Cappoquin Demesne	223	Coshmore & Coshbride	Lismore & Mocollop	Lismore
Carnglass	405	Coshmore & Coshbride	Kilcockan	Lismore
Carrickadustara	266	Middlethird	Kilmeadan	Waterford
Carrickahilla	427	Decies without Drum	Stradbally	Kilmacthomas
Carrickanure	631	Middlethird	Newcastle	Waterford
Carrickarea	172	Decies without Drum	Stradbally	Kilmacthomas
Carrickaready	323	Decies without Drum	Monksland	Kilmacthomas
Carrickavarahane	214	Middlethird	Reisk	Waterford
Carrickavrantry	407	Middlethird	Islandikane	Waterford
Carrickavrantry North	184	Middlethird	Kilbride	Waterford
Carrickavrantry South	231	Middlethird	Kilbride	Waterford
Carrickbarrahane	224	Decies without Drum	Stradbally	Kilmacthomas
**Carrickbeg**	Town	Upperthird	Kilmoleran	Carrick on Suir
Carrickbeg	800	Upperthird	Kilmoleran	Carrick on Suir
Carricknabrone	123	Upperthird	Killaloan	Clonmel
Carrickphierish	140	Middlethird	Killoteran	Waterford
Carrickphilip	634	Middlethird	Newcastle	Waterford
Carricksaggart	234	Gaultiere	Crooke	Waterford
Carriganard	163	Gaultiere	Kilbarry	Waterford
Carrigane	151	Coshmore and Coshbride	Lismore & Mocollop	Lismore
Carrigaun (Hely)	73	Decies without Drum	Modelligo	Lismore
Carrigaun (Mansfield)	189	Decies without Drum	Modelligo	Dungarvan
Carrigavoe	160	Gaultiere	Kill St. Lawrence	Waterford
Carrigbrack	724	Decies without Drum	Seskinan	Dungarvan
Carrigcastle	436	Decies without Drum	Ballylaneen	Kilmacthomas
Carrigeen	840	Upperthird	Rathgormuck	Carrick on Suir
Carrigeen	727	Decies without Drum	Rossmire	Kilmacthomas
Carrigeen	422	Coshmore & Coshbride	Templemichael	Youghal
Carrigeen	365	Decies without Drum	Kilbarrymeaden	Kilmacthomas
Carrigeen	256	Decies without Drum	Affane	Lismore
Carrigeen	119	Decies within Drum	Ringagonagh	Dungarvan
Carrigeen	46	Decies within Drum	Ardmore	Dungarvan
Carrigeennageragh Big	259	Decies without Drum	Kilrossanty	Kilmacthomas
Carrigeennageragh Little	83	Decies without Drum	Kilrossanty	Kilmacthomas
Carrigeennahaha	181	Decies without Drum	Stradbally	Kilmacthomas
Carriglea	202	Decies without Drum	Whitechurch	Dungarvan
Carriglea	160	Gaultiere	Kill St. Nicholas	Waterford
Carriglong	266	Middlethird	Drumcannon	Waterford
Carrigmoorna	105	Decies without Drum	Kilrossanty	Kilmacthomas
Carrignagower East	155	Coshmore and Coshbride	Lismore & Mocollop	Lismore
Carrignagower West	158	Coshmore and Coshbride	Lismore & Mocollop	Lismore
Carrignanonshagh	139	Decies without Drum	Rossmire	Kilmacthomas
Carrigroe	240	Decies without Drum	Whitechurch	Dungarvan
Carrigroe	149	Glenahiry	Kilronan	Clonmel
Carrigroe	93	Gaultiere	Kilbarry	Waterford
Carrigroe	61	Coshmore & Coshbride	Tallow	Lismore
Carronadavderg	357	Decies within Drum	Ardmore	Youghal
Carronahyla	157	Decies within Drum	Ardmore	Dungarvan
Carronbeg	230	Decies within Drum	Ardmore	Youghal
Carrowclough	130	Upperthird	Rathgormuck	Carrick on Suir
Carrowclough	93	Upperthird	Dysert	Carrick on Suir
Carrowgarriff	150	Decies without Drum	Colligan	Dungarvan
Carrowgarriff Beg	145	Decies without Drum	Colligan	Dungarvan
Carrowgarriff More	321	Decies without Drum	Colligan	Dungarvan
Carrowleigh	204	Upperthird	Rathgormuck	Carrick on Suir
Carrowncashlane	123	Decies without Drum	Kilgobnet	Dungarvan
Carrowncashlane	56	Decies without Drum	Dungarvan	Dungarvan
Carrowntassona	174	Decies without Drum	Ballylaneen	Kilmacthomas
Castlecraddock	311	Middlethird	Dunhill	Kilmacthomas
Castlecraddockbog	50	Middlethird	Dunhill	Kilmacthomas
Castlelands	382	Coshmore and Coshbride	Lismore & Mocollop	Lismore
Castlemiles	265	Coshmore & Coshbride	Templemichael	Youghal
Castlequarter	157	Decies without Drum	Kilrossanty	Kilmacthomas
Castlequarter	73	Glenahiry	Kilronan	Clonmel
Castlequarter	64	Decies without Drum	Modelligo	Dungarvan
Castlereagh	368	Glenahiry	Kilronan	Clonmel
Castletown	585	Middlethird	Drumcannon	Waterford
Caumglen	273	Coshmore and Coshbride	Lismore & Mocollop	Lismore
**Cheekpoint**	Town	Gaultiere	Faithlegg	Waterford
Cheekpoint	199	Gaultiere	Faithlegg	Waterford
Cherrymount	245	Coshmore & Coshbride	Templemichael	Youghal
Christendom	188	Gaultiere	Kilculliheen	Waterford
Churchquarter	128	Coshmore & Coshbride	Kilwatermoy	Lismore
Churchquarter	103	Decies without Drum	Modelligo	Lismore
Churchquarter and Mill	72	Decies within Drum	Lisgenan or Grange	Youghal
Churchtown	402	Upperthird	Dysert	Carrick on Suir
Churchtownhill	268	Upperthird	Dysert	Carrick on Suir
Cladagh	282	Decies within Drum	Clashmore	Youghal
Clashanahy	136	Decies within Drum	Lisgenan or Grange	Youghal
Clashbrack	226	Decies within Drum	Ardmore	Dungarvan
Clasheenanierin	94	Coshmore and Coshbride	Lismore & Mocollop	Lismore
Clashganny	140	Upperthird	Clonagam	Carrick on Suir
Clashganny (or Kilmaloo)	191	Decies within Drum	Kinsalebeg	Youghal
Clashmalea	2	Decies without Drum	Dungarvan	Dungarvan
**Clashmore**	Town	Decies within Drum	Clashmore	Youghal
Clashmore	541	Decies within Drum	Clashmore	Youghal
Clashnadarriv	140	Decies without Drum	Kilmolash	Lismore
Clashnagoneen	247	Decies without Drum	Whitechurch	Lismore
Clashnamonadee	125	Coshmore and Coshbride	Lismore & Mocollop	Lismore
Clashnamrock	61	Coshmore and Coshbride	Lismore & Mocollop	Lismore
Clashrea	29	Middlethird	Trinity Without	Waterford
Clashroe	212	Upperthird	Clonagam	Carrick on Suir
Cleaboy	60	Middlethird	Trinity Without	Waterford
Clogh	183	Decies within Drum	Kilmolash	Dungarvan
Cloghaun	353	Coshmore and Coshbride	Lismore & Mocollop	Lismore
Cloghbog	78	Decies within Drum	Kilmolash	Dungarvan
Clogheen	291	Glenahiry	Kilronan	Clonmel
Clogherane	61	Decies without Drum	Kilrush	Dungarvan
Cloghraun	202	Decies within Drum	Ardmore	Youghal
Clonagam	692	Upperthird	Clonagam	Carrick on Suir
Clonanagh	10	Decies without Drum	Dungarvan	Dungarvan
Clonanav	300	Glenahiry	Kilronan	Clonmel
Cloncoskoran	198	Decies without Drum	Dungarvan	Dungarvan
Clondonnell	961	Upperthird	Rathgormuck	Carrick on Suir
Clonea	416	Upperthird	Mothel	Carrick on Suir
Clonea Lower	227	Decies without Drum	Clonea	Dungarvan
Clonea Middle	155	Decies without Drum	Clonea	Dungarvan
Clonea Upper	164	Decies without Drum	Clonea	Dungarvan
Cloneety	10	Decies without Drum	Dungarvan	Dungarvan
Clonfadda	176	Middlethird	Reisk	Waterford
Clonkerdin	256	Decies without Drum	Whitechurch	Dungarvan
**Clonmel**	Town	Upperthird	St. Mary's, Clonmel	Clonmel
Clonmore	17	Decies without Drum	Dungarvan	Dungarvan
Clonmoyle	202	Upperthird	Mothel	Carrick on Suir
Cloonbeg	121	Coshmore & Coshbride	Lismore & Mocollop	Lismore
Clooncogaile	511	Decies without Drum	Seskinan	Dungarvan
Close	115	Coshmore & Coshbride	Kilwatermoy	Lismore
Cluttahina	343	Decies without Drum	Affane	Lismore
Colligan Beg	232	Decies without Drum	Colligan	Dungarvan
Colligan More	339	Decies without Drum	Colligan	Dungarvan
Colliganmountain	339	Decies without Drum	Colligan	Dungarvan
Colliganwood	149	Decies without Drum	Colligan	Dungarvan
Comeragh	364	Decies without Drum	Kilrossanty	Kilmacthomas
Comeraghmountain	2,416	Decies without Drum	Kilrossanty	Kilmacthomas
Comeraghouse	353	Decies without Drum	Kilrossanty	Kilmacthomas
Common	1	Upperthird	Dysert	Carrick on Suir
Commons	367	Upperthird	Mothel	Carrick on Suir
Commons	29	Gaultiere	Killea	Waterford
Commons	9	Decies without Drum	Dungarvan	Dungarvan
Cool	345	Coshmore & Coshbride	Lismore & Mocollop	Lismore
Cool	82	Decies without Drum	Whitechurch	Dungarvan
Cooladalane Lower	168	Coshmore and Coshbride	Lismore & Mocollop	Lismore
Cooladalane Upper	191	Coshmore and Coshbride	Lismore & Mocollop	Lismore
Coolagadden	115	Middlethird	Kilmeadan	Waterford
Coolagortboy	424	Decies without Drum	Affane	Lismore
Coolahest	176	Decies without Drum	Aglish	Dungarvan
Coolanheen	144	Decies without Drum	Affane	Lismore
Coolatoor	98	Decies without Drum	Whitechurch	Dungarvan
Coolbagh	726	Decies within Drum	Clashmore	Youghal
Coolbeggan East	791	Coshmore and Coshbride	Templemichael	Youghal
Coolbeggan West	1,002	Coshmore and Coshbride	Templemichael	Youghal
Coolbooa	216	Decies within Drum	Clashmore	Youghal
Coolbunnia	353	Gaultiere	Faithlegg	Waterford
Coolcormuck	268	Decies without Drum	Dungarvan	Dungarvan
Cooldrishoge	111	Coshmore and Coshbride	Lismore & Mocollop	Lismore
Coolfinn	1,068	Upperthird	Kilmeadan	Carrick on Suir
Coolgower	117	Gaultiere	Kilbarry	Waterford
Coolishal	646	Upperthird	Kilsheelan	Clonmel
Coolishal	131	Coshmore and Coshbride	Lismore & Mocollop	Lismore
Coolnabeasoon	248	Glenahiry	Kilronan	Clonmel
Coolnacreena	362	Decies without Drum	Affane	Lismore
Coolnagoppoge	434	Middlethird	Drumcannon	Waterford
Coolnagour	282	Decies without Drum	Dungarvan	Dungarvan
Coolnahorna	724	Upperthird	Mothel	Carrick on Suir
Coolnalingady	367	Upperthird	Mothel	Carrick on Suir
Coolnamuck Demesne	319	Upperthird	Dysert	Carrick on Suir
Coolnamuck East	322	Upperthird	Dysert	Carrick on Suir
Coolnamuck West	257	Upperthird	Dysert	Carrick on Suir
Coolnanav	116	Decies without Drum	Whitechurch	Dungarvan
Coolnaneagh	144	Coshmore and Coshbride	Lismore & Mocollop	Lismore
Coolnasmear Lower	323	Decies without Drum	Kilgobnet	Dungarvan
Coolnasmear Upper	390	Decies without Drum	Kilgobnet	Dungarvan
Coolnasmearmountain	492	Decies without Drum	Kilgobnet	Dungarvan
Coolnasmuttaun	109	Coshmore and Coshbride	Lismore & Mocollop	Lismore
Coolowen	324	Coshmore and Coshbride	Lismore & Mocollop	Lismore
Coolowen Little	59	Coshmore and Coshbride	Lismore & Mocollop	Lismore
Coolroe	700	Decies within Drum	Ardmore	Dungarvan
Coolroe	590	Upperthird	Clonagam	Carrick on Suir
Coolroe	217	Upperthird	Mothel	Carrick on Suir
Coolroe	125	Decies without Drum	Modelligo	Lismore
Coolrttin	72	Middlethird	Dunhill	Waterford
Cooltegin	118	Gaultiere	Crooke	Waterford
Cooltubrid East	15	Decies without Drum	Ballylaneen	Kilmacthomas
Cooltubrid West	178	Decies without Drum	Ballylaneen	Kilmacthomas
Coolum	207	Gaultiere	Rathmoylan	Waterford
Coolum	155	Gaultiere	Corbally	Waterford
Coolydoody	233	Coshmore and Coshbride	Lismore & Mocollop	Lismore
Coolydoody North	252	Coshmore and Coshbride	Lismore & Mocollop	Lismore
Coolydoody South	232	Coshmore and Coshbride	Lismore & Mocollop	Lismore
Cooneen (or Glenassy)	93	Decies without Drum	Aglish	Dungarvan
Corbally Beg	247	Gaultiere	Corbally	Waterford
Corbally More	247	Gaultiere	Corbally	Waterford
Corradoon	567	Decies without Drum	Seskinan	Lismore
Corragina	56	Upperthird	Dysert	Carrick on Suir
Corranaskeha	51	Coshmore & Coshbride	Kilwatermoy	Lismore
Corranaskeha North	62	Coshmore & Coshbride	Kilwatermoy	Lismore
Corranaskeha South	103	Coshmore & Coshbride	Kilwatermoy	Lismore
Coumaraglinmountain	2,474	Decies without Drum	Kilgobnet	Dungarvan
Coummahon	982	Decies without Drum	Fews	Kilmacthomas
Coumnagappul	303	Decies without Drum	Seskinan	Dungarvan
Countygate	151	Coshmore & Coshbride	Leitrim	Lismore
Couse	111	Gaultiere	Kill St. Lawrence	Waterford
Cove	34	Gaultiere	St. John's Without	Waterford
Coxtown East	193	Gaultiere	Killea	Waterford
Coxtown West	224	Gaultiere	Killea	Waterford
Craggs	341	Decies within Drum	Clashmore	Youghal
Creadan	497	Gaultiere	Killea	Waterford
Creggane	59	Glenahiry	Kilronan	Clonmel
Crehanagh North	88	Upperthird	Fenoagh	Carrick on Suir
Crehanagh South	452	Upperthird	Fenoagh	Carrick on Suir
Crinalisk	246	Middlethird	Dunhill	Kilmacthomas
Crinnaghtaun East	186	Decies without Drum	Affane	Lismore
Crinnaghtaun West	190	Decies without Drum	Affane	Lismore
Croan Lower	77	Upperthird	St. Mary's, Clonmel	Clonmel
Croan Upper	45	Upperthird	St. Mary's, Clonmel	Clonmel
Crobally Lower	289	Decies within Drum	Ardmore	Dungarvan
Crobally Lower	59	Middlethird	Drumcannon	Waterford
Crobally Upper	468	Decies within Drum	Ardmore	Dungarvan
Crobally Upper	461	Middlethird	Drumcannon	Waterford
Crooke	425	Gaultiere	Crooke	Waterford
Cross	229	Gaultiere	Kill St. Nicholas	Waterford
Cross	37	Gaultiere	Kilmacomb	Waterford
Crossery	216	Coshmore & Coshbride	Kilcockan	Lismore
Crossford	130	Decies within Drum	Ardmore	Youghal
Crossford	112	Decies within Drum	Lisgenan or Grange	Youghal
Crough	407	Decies without Drum	Kilrossanty	Kilmacthomas
Crough	81	Middlethird	Dunhill	Kilmacthomas
Croughtanaul (Marquis)	2	Decies without Drum	Dungarvan	Dungarvan
Croughtanaul (Stuart)	10	Decies without Drum	Dungarvan	Dungarvan
Crushea	171	Decies within Drum	Ardmore	Youghal
Crussera	51	Decies without Drum	Dungarvan	Dungarvan
Cullenagh	365	Middlethird	Kilmeadan	Waterford
Cullencastle	390	Middlethird	Kilbride	Waterford
Cummeen	418	Decies without Drum	Fews	Kilmacthomas
Cunnigar	44	Decies within Drum	Ringagonagh	Dungarvan
Currabaha	457	Decies without Drum	Kilgobnet	Dungarvan
Currabaha East	299	Decies without Drum	Ballylaneen	Kilmacthomas
Currabaha West	354	Decies without Drum	Ballylaneen	Kilmacthomas
Curradarra	207	Decies within Drum	Aglish	Dungarvan
Curragh	291	Decies within Drum	Ardmore	Youghal
Curragh	157	Coshmore and Coshbride	Lismore & Mocollop	Lismore
Curraghacnav	298	Coshmore and Coshbride	Lismore & Mocollop	Lismore
Curraghataggart	407	Upperthird	Guilcagh	Carrick on Suir
Curraghateskin	594	Glenahiry	Kilronan	Clonmel
Curraghballintlea	568	Upperthird	Fenoagh	Carrick on Suir
Curraghduff	1,706	Upperthird	Rathgormuck	Carrick on Suir
Curraghduff	394	Upperthird	Mothel	Carrick on Suir
Curraghkiely	848	Upperthird	Rathgormuck	Clonmel
Curraghmore	1,186	Upperthird	Clonagam	Carrick on Suir
Curraghmoreen	152	Decies without Drum	Kilmolash	Dungarvan
Curraghnagarraha	223	Upperthird	Fenoagh	Carrick on Suir
Curraghnagree	172	Glenahiry	Kilronan	Clonmel
Curraghnamaddree	210	Decies without Drum	Colligan	Dungarvan
Curraghphilipeen	224	Upperthird	Mothel	Carrick on Suir
Curraghreigh North	331	Coshmore and Coshbride	Lismore & Mocollop	Lismore
Curraghreigh South	274	Coshmore and Coshbride	Lismore & Mocollop	Lismore
Curraghroche	514	Decies without Drum	Affane	Dungarvan
Curragraig	165	Coshmore and Coshbride	Lismore & Mocollop	Lismore
Curraheen	1,766	Upperthird	Rathgormuck	Carrick on Suir
Curraheen	355	Decies within Drum	Aglish	Dungarvan
Curraheen	341	Decies without Drum	Kilrossanty	Kilmacthomas
Curraheen	282	Decies without Drum	Stradbally	Kilmacthomas
Curraheen Commons	29	Decies without Drum	Kilrush	Dungarvan
Curraheen North	300	Coshmore and Coshbride	Lismore & Mocollop	Lismore
Curraheen South	346	Coshmore and Coshbride	Lismore & Mocollop	Lismore
Curraheenaris	4	Decies without Drum	Dungarvan	Dungarvan
Curraheenavoher	411	Glenahiry	Kilronan	Clonmel
Currane	12	Decies without Drum	Dungarvan	Dungarvan
Curraun	601	Decies without Drum	Kilrossanty	Kilmacthomas
Curtiswood	203	Glenahiry	Kilronan	Clonmel
Cush of Grange	244	Decies within Drum	Lisgenan or Grange	Youghal
Cushcam	46	Decies without Drum	Dungarvan	Dungarvan
Cutteen North	1,283	Decies without Drum	Kilrossanty	Kilmacthomas
Cutteen South	1,024	Decies without Drum	Kilrossanty	Kilmacthomas
Darrigal	795	Middlethird	Kilmeadan	Waterford
Deelish	332	Decies without Drum	Kilgobnet	Dungarvan
Deelishmountain	444	Decies without Drum	Kilgobnet	Dungarvan
Deerpark	326	Glenahiry	Kilronan	Clonmel
Deerpark	288	Coshmore and Coshbride	Lismore & Mocollop	Lismore
Deerpark East	267	Coshmore and Coshbride	Lismore & Mocollop	Lismore
Deerpark Mountain	131	Glenahiry	Kilronan	Clonmel
Deerpark North	552	Coshmore and Coshbride	Lismore & Mocollop	Lismore
Deerparkhill	357	Coshmore and Coshbride	Lismore & Mocollop	Lismore
Derrinlaur Lower	225	Upperthird	Killaloan	Clonmel
Derrinlaur Upper	433	Upperthird	Killaloan	Clonmel
Derry Lower	157	Decies without Drum	Modelligo	Lismore
Derry Upper	157	Decies without Drum	Modelligo	Lismore
D'Loughtane	471	Decies within Drum	Kinsalebeg	Youghal
Dobbynsparks	45	Middlethird	Trinity Without	Waterford
Doon	453	Decies without Drum	Seskinan	Lismore
Dooneen	72	Middlethird	Kilmeadan	Waterford
Dooneen	55	Middlethird	Lisnakill	Waterford
Dromana	759	Decies within Drum	Affane	Dungarvan
Dromana	343	Decies within Drum	Aglish	Dungarvan
Dromana Island	2	Decies without Drum	Affane	Lismore
Dromina	373	Gaultiere	Crooke	Waterford
Dromore	1,454	Decies within Drum	Aglish	Dungarvan
Drumcannon	293	Middlethird	Drumcannon	Waterford
Drumgorey	263	Glenahiry	Kilronan	Clonmel
Drumgullane East	220	Decies within Drum	Kinsalebeg	Youghal
Drumgullane West	167	Decies within Drum	Kinsalebeg	Youghal
Drumlohan	296	Decies without Drum	Stradbally	Kilmacthomas
Drumroe	242	Decies without Drum	Affane	Lismore
Drumroe Lower	194	Coshmore and Coshbride	Lismore & Mocollop	Lismore
Drumroe Upper	190	Coshmore and Coshbride	Lismore & Mocollop	Lismore
Drumrusk	306	Gaultiere	Kill St. Nicholas	Waterford
Drumslig	529	Decies within Drum	Ardmore	Dungarvan
Duagh	404	Middlethird	Drumcannon	Waterford
Ducarrig	227	Coshmore and Coshbride	Lismore & Mocollop	Lismore
Duckspool	165	Decies without Drum	Dungarvan	Dungarvan
Duffcarrick	178	Decies within Drum	Ardmore	Youghal
Dunabrattin	422	Decies without Drum	Kilbarrymeaden	Kilmacthomas
**Dungarvan**	Town	Decies without Drum	Dungarvan	Dungarvan
Dungarvan	95	Decies without Drum	Dungarvan	Dungarvan
Dunhill	469	Middlethird	Dunhill	Kilmacthomas
Dunhilllodge	62	Middlethird	Islandikane	Waterford
Dunmoon	264	Coshmore & Coshbride	Kilwatermoy	Lismore
Dunmoon North	342	Coshmore & Coshbride	Kilwatermoy	Lismore
Dunmoon South	211	Coshmore & Coshbride	Kilwatermoy	Lismore
**Dunmore**	Town	Gaultiere	Killea	Waterford
Dunmore	401	Gaultiere	Killea	Waterford
Dunsallagh	30	Decies without Drum	Clonea	Dungarvan
Durrow	273	Decies without Drum	Stradbally	Kilmacthomas
Dyrick	244	Decies without Drum	Lickoran	Lismore
Dyrick Lower	841	Coshmore & Coshbride	Lismore & Mocollop	Lismore
Dyrick Upper	232	Coshmore & Coshbride	Lismore & Mocollop	Lismore
Dysert	224	Decies within Drum	Ardmore	Youghal
Eaglehill	215	Decies without Drum	Modelligo	Dungarvan
Englishtown	151	Decies without Drum	Kilrossanty	Kilmacthomas
Fadduaga	187	Coshmore and Coshbride	Lismore & Mocollop	Lismore
Faha	685	Decies without Drum	Stradbally	Kilmacthomas
Faha	211	Decies within Drum	Ardmore	Dungarvan
Fahafeelagh	546	Decies without Drum	Ballylaneen	Kilmacthomas
Fairlane	24	Decies without Drum	Dungarvan	Dungarvan
Fairlanr	2	Decies without Drum	Kilrush	Dungarvan
Faithlegg	635	Gaultiere	Faithlegg	Waterford
Fallagh	342	Upperthird	Mothel	Carrick on Suir
Faranalounty	87	Decies within Drum	Ardmore	Dungarvan
Faranbullen	13	Decies without Drum	Whitechurch	Dungarvan
Farnane Lower	222	Decies without Drum	Lickoran	Lismore
Farnane Upper	233	Decies without Drum	Lickoran	Lismore
Farranalahesery	274	Decies without Drum	Kilbarrymeaden	Kilmacthomas
Farrangarret	81	Decies within Drum	Ardmore	Youghal
Farranshoneen	174	Gaultiere	Ballynakill	Waterford
Feagarrid	350	Coshmore and Coshbride	Lismore & Mocollop	Lismore
Feddans	722	Upperthird	Mothel	Carrick on Suir
Feddaun	173	Coshmore and Coshbride	Lismore & Mocollop	Lismore
Fennor North	239	Middlethird	Islandikane	Waterford
Fennor South	172	Middlethird	Islandikane	Waterford
Flowerhill	128	Coshmore and Coshbride	Lismore & Mocollop	Lismore
Fornaght	384	Gaultiere	Killea	Waterford
Fortwilliam	110	Coshmore and Coshbride	Lismore & Mocollop	Lismore
Fountain	303	Coshmore and Coshbride	Kilwatermoy	Lismore
Fox's Castle	245	Decies without Drum	Stradbally	Kilmacthomas
Furraleigh	433	Decies without Drum	Fews	Kilmacthomas
Gairha	120	Coshmore and Coshbride	Lismore & Mocollop	Lismore
Gallowshill	25	Decies without Drum	Kilrush	Dungarvan
Gallowshill	7	Decies without Drum	Dungarvan	Dungarvan
Gardenmorris	262	Decies without Drum	Kilbarrymeaden	Kilmacthomas
Garra East	77	Coshmore & Coshbride	Lismore & Mocollop	Lismore
Garra West	77	Coshmore and Coshbride	Lismore & Mocollop	Lismore
Garrahylish	194	Decies without Drum	Stradbally	Kilmacthomas
Garrananaspick	184	Decies within Drum	Ardmore	Youghal
Garranbaun	522	Decies without Drum	Kilgobnet	Dungarvan
Garranmillon Lower	537	Decies without Drum	Kilrossanty	Kilmacthomas
Garranmillon Upper	311	Decies without Drum	Kilrossanty	Kilmacthomas
Garranturton	1,063	Decies without Drum	Stradbally	Kilmacthomas
Garrarus	324	Middlethird	Drumcannon	Waterford
Garraun	141	Decies without Drum	Modelligo	Lismore
Garraun Upper	68	Decies without Drum	Modelligo	Lismore
Garraunfadda	224	Decies without Drum	Whitechurch	Dungarvan
Garravoone	371	Upperthird	Kilmoleran	Carrick on Suir
Garrison	196	Coshmore and Coshbride	Lismore & Mocollop	Lismore
Garrybrittas	165	Coshmore and Coshbride	Lismore & Mocollop	Lismore
Garryclone	327	Decies without Drum	Colligan	Dungarvan
Garrycloyne	234	Coshmore & Coshbride	Lismore & Mocollop	Lismore
Garryduff	400	Decies without Drum	Colligan	Dungarvan
Garryduff	273	Coshmore & Coshbride	Templemichael	Youghal
Garrynageragh East	161	Decies without Drum	Dungarvan	Dungarvan
Garrynageragh West	74	Decies without Drum	Dungarvan	Dungarvan
Garrynagree	308	Decies within Drum	Ardmore	Dungarvan
Garrynoe	97	Coshmore and Coshbride	Lismore & Mocollop	Lismore
Gates	97	Decies within Drum	Ardmore	Dungarvan
Gaulstown	270	Middlethird	Lisnakill	Waterford
Georgestown	450	Decies without Drum	Kilbarrymeaden	Kilmacthomas
Gibbethill	197	Middlethird and Muni. Borough	Trinity Without	Waterford
Glasha	350	Glenahiry	Kilronan	Clonmel
Glebe	37	Gaultiere	Kill St. Nicholas	Waterford
Glebe	21	Decies without Drum	Kilrush	Dungarvan
Glebe	15	Gaultiere	Killea	Waterford
Glebe	13	Glenahiry	Kilronan	Clonmel
Glebe	7	Decies within Drum	Kinsalebeg	Youghal
Glebe	5	Upperthird	St. Mary's, Clonmel	Clonmel
Glen	211	Decies without Drum	Clonea	Dungarvan
Glen Beg	283	Decies without Drum	Dungarvan	Dungarvan
Glen Beg	175	Coshmore and Coshbride	Lismore & Mocollop	Lismore
Glen East	172	Decies without Drum	Stradbally	Kilmacthomas
Glen Lower	620	Upperthird	Dysert	Carrick on Suir
Glen Lower	125	Decies without Drum	Modelligo	Dungarvan
Glen More	325	Decies without Drum	Dungarvan	Dungarvan
Glen More	309	Coshmore and Coshbride	Lismore & Mocollop	Lismore
Glen Upper	805	Upperthird	Dysert	Clonmel
Glen Upper	96	Decies without Drum	Modelligo	Dungarvan
Glen West	208	Decies without Drum	Stradbally	Kilmacthomas
Glenabbey	84	Glenahiry	Inishlounaght	Clonmel
Glenaboy	224	Coshmore & Coshbride	Tallow	Lismore
Glenaknockaun East	254	Coshmore and Coshbride	Lismore & Mocollop	Lismore
Glenaknockaun West	226	Coshmore and Coshbride	Lismore & Mocollop	Lismore
Glenaleeriska	84	Decies within Drum	Ardmore	Dungarvan
Glenary	2,502	Upperthird	St. Mary's, Clonmel	Clonmel
Glenasaggart	93	Coshmore and Coshbride	Lismore & Mocollop	Lismore
Glenassy (or Cooneen)	93	Decies within Drum	Aglish	Dungarvan
Glenavaddra	204	Decies without Drum	Whitechurch	Dungarvan
Glenaveha	274	Coshmore and Coshbride	Lismore & Mocollop	Lismore
Glencairn	542	Coshmore and Coshbride	Lismore & Mocollop	Lismore
Glencullen	409	Coshmore and Coshbride	Lismore & Mocollop	Lismore
Glendalligan	1,304	Decies without Drum	Kilrossanty	Kilmacthomas
Glendalough	2,902	Upperthird	St. Mary's, Clonmel	Clonmel
Glendaw	142	Upperthird	Killaloan	Clonmel
Glendeish East	475	Coshmore and Coshbride	Lismore & Mocollop	Lismore
Glendeish West	614	Coshmore and Coshbride	Lismore & Mocollop	Lismore
Glenfooran	119	Coshmore and Coshbride	Lismore & Mocollop	Lismore
Glengarra	234	Coshmore and Coshbride	Lismore & Mocollop	Lismore
Glengoagh	181	Coshmore & Coshbride	Kilcockan	Lismore
Glenhouse	647	Upperthird	Kilmeadan	Carrick on Suir
Glenlicky	309	Decies within Drum	Ardmore	Youghal
Glenmorrishmeen	257	Coshmore and Coshbride	Lismore & Mocollop	Lismore
Glennafallia	586	Coshmore and Coshbride	Lismore & Mocollop	Lismore
Glennagad	160	Upperthird	St. Mary's, Clonmel	Clonmel
Glennaglogh	247	Coshmore & Coshbride	Tallow	Lismore
Glennaneane	170	Decies without Drum	Seskinan	Dungarvan
Glennaneanemountain	216	Decies without Drum	Seskinan	Dungarvan
Glennanore	1,293	Upperthird	Rathgormuck	Clonmel
Glennaphuca	560	Upperthird	Mothel	Carrick on Suir
Glennawillin	73	Coshmore & Coshbride	Kilwatermoy	Lismore
Glenpatrick	1,905	Upperthird	Rathgormuck	Clonmel
Glenribbeen	179	Coshmore and Coshbride	Lismore & Mocollop	Lismore
Glenshask Beg	107	Coshmore and Coshbride	Lismore & Mocollop	Lismore
Glenshask More	278	Coshmore and Coshbride	Lismore & Mocollop	Lismore
Glenstown	343	Upperthird	Mothel	Carrick on Suir
Glentaun East	127	Coshmore & Coshbride	Lismore & Mocollop	Lismore
Glentaun West	120	Coshmore & Coshbride	Lismore & Mocollop	Lismore
Glentaunatinagh	274	Coshmore & Coshbride	Lismore & Mocollop	Lismore
Glentaunemon	184	Coshmore & Coshbride	Lismore & Mocollop	Lismore
Glenwilliam	431	Decies within Drum	Lisgenan or Grange	Youghal
Gliddane Beg	92	Decies without Drum	Kilgobnet	Dungarvan
Gliddane More	125	Decies without Drum	Kilgobnet	Dungarvan
Glistinane	167	Decies within Drum	Kinsalebeg	Youghal
Gortaclade	500	Middlethird	Kilmeadan	Waterford
Gortahilly	155	Gaultiere	Rathmoylan	Waterford
Gortavicary	294	Decies without Drum	Kilrossanty	Kilmacthomas
Gorteen	242	Decies within Drum	Ardmore	Dungarvan
Gorteen	30	Decies within Drum	Dungarvan	Dungarvan
Gortnadiha Lower	222	Decies within Drum	Ringagonagh	Dungarvan
Gortnadiha Upper	287	Decies within Drum	Ringagonagh	Dungarvan
Gortnalaght	636	Decies without Drum	Kilrossanty	Kilmacthomas
Gortnapeaky	304	Coshmore and Coshbride	Lismore & Mocollop	Lismore
Gowlaun	600	Decies within Drum	Ballymacart	Dungarvan
Gowlaun Mountain	74	Decies within Drum	Ardmore	Dungarvan
Gracedieu East	229	Middlethird	Killoteran	Waterford
Gracedieu West	394	Middlethird	Killoteran	Waterford
Graigariddy	166	Gaultiere	Killea	Waterford
Graigavalla	1,217	Upperthird	Rathgormuck	Carrick on Suir
Graignagower	983	Glenahiry	Kilronan	Clonmel
Graigue	418	Decies within Drum	Aglish	Dungarvan
Graigue	95	Gaultiere	Rathmoylan	Waterford
Graigue Beg	99	Decies without Drum	Modelligo	Lismore
Graigue More	195	Decies without Drum	Modelligo	Lismore
Graiguearush	322	Decies without Drum	Fews	Kilmacthomas
Graigueavurra	203	Decies without Drum	Modelligo	Lismore
Graiguenageeha	182	Decies without Drum	Rossmire	Kilmacthomas
Graiguenageeha	177	Decies without Drum	Stradbally	Kilmacthomas
Graigueshoneen	553	Decies without Drum	Ballylaneen	Kilmacthomas
Grallagh	189	Decies within Drum	Ardmore	Dungarvan
Grallagh Lower	239	Decies within Drum	Lisgenan or Grange	Youghal
Grallagh Upper	282	Decies within Drum	Lisgenan or Grange	Youghal
Grange	184	Decies within Drum	Lisgenan or Grange	Youghal
**Grange Lower**	Town	Gaultiere	St. John's Without	Waterford
Grange Lower	158	Gaultiere and Muni. Borough	St. John's Without	Waterford
Grange Upper	173	Gaultiere	St. John's Within	Waterford
Grange, Cush of	244	Decies within Drum	Lisgenan or Grange	Youghal
Grantstown	276	Gaultiere	Ballynakill	Waterford
Greenan	898	Decies without Drum	Rossmire	Kilmacthomas
Greenan	245	Glenahiry	Inishlounaght	Clonmel
Greenane	51	Decies without Drum	Colligan	Dungarvan
Guilcagh	780	Upperthird	Guilcagh	Carrick on Suir
Gurteen Lower	408	Upperthird	Kilsheelan	Clonmel
Gurteen Upper	1,531	Upperthird	Kilsheelan	Clonmel
Hacketstown	304	Middlethird	Newcastle	Waterford
Hacketstown	193	Decies within Drum	Ardmore	Dungarvan
Harristown	229	Gaultiere	Kilmacomb	Waterford
Harrowhill	451	Coshmore and Coshbride	Templemichael	Youghal
Headborough	536	Coshmore and Coshbride	Kilwatermoy	Lismore
Helvick	231	Decies within Drum	Ringagonagh	Dungarvan
Hunthill	89	Coshmore and Coshbride	Tallow	Lismore
Inchindrisla	473	Decies without Drum	Kilgobnet	Dungarvan
Inchindrisla Wood	110	Decies without Drum	Kilgobnet	Dungarvan
Inchinleama East	161	Coshmore and Coshbride	Leitrim	Lismore
Inchinleama West	332	Coshmore and Coshbride	Leitrim	Lismore
Island	164	Decies without Drum	Stradbally	Kilmacthomas
Islandhubbock	235	Decies without Drum	Stradbally	Kilmacthomas
Islandikane East	218	Middlethird	Islandikane	Waterford
Islandikane North	201	Middlethird	Islandikane	Waterford
Islandikane South	194	Middlethird	Islandikane	Waterford
Islandtarsney North	246	Middlethird	Islandikane	Waterford
Islandtarsney South	246	Middlethird	Islandikane	Waterford
Janeville	250	Coshmore and Coshbride	Kilwatermoy	Lismore
Joanstown	506	Upperthird	Mothel	Carrick on Suir
Johnstown	226	Middlethird	Dunhill	Waterford
Joulterspark	1	Decies without Drum	Dungarvan	Dungarvan
Kealfoun	902	Decies without Drum	Fews	Kilmacthomas
Kealroe	46	Decies without Drum	Kilgobnet	Dungarvan
Keereen Lower	170	Decies without Drum	Kilmolash	Dungarvan
Keereen Upper	261	Decies without Drum	Kilmolash	Dungarvan
Keiloge	555	Gaultiere	Kilmacleague	Waterford
Kilballyquilty	601	Upperthird	Rathgormuck	Carrick on Suir
Kilbarry	458	Gaultiere	Kilbarry	Waterford
Kilbarrymeadon	412	Decies without Drum	Kilbarrymeaden	Kilmacthomas
Kilbeg	186	Decies without Drum	Kilbarrymeaden	Kilmacthomas
Kilbeg	116	Decies without Drum	Clonea	Dungarvan
Kilbeg Lower	167	Coshmore and Coshbride	Tallow	Lismore
Kilbeg Upper	484	Coshmore and Coshbride	Tallow	Lismore
Kilbrack	596	Upperthird	Rathgormuck	Carrick on Suir
Kilbree East	385	Coshmore and Coshbride	Lismore & Mocollop	Lismore
Kilbree West	266	Coshmore and Coshbride	Lismore & Mocollop	Lismore
Kilbride North	231	Middlethird	Kilbride	Waterford
Kilbride South	231	Middlethird	Kilbride	Waterford
Kilbryan Lower	272	Decies without Drum	Kilgobnet	Dungarvan
Kilbryan Upper	461	Decies without Drum	Kilgobnet	Dungarvan
Kilcalf East	204	Coshmore and Coshbride	Tallow	Lismore
Kilcalf West	347	Coshmore and Coshbride	Tallow	Lismore
Kilcalfmountain	442	Coshmore and Coshbride	Tallow	Lismore
Kilcanavee	852	Upperthird	Mothel	Carrick on Suir
Kilcannon	240	Middlethird	Dunhill	Kilmacthomas
Kilcannon (Hely)	62	Decies without Drum	Whitechurch	Dungarvan
Kilcannon (Osborne)	151	Decies without Drum	Whitechurch	Dungarvan
Kilcaragh	333	Gaultiere	Kilcaragh	Waterford
Kilcarton	165	Middlethird	Reisk	Waterford
Kilcloher	222	Decies without Drum	Whitechurch	Lismore
Kilclooney	3,218	Upperthird	Mothel	Carrick on Suir
Kilcockan	249	Coshmore and Coshbride	Kilcockan	Lismore
Kilcohan	228	Gaultiere	Ballynakill	Waterford
Kilcolman	325	Decies without Drum	Ardmore	Dungarvan
Kilcomeragh	124	Decies without Drum	Kilrossanty	Kilmacthomas
Kilcooney	582	Decies without Drum	Seskinan	Dungarvan
Kilcop Lower	96	Gaultiere	Kilcop	Waterford
Kilcop Upper	291	Gaultiere	Kilcop	Waterford
Kilcreggane	106	Glenahiry	Kilronan	Clonmel
Kilcullen Lower	113	Gaultiere	Faithlegg	Waterford
Kilcullen Upper	193	Gaultiere	Faithlegg	Waterford
Kildermody	227	Middlethird	Newcastle	Waterford
Kilderriheen	144	Decies without Drum	Affane	Lismore
Kildroughtaun	188	Upperthird	Dysert	Carrick on Suir
Kilduane	285	Decies without Drum	Monksland	Kilmacthomas
Kilfarrasy	258	Middlethird	Islandikane	Waterford
Kilgabriel	601	Decies without Drum	Kinsalebeg	Youghal
Kilgainy Lower	50	Upperthird	St. Mary's, Clonmel	Clonmel
Kilgainy Upper	93	Upperthird	St. Mary's, Clonmel	Clonmel
Kilgobnet	300	Decies without Drum	Kilgobnet	Dungarvan
Kilgreany	256	Glenahiry	Kilronan	Clonmel
Kilgreany	186	Decies without Drum	Whitechurch	Dungarvan
Kilgrovan	68	Decies without Drum	Clonea	Dungarvan
Kilkeany	243	Decies without Drum	Seskinan	Dungarvan
Kilkeanymountain	236	Decies without Drum	Seskinan	Dungarvan
Kilknockan	201	Decies without Drum	Ardmore	Youghal
**Kill**	Town	Decies without Drum	Kilbarrymeaden	Kilmacthomas
Kill St. Lawrence	36	Gaultiere	Kill St. Lawrence	Waterford
Kill St. Nicholas	189	Gaultiere	Kill St. Nicholas	Waterford
Killadangan	400	Decies without Drum	Kilgobnet	Dungarvan
Killahaly East	148	Coshmore and Coshbride	Lismore & Mocollop	Lismore
Killahaly West	243	Coshmore and Coshbride	Lismore & Mocollop	Lismore
Killanthony	109	Coshmore and Coshbride	Kilwatermoy	Lismore
Killatoor	206	Decies within Drum	Aglish	Dungarvan
Killawlan	63	Gaultiere	Killea	Waterford
Killea	264	Coshmore and Coshbride	Templemichael	Youghal
Killea	2	Gaultiere	Killea	Waterford
Killeagh	157	Decies without Drum	Modelligo	Dungarvan
Killeenagh North	323	Coshmore & Coshbride	Kilcockan	Lismore
Killeenagh South	268	Coshmore & Coshbride	Kilcockan	Lismore
Killeenaghmountain	301	Coshmore & Coshbride	Kilcockan	Lismore
Killeeshal	108	Decies without Drum	Whitechurch	Dungarvan
Killelton	313	Decies without Drum	Stradbally	Kilmacthomas
Killerguile	515	Upperthird	Mothel	Carrick on Suir
Killineen East	179	Decies without Drum	Clonea	Dungarvan
Killineen West	338	Decies without Drum	Clonea	Dungarvan
Killinoorin	84	Decies within Drum	Ringagonagh	Dungarvan
Killone	295	Middlethird	Dunhill	Waterford
Killongford	209	Decies without Drum	Dungarvan	Dungarvan
Killosseragh	119	Decies without Drum	Dungarvan	Dungarvan
Killoteran	282	Middlethird	Killoteran	Waterford
Killowen	353	Middlethird	Drumcannon	Waterford
Killowen	245	Upperthird	Clonagam	Carrick on Suir
Killure	627	Gaultiere	Killure	Waterford
Kilmacleague East	359	Gaultiere	Kilmacleague	Waterford
Kilmacleague West	360	Gaultiere	Kilmacleague	Waterford
Kilmacomb	448	Gaultiere	Kilmacomb	Waterford
Kilmacomma	1,383	Glenahiry	Inishlounaght	Clonmel
**Kilmacthomas**	Town	Decies without Drum	Ballylaneen	Kilmacthomas
**Kilmacthomas**	Town	Decies without Drum	Rossmire	Kilmacthomas
Kilmacthomas	467	Decies without Drum	Rossmire	Kilmacthomas
Kilmagibboge	190	Decies within Drum	Kilmolash	Dungarvan
Kilmaloo (or Clashganny)	191	Decies within Drum	Kinsalebeg	Youghal
Kilmaloo East	99	Decies within Drum	Kinsalebeg	Youghal
Kilmaloo West	266	Decies within Drum	Kinsalebeg	Youghal
Kilmanahan	626	Glenahiry	Kilronan	Clogheen
Kilmanicholas	161	Coshmore & Coshbride	Kilcockan	Lismore
Kilmaquague	381	Gaultiere	Rathmoylan	Waterford
Kilmeadan	170	Middlethird	Kilmeadan	Waterford
Kilmeedy East	200	Decies within Drum	Kinsalebeg	Youghal
Kilmeedy West	118	Decies within Drum	Kinsalebeg	Youghal
Kilminnin Lower	152	Decies without Drum	Stradbally	Kilmacthomas
Kilminnin North	55	Decies without Drum	Dungarvan	Dungarvan
Kilminnin Soputh	100	Decies without Drum	Dungarvan	Dungarvan
Kilminnin Upper	163	Decies without Drum	Stradbally	Kilmacthomas
Kilmolash	61	Decies without Drum	Kilmolash	Dungarvan
Kilmore	98	Decies within Drum	Clashmore	Youghal
Kilmore East	173	Coshmore & Coshbride	Tallow	Lismore
Kilmore West	185	Coshmore & Coshbride	Tallow	Lismore
Kilmovee	692	Upperthird	Guilcagh	Carrick on Suir
Kilmoyemoge East	324	Middlethird	Kilmeadan	Waterford
Kilmoyemoge West	571	Middlethird	Kilmeadan	Waterford
Kilmoylin	551	Decies without Drum	Rossmire	Kilmacthomas
Kilmurrin	284	Decies without Drum	Kilbarrymeaden	Kilmacthomas
Kilmurry	250	Decies without Drum	Dungarvan	Dungarvan
Kilnacarriga	265	Coshmore and Coshbride	Lismore & Mocollop	Lismore
Kilnafarna Lower	308	Decies without Drum	Whitechurch	Dungarvan
Kilnafarna Upper	143	Decies without Drum	Whitechurch	Dungarvan
Kilnafrehan East	270	Decies without Drum	Kilgobnet	Dungarvan
Kilnafrehan Middle	165	Decies without Drum	Kilgobnet	Dungarvan
Kilnafrehan West	393	Decies without Drum	Kilgobnet	Dungarvan
Kilnafrehanmountain	324	Decies without Drum	Kilgobnet	Dungarvan
Kilnagrange	1,336	Decies without Drum	Fews	Kilmacthomas
Kilnamack East	710	Glenahiry	Inishlounaght	Clonmel
Kilnamack West	378	Glenahiry	Inishlounaght	Clogheen
Kilronan	546	Middlethird	Kilronan	Waterford
Kilrossanty	358	Decies without Drum	Kilrossanty	Kilmacthomas
Kilrush (Marquis)	44	Decies without Drum	Kilrush	Dungarvan
Kilrush (Power)	38	Decies without Drum	Kilrush	Dungarvan
Kilsteague	302	Middlethird	Dunhill	Kilmacthomas
Kilwatermoy	202	Coshmore & Coshbride	Kilwatermoy	Lismore
Kilwatermoymountain	206	Coshmore & Coshbride	Kilwatermoy	Lismore
Kilwinny	148	Coshmore & Coshbride	Tallow	Lismore
Kingsmeadow	59	Middlethird	Trinity Without	Waterford
Knockacaharna	310	Decies without Drum	Modelligo	Dungarvan
Knockacomortish	651	Coshmore and Coshbride	Lismore & Mocollop	Lismore
Knockacoola	196	Glenahiry	Kilronan	Clonmel
Knockacronaun	51	Decies without Drum	Affane	Lismore
Knockacullen	113	Decies without Drum	Whitechurch	Dungarvan
Knockacurrin	38	Gaultiere	Killea	Waterford
Knockadav	394	Coshmore and Coshbride	Lismore & Mocollop	Lismore
Knockaderry Lower	419	Middlethird	Newcastle	Waterford
Knockaderry Upper	87	Middlethird	Newcastle	Waterford
Knockadoonlea	322	Coshmore and Coshbride	Lismore & Mocollop	Lismore
Knockadrumalea	194	Decies without Drum	Stradbally	Kilmacthomas
Knockadullaun East	456	Coshmore and Coshbride	Lismore & Mocollop	Lismore
Knockadullaun West	166	Coshmore and Coshbride	Lismore & Mocollop	Lismore
Knockahavaun	107	Decies without Drum	Dungarvan	Dungarvan
Knockalafalla	378	Upperthird	Rathgormuck	Carrick on Suir
Knockalahara	507	Decies without Drum	Kilmolash	Lismore
Knockalassa	721	Coshmore and Coshbride	Lismore & Mocollop	Lismore
Knockalisheen	1,251	Upperthird	St. Mary's, Clonmel	Clonmel
Knockalisheen	564	Glenahiry	Kilronan	Clonmel
Knockanacullin	511	Decies without Drum	Kilrossanty	Kilmacthomas
Knockanaffrin	1,254	Upperthird	Rathgormuck	Carrick on Suir
Knockanagh	103	Middlethird	Lisnakill	Waterford
Knockanagh	57	Middlethird	Kilmeadan	Waterford
Knockananna	137	Coshmore and Coshbride	Lismore & Mocollop	Lismore
Knockanduff	266	Middlethird	Drumcannon	Waterford
Knockane	342	Upperthird	Clonagam	Carrick on Suir
Knockane	266	Decies without Drum	Kilbarrymeaden	Kilmacthomas
Knockane	182	Middlethird	Dunhill	Kilmacthomas
Knockanearis	667	Decies within Drum	Clashmore	Youghal
Knockaniska	135	Coshmore and Coshbride	Lismore & Mocollop	Lismore
Knockaniska	73	Decies within Drum	Clashmore	Youghal
Knockaniska East	425	Coshmore and Coshbride	Lismore & Mocollop	Lismore
Knockaniska West	368	Coshmore and Coshbride	Lismore & Mocollop	Lismore
Knockannanagh	500	Coshmore and Coshbride	Lismore & Mocollop	Lismore
Knockanore	182	Coshmore and Coshbride	Lismore & Mocollop	Lismore
Knockanore	157	Coshmore & Coshbride	Kilcockan	Lismore
Knockanpaddin	134	Gaultiere	Rathmoylan	Waterford
Knockanpower Lower	471	Decies without Drum	Colligan	Dungarvan
Knockanpower Lower	71	Decies within Drum	Ringagonagh	Dungarvan
Knockanpower Upper	358	Decies without Drum	Colligan	Dungarvan
Knockanpower Upper	172	Decies within Drum	Ringagonagh	Dungarvan
Knockanroe	20	Decies within Drum	Ardmore	Dungarvan
Knockaraha	99	Glenahiry	Kilronan	Clonmel
Knockateemore	155	Decies without Drum	Dungarvan	Dungarvan
Knockatoor	155	Decies within Drum	Ardmore	Youghal
Knockatouk	181	Coshmore & Coshbride	Lismore & Mocollop	Lismore
Knockatrellane	174	Glenahiry	Kilronan	Clonmel
Knockaturnory	843	Upperthird	Mothel	Carrick on Suir
Knockaun	243	Decies without Drum	Whitechurch	Dungarvan
Knockaun	132	Coshmore and Coshbride	Lismore & Mocollop	Lismore
Knockaun East	121	Coshmore and Coshbride	Lismore & Mocollop	Lismore
Knockaun North	258	Coshmore & Coshbride	Kilwatermoy	Lismore
Knockaun South	410	Coshmore & Coshbride	Kilwatermoy	Lismore
Knockaunabulloga	359	Coshmore and Coshbride	Lismore & Mocollop	Lismore
Knockaunacuit	218	Coshmore and Coshbride	Lismore & Mocollop	Lismore
Knockaunagloon	333	Decies without Drum	Kilgobnet	Dungarvan
Knockaunarast	267	Coshmore and Coshbride	Lismore & Mocollop	Lismore
Knockaunbrandaun	694	Decies without Drum	Seskinan	Dungarvan
Knockaunfargarve	135	Coshmore and Coshbride	Lismore & Mocollop	Lismore
Knockaungarriff	341	Coshmore and Coshbride	Lismore & Mocollop	Lismore
Knockaunnaglokee	205	Decies without Drum	Modelligo	Dungarvan
Knockaunnagoun	138	Decies within Drum	Lisgenan or Grange	Youghal
Knockaunroe	189	Coshmore & Coshbride	Leitrim	Lismore
Knockavannia	390	Decies without Drum	Seskinan	Dungarvan
Knockavanniamountain	519	Decies without Drum	Seskinan	Dungarvan
Knockaveelish	1,071	Coshmore and Coshbride	Lismore & Mocollop	Lismore
Knockavelish	364	Gaultiere	Killea	Waterford
Knockbaun	250	Coshmore and Coshbride	Lismore & Mocollop	Lismore
Knockboy	752	Decies without Drum	Seskinan	Dungarvan
Knockboy	492	Coshmore and Coshbride	Lismore & Mocollop	Lismore
Knockboy	228	Gaultiere	Ballygunner	Waterford
Knockboy	27	Decies without Drum	Dungarvan	Dungarvan
Knockbrack	214	Decies within Drum	Kinsalebeg	Youghal
Knockbrack	34	Decies without Drum	Dungarvan	Dungarvan
Knockcorragh	375	Coshmore and Coshbride	Lismore & Mocollop	Lismore
Knockeen	876	Middlethird	Kilburne	Waterford
Knockeengancan	234	Coshmore and Coshbride	Lismore & Mocollop	Lismore
Knockgarraun (Hely)	109	Decies without Drum	Modelligo	Lismore
Knockgarraun (Sergeant)	59	Decies without Drum	Modelligo	Lismore
Knockhouse	310	Gaultiere	Kilmacomb	Waterford
Knockhouse	143	Upperthird	Rossmire	Kilmacthomas
Knockhouse Lower	293	Middlethird	Killoteran	Waterford
Knockhouse Upper	350	Middlethird	Killoteran	Waterford
Knocklucas	103	Upperthird	St. Mary's, Clonmel	Clonmel
**Knockmahon**	Town	Decies without Drum	Monksland	Kilmacthomas
Knockmahon	154	Decies without Drum	Kilbarrymeaden	Kilmacthomas
Knockmaon	146	Decies without Drum	Whitechurch	Dungarvan
Knockmeal	611	Glenahiry	Kilronan	Clonmel
Knockmealdown	1,196	Coshmore and Coshbride	Lismore & Mocollop	Lismore
Knockmeelmore	278	Decies within Drum	Lisgenan or Grange	Youghal
Knocknaboul	455	Coshmore and Coshbride	Lismore & Mocollop	Lismore
Knocknabrone	207	Coshmore and Coshbride	Lismore & Mocollop	Lismore
Knocknacrcha	177	Upperthird	Rathgormuck	Carrick on Suir
Knocknacrohy	254	Upperthird	Guilcagh	Carrick on Suir
Knocknacrooha Lower	283	Decies without Drum	Whitechurch	Dungarvan
Knocknacrooha Upper	387	Decies without Drum	Whitechurch	Dungarvan
Knocknafallia	799	Coshmore and Coshbride	Lismore & Mocollop	Lismore
Knocknafreeny	80	Decies within Drum	Ardmore	Dungarvan
Knocknafrehane	700	Coshmore and Coshbride	Lismore & Mocollop	Lismore
Knocknagappul	217	Coshmore and Coshbride	Lismore & Mocollop	Lismore
Knocknagappul	191	Decies within Drum	Ardmore	Dungarvan
Knocknagappul	145	Gaultiere	Kill St. Nicholas	Waterford
Knocknageeragh	282	Decies without Drum	Modelligo	Lismore
Knocknageeragh (or Summerhill)	282	Decies within Drum	Lisgenan or Grange	Youghal
Knocknaglogh	185	Coshmore and Coshbride	Lismore & Mocollop	Lismore
Knocknaglogh Lower	454	Decies within Drum	Ardmore	Dungarvan
Knocknaglogh Upper	481	Decies within Drum	Ardmore	Dungarvan
Knocknagranagh	224	Decies without Drum	Dungarvan	Dungarvan
Knocknagriffin	49	Upperthird	St. Mary's, Clonmel	Clonmel
Knocknahoola	275	Decies within Drum	Ardmore	Dungarvan
Knocknalooricaun	356	Coshmore & Coshbride	Lismore & Mocollop	Lismore
Knocknaloughs	448	Coshmore & Coshbride	Lismore & Mocollop	Lismore
Knocknamaulee	212	Decies without Drum	Colligan	Dungarvan
Knocknamona	354	Decies within Drum	Ardmore	Dungarvan
Knocknamuck North	256	Coshmore & Coshbride	Lismore & Mocollop	Lismore
Knocknamuck South	113	Coshmore & Coshbride	Lismore & Mocollop	Lismore
Knocknanask	551	Coshmore & Coshbride	Lismore & Mocollop	Lismore
Knocknaraha	185	Coshmore & Coshbride	Kilwatermoy	Lismore
Knocknaree	1,258	Upperthird	Kilsheelan	Clonmel
Knocknasalla	16	Decies without Drum	Dungarvan	Dungarvan
Knocknasheega	279	Decies without Drum	Affane	Lismore
Knocknaskagh Lower	257	Decies without Drum	Kilmolash	Dungarvan
Knocknaskagh Upper	198	Decies without Drum	Kilmolash	Dungarvan
Knocknastooka	125	Decies within Drum	Lisgenan or Grange	Youghal
Knockparson	83	Gaultiere	Crooke	Waterford
Knockroe	298	Decies without Drum	Colligan	Dungarvan
Knockroe	273	Gaultiere	Kill St. Nicholas	Waterford
Knockroe	117	Coshmore & Coshbride	Lismore & Mocollop	Lismore
Knockrour	163	Coshmore & Coshbride	Tallow	Lismore
Knockyelan	452	Decies without Drum	Kilrossanty	Kilmacthomas
Knockyoolahan	157	Decies without Drum	Affane	Lismore
Knockyoolahan East	164	Decies without Drum	Clonea	Dungarvan
Knockyoolahan West	205	Decies without Drum	Clonea	Dungarvan
Labbanacallee	273	Coshmore & Coshbride	Lismore & Mocollop	Lismore
Lackamore	89	Decies without Drum	Ardmore	Youghal
Lackamore	65	Decies without Drum	Clashmore	Youghal
Lackandarra	222	Decies without Drum	Seskinan	Dungarvan
Lackandarra Lower	574	Decies without Drum	Seskinan	Dungarvan
Lackandarra Upper	394	Decies without Drum	Seskinan	Dungarvan
Lackaroe	25	Coshmore & Coshbride	Templemichael	Youghal
Lacken	202	Decies without Drum	Dungarvan	Dungarvan
Lacken	168	Decies without Drum	Affane	Lismore
Lacken	117	Gaultiere	Kilbarry	Waterford
Lackenagreany	279	Decies without Drum	Ardmore	Dungarvan
Lackendarra	78	Decies within Drum	Kinsalebeg	Youghal
Lackenfune	94	Decies without Drum	Kilrush	Dungarvan
Lackensillagh	221	Decies within Drum	Aglish	Dungarvan
Lackrea	185	Decies without Drum	Affane	Lismore
Lafone	117	Coshmore & Coshbride	Lismore & Mocollop	Lismore
Lagnagoushee	732	Decies within Drum	Ardmore	Dungarvan
Lahardan	593	Upperthird	Kilmeadan	Carrick on Suir
Landscape	141	Upperthird	Kilsheelan	Carrick on Suir
Langanoran	161	Decies without Drum	Modelligo	Dungarvan
Lauragh	308	Decies without Drum	Whitechurch	Dungarvan
Leagh	218	Decies within Drum	Ringagonagh	Dungarvan
Leckaun	232	Gaultiere	Killea	Waterford
Lefanta	52	Decies without Drum	Affane	Lismore
Lefanta Island	8	Decies without Drum	Affane	Lismore
Lemybrien	537	Decies without Drum	Kilrossanty	Kilmacthomas
Lemybrien	13	Decies without Drum	Stradbally	Kilmacthomas
Leperstown	825	Gaultiere	Killea	Waterford
Lickoran	215	Decies without Drum	Lickoran	Lismore
Lickoranmountain	96	Decies without Drum	Lickoran	Lismore
Limekilnclose	111	Coshmore & Coshbride	Tallow	Lismore
Lisard	76	Decies without Drum	Ballylaneen	Kilmacthomas
Lisduggan	58	Middlethird	Kilburne	Waterford
Lisduggan Big	198	Middlethird	Trinity Without	Waterford
Lisduggan Little	9	Middlethird	Trinity Without	Waterford
Lisfennel	110	Decies without Drum	Kilrush	Dungarvan
Lisfennel	8	Decies without Drum	Dungarvan	Dungarvan
Lisfinny	115	Coshmore and Coshbride	Lismore & Mocollop	Lismore
Lisglass	64	Coshmore & Coshbride	Kilcockan	Lismore
Lisgriffin	161	Decies within Drum	Aglish	Dungarvan
Lisheen	54	Upperthird	Killaloan	Clonmel
Lisheenoona	51	Decies without Drum	Dungarvan	Dungarvan
Liskeelty	117	Decies within Drum	Ballymacart	Youghal
Liskeelty	85	Decies within Drum	Ardmore	Youghal
Lisleagh	263	Decies without Drum	Lickoran	Lismore
Lisleaghmountain	156	Decies without Drum	Lickoran	Lismore
**Lismore**	Town	Coshmore & Coshbride	Lismore & Mocollop	Lismore
Lismore	155	Middlethird	Killoteran	Waterford
Lismore	139	Coshmore & Coshbride	Lismore & Mocollop	Lismore
Lisnageragh	427	Decies without Drum	Ballylaneen	Kilmacthomas
Lisnagree	123	Coshmore and Coshbride	Lismore & Mocollop	Lismore
Lisnakill	200	Middlethird	Lisnakill	Waterford
Lisroe	238	Decies without Drum	Modelligo	Dungarvan
Liss	316	Coshmore and Coshbride	Lismore & Mocollop	Lismore
Lissahane	305	Decies without Drum	Newcastle	Kilmacthomas
Lissaniska	94	Decies within Drum	Lisgenan or Grange	Youghal
Lissarow	175	Decies within Drum	Ballymacart	Youghal
Lissarow	127	Decies within Drum	Ardmore	Youghal
Lissasmuttaun	375	Upperthird	Clonagam	Carrick on Suir
Lissaviron	191	Middlethird	Dunhill	Kilmacthomas
Lissavironbog	66	Middlethird	Dunhill	Kilmacthomas
Lisselan	578	Middlethird	Drumcannon	Waterford
Lisselty	247	Gaultiere	Rathmoylan	Waterford
Listeige	151	Decies within Drum	Lisgenan or Grange	Youghal
Little Island	289	Gaultiere	Ballynakill	Waterford
Littlebridge Inches	53	Decies without Drum	Affane	Lismore
Littlegrace	20	Coshmore and Coshbride	Lismore & Mocollop	Lismore
Logleagh	268	Coshmore and Coshbride	Lismore & Mocollop	Lismore
Logloss	27	Middlethird	Trinity Without	Waterford
Longcourse	52	Middlethird and Muni. Borough	Trinity Without	Waterford
Loskeran	369	Decies within Drum	Ardmore	Dungarvan
Loughaniska	80	Decies without Drum	Dungarvan	Dungarvan
Loughanunna	51	Decies without Drum	Dungarvan	Dungarvan
Loughdeheen	734	Middlethird	Lisnakill	Waterford
Loughmore	23	Decies without Drum	Kilrush	Dungarvan
Loughnasollis Lower	115	Coshmore & Coshbride	Tallow	Lismore
Loughnasollis Upper	116	Coshmore & Coshbride	Tallow	Lismore
Loughnatouse	128	Coshmore & Coshbride	Tallow	Lismore
Luskanargid	52	Decies without Drum	Kilrush	Dungarvan
Lyranearla	449	Upperthird	St. Mary's, Clonmel	Clonmel
Lyrattin	594	Decies without Drum	Lickoran	Lismore
Lyre	237	Decies within Drum	Ardmore	Dungarvan
Lyre	205	Decies without Drum	Kilrossanty	Kilmacthomas
Lyre East	613	Coshmore & Coshbride	Lismore & Mocollop	Lismore
Lyre East	296	Decies without Drum	Seskinan	Dungarvan
Lyre Mountain	1,419	Decies without Drum	Seskinan	Dungarvan
Lyre West	351	Decies without Drum	Seskinan	Dungarvan
Lyre West	110	Coshmore & Coshbride	Lismore & Mocollop	Lismore
Lyrenacallee East	141	Coshmore & Coshbride	Lismore & Mocollop	Lismore
Lyrenacallee West	150	Coshmore & Coshbride	Lismore & Mocollop	Lismore
Lyrenacarriga	275	Coshmore & Coshbride	Kilwatermoy	Lismore
Lyrenaglogh	292	Coshmore & Coshbride	Lismore & Mocollop	Lismore
Magaha	312	Decies without Drum	Whitechurch	Lismore
Manalour Upper	234	Coshmore and Coshbride	Lismore & Mocollop	Lismore
Manor	64	Gaultiere and Muni. Borough	St. John's Without	Waterford
Mapestown	191	Decies without Drum	Kilrush	Dungarvan
Matthewstown	178	Middlethird	Reisk	Waterford
Mayfield (or Rocketscastle)	495	Upperthird	Clonagam	Carrick on Suir
Meoul	252	Coshmore and Coshbride	Lismore & Mocollop	Lismore
Middlequarter	97	Decies without Drum	Dungarvan	Dungarvan
Mill and Churchquarter	72	Decies within Drum	Lisgenan or Grange	Youghal
Millerstown	203	Decies without Drum	Stradbally	Kilmacthomas
Moanballyshivane	44	Decies within Drum	Lisgenan or Grange	Youghal
Moanbrack	140	Decies within Drum	Ardmore	Dungarvan
Moanfoun	134	Decies within Drum	Ardmore	Dungarvan
Moanfune	105	Coshmore and Coshbride	Tallow	Lismore
Moat	24	Decies within Drum	Ringagonagh	Dungarvan
Mocollop	375	Coshmore and Coshbride	Lismore & Mocollop	Lismore
Monabreeka	141	Coshmore and Coshbride	Lismore & Mocollop	Lismore
Monacallee	20	Upperthird	St. Mary's, Clonmel	Clonmel
Monacullee	364	Decies within Drum	Ardmore	Dungarvan
Monadiha	388	Upperthird	Rathgormuck	Carrick on Suir
Monafehadee	158	Coshmore and Coshbride	Lismore & Mocollop	Lismore
Monagally West	287	Decies within Drum	Aglish	Dungarvan
Monageela	437	Decies within Drum	Ardmore	Dungarvan
Monagilleeny	163	Decies within Drum	Ardmore	Youghal
Monagoush	270	Decies within Drum	Ardmore	Dungarvan
Monakirka	155	Decies without Drum	Stradbally	Kilmacthomas
Monalour Lower	180	Coshmore and Coshbride	Lismore & Mocollop	Lismore
Monalummery	237	Decies within Drum	Ardmore	Dungarvan
Monaman Lower	141	Coshmore and Coshbride	Lismore & Mocollop	Lismore
Monaman Upper	168	Coshmore and Coshbride	Lismore & Mocollop	Lismore
Monameean	476	Decies within Drum	Ardmore	Dungarvan
Monameelagh	219	Middlethird	Islandikane	Waterford
Monamintra	356	Gaultiere	Monamintra	Waterford
Monamraher	183	Decies within Drum	Ardmore	Dungarvan
Monaneea	171	Decies within Drum	Ardmore	Dungarvan
Monang	83	Coshmore and Coshbride	Kilcockan	Lismore
Monang	52	Decies without Drum	Dungarvan	Dungarvan
Monard	369	Coshmore and Coshbride	Lismore & Mocollop	Lismore
Monarud	239	Decies without Drum	Kilgobnet	Dungarvan
Monarudmountain	331	Decies without Drum	Kilgobnet	Dungarvan
Monataggart	153	Coshmore and Coshbride	Lismore & Mocollop	Lismore
Monatarriv East	230	Coshmore and Coshbride	Lismore & Mocollop	Lismore
Monatarriv West	268	Coshmore and Coshbride	Lismore & Mocollop	Lismore
Monatouk (or Bonatouk)	135	Decies without Drum	Seskinan	Lismore
Monatray East	205	Decies within Drum	Kinsalebeg	Youghal
Monatray Middle	293	Decies within Drum	Kinsalebeg	Youghal
Monatray West	163	Decies within Drum	Kinsalebeg	Youghal
Monatrim Lower	159	Coshmore and Coshbride	Lismore & Mocollop	Lismore
Monatrim Upper	200	Coshmore and Coshbride	Lismore & Mocollop	Lismore
Monavaud	56	Decies without Drum	Stradbally	Kilmacthomas
Monavugga	140	Coshmore and Coshbride	Lismore & Mocollop	Lismore
Monboy	158	Coshmore and Coshbride	Lismore & Mocollop	Lismore
Monea	432	Decies within Drum	Ardmore	Youghal
Moneygorm	202	Decies without Drum	Affane	Lismore
Moneygorm East	253	Decies without Drum	Affane	Lismore
Moneygorm North	166	Coshmore and Coshbride	Lismore & Mocollop	Lismore
Moneygorm South	219	Coshmore and Coshbride	Lismore & Mocollop	Lismore
Moneygorm West	141	Decies without Drum	Affane	Lismore
Mongally East	156	Decies within Drum	Aglish	Dungarvan
Monkeal	12	Decies without Drum	Dungarvan	Dungarvan
Monloum	47	Middlethird	Drumcannon	Waterford
Monminane	663	Upperthird	Mothel	Carrick on Suir
Monroe Glebe	9	Decies without Drum	Dungarvan	Dungarvan
Monvore	83	Coshmore and Coshbride	Lismore & Mocollop	Lismore
Monvoy	242	Middlethird	Drumcannon	Waterford
Monyvroe	361	Decies without Drum	Affane	Dungarvan
Moord	62	Decies within Drum	Kinsalebeg	Youghal
Moorehill	255	Coshmore and Coshbride	Kilwatermoy	Lismore
Mortgage	148	Decies within Drum	Kinsalebeg	Youghal
Mothel	259	Upperthird	Mothel	Carrick on Suir
Mountain Rea	112	Coshmore and Coshbride	Lismore & Mocollop	Lismore
Mountaincastle North	165	Decies without Drum	Modelligo	Dungarvan
Mountaincastle South	184	Decies without Drum	Modelligo	Dungarvan
Mountainfarm	232	Coshmore and Coshbride	Lismore & Mocollop	Lismore
Mountbolton	658	Upperthird	Clonagam	Carrick on Suir
Mountcongreve	118	Middlethird	Kilmeadan	Waterford
Mountcongreve	65	Middlethird	Lisnakill	Waterford
Mountmelleray	555	Coshmore and Coshbride	Lismore & Mocollop	Lismore
Mountmisery	52	Gaultiere and Muni. Borough	Kilculliheen	Waterford
Mountodell	192	Decies without Drum	Whitechurch	Dungarvan
Mountrivers	48	Decies without Drum	Affane	Lismore
Mountrivers Islands	12	Decies without Drum	Affane	Lismore
Mountsion	69	Gaultiere and Muni. Borough	Kilculliheen	Waterford
Mountstuart	196	Decies within Drum	Ardmore	Dungarvan
Moyng	388	Decies within Drum	Ardmore	Youghal
Moyng Little	125	Decies within Drum	Ardmore	Dungarvan
Munmahoge	288	Middlethird	Kilburne	Waterford
Munmahoge	191	Middlethird	Kilbride	Waterford
Munnsburrow	870	Upperthird	Mothel	Carrick on Suir
Mweelahorna	248	Decies within Drum	Ringagonagh	Dungarvan
Mweelahorna	127	Decies within Drum	Ardmore	Dungarvan
Mweelin	117	Decies within Drum	Ardmore	Dungarvan
Newport East	329	Coshmore & Coshbride	Kilcockan	Lismore
Newport West	137	Coshmore & Coshbride	Kilcockan	Lismore
Newrath	553	Gaultiere	Kilculliheen	Waterford
Newtown	344	Middlethird	Drumcannon	Waterford
Newtown	272	Gaultiere	Crooke	Waterford
Newtown	233	Decies within Drum	Ardmore	Youghal
Newtown	227	Decies without Drum	Rossmire	Kilmacthomas
Newtown	211	Decies within Drum	Kinsalebeg	Youghal
Newtown	208	Middlethird	Islandikane	Kilmacthomas
Newtown	172	Decies without Drum	Modelligo	Lismore
Newtown	157	Decies without Drum	Stradbally	Kilmacthomas
Newtown	154	Coshmore & Coshbride	Templemichael	Youghal
Newtown	148	Gaultiere and Muni. Borough	St. John's Without	Waterford
Newtown	142	Middlethird	Kilmeadan	Waterford
Newtown	112	Gaultiere	Kilculliheen	Waterford
Newtown	96	Decies without Drum	Dungarvan	Dungarvan
Nicholastown	46	Decies without Drum	Whitechurch	Lismore
Norrisland	113	Coshmore and Coshbride	Lismore & Mocollop	Lismore
Nymphhall	56	Gaultiere	Killea	Waterford
Okyle	175	Coshmore and Coshbride	Lismore & Mocollop	Lismore
Oldbridge	51	Upperthird and Muni. Borough	St. Mary's, Clonmel	Clonmel
Oldgrange	572	Upperthird	Mothel	Carrick on Suir
Orchardstown	251	Gaultiere	Kilmacleague	Waterford
Orchardstown	206	Middlethird	Kilburne	Waterford
Paddock	100	Coshmore & Coshbride	Kilwatermoy	Lismore
Paddocks	161	Coshmore and Coshbride	Lismore & Mocollop	Lismore
Pallis	62	Coshmore and Coshbride	Lismore & Mocollop	Lismore
Park	546	Upperthird	Rathgormuck	Carrick on Suir
Park	177	Decies without Drum	Stradbally	Kilmacthomas
Parkatluggera	128	Coshmore and Coshbride	Lismore & Mocollop	Lismore
Parkatluggera	17	Decies without Drum	Dungarvan	Dungarvan
Parkbeg	172	Upperthird	Rathgormuck	Carrick on Suir
Parkdotia	297	Coshmore & Coshbride	Tallow	Lismore
Parkeenaflugh	13	Decies without Drum	Dungarvan	Dungarvan
Parkeenagarra	74	Decies without Drum	Whitechurch	Dungarvan
Parkeenalougha	10	Decies without Drum	Kilrush	Dungarvan
Parkeennaglogh	251	Decies without Drum	Rossmire	Kilmacthomas
Parkgarriff	51	Coshmore & Coshbride	Tallow	Lismore
Parklane	8	Decies without Drum	Dungarvan	Dungarvan
Parkmore	63	Decies without Drum	Modelligo	Lismore
Parknagappul	14	Decies without Drum	Dungarvan	Dungarvan
Parknoe	105	Coshmore and Coshbride	Lismore & Mocollop	Lismore
Parkswood Lower	128	Gaultiere	Kill St. Nicholas	Waterford
Parkswood Upper	163	Gaultiere	Kill St. Nicholas	Waterford
**Passage**	Town	Gaultiere	Kill St. Nicholas	Waterford
Passage East	5	Gaultiere	Kill St. Nicholas	Waterford
Passage West	3	Gaultiere	Kill St. Nicholas	Waterford
Pastimeknock	49	Middlethird	Trinity Without	Waterford
Paulsacres	40	Decies without Drum	Kilrossanty	Kilmacthomas
Pembrokestown	191	Middlethird	Lisnakill	Waterford
Pickardstown	247	Middlethird	Drumcannon	Waterford
Pillpark	16	Decies within Drum	Clashmore	Youghal
Pilltown	337	Decies within Drum	Kinsalebeg	Youghal
Portally	116	Gaultiere	Killea	Waterford
**Portlaw**	Town	Upperthird	Clonagam	Carrick on Suir
Portnaboe	284	Upperthird	Fenoagh	Carrick on Suir
Poulavone	237	Upperthird	Rathgormuck	Clonmel
Poulbautia	277	Decies without Drum	Affane	Lismore
Poulboy	123	Upperthird	St. Mary's, Clonmel	Clonmel
Poulfadda	229	Coshmore and Coshbride	Lismore & Mocollop	Lismore
Poulnagunoge	670	Upperthird	St. Mary's, Clonmel	Clonmel
Powersknock	295	Middlethird	Kilmeadan	Waterford
Prap	162	Decies within Drum	Ardmore	Youghal
Priorsknock	51	Gaultiere	St. John's Without	Waterford
Propoge	284	Coshmore & Coshbride	Templemichael	Youghal
Prospecthall	358	Decies within Drum	Kinsalebeg	Youghal
Pulla	270	Decies within Drum	Ardmore	Dungarvan
Quarter	79	Decies without Drum	Affane	Lismore
Quillia	289	Middlethird	Drumcannon	Waterford
Racecourse	143	Coshmore & Coshbride	Tallow	Lismore
Raheen	200	Gaultiere	Crooke	Waterford
Raheen	97	Upperthird	St. Mary's, Clonmel	Clonmel
Raheen	13	Decies within Drum	Clashmore	Youghal
Raheens	569	Middlethird	Kilmeadan	Waterford
Ralph	79	Coshmore and Coshbride	Lismore & Mocollop	Lismore
Raspberryhill	169	Coshmore and Coshbride	Leitrim	Lismore
Rath	419	Decies within Drum	Kinsalebeg	Youghal
Rath	292	Upperthird	Fenoagh	Carrick on Suir
Rath Lower	114	Coshmore & Coshbride	Lismore & Mocollop	Lismore
Rath Upper	118	Coshmore & Coshbride	Lismore & Mocollop	Lismore
Rathanny	418	Decies without Drum	Kilbarrymeaden	Kilmacthomas
Rathculliheen	305	Gaultiere	Kilculliheen	Waterford
Rathfaddan	53	Middlethird	Trinity Without	Waterford
**Rathgormuck**	Town	Upperthird	Mothel	Carrick on Suir
**Rathgormuck**	Town	Upperthird	Rathgormuck	Carrick on Suir
Rathgormuck	112	Upperthird	Rathgormuck	Carrick on Suir
Rathlead	278	Decies within Drum	Ardmore	Dungarvan
Rathmaiden	647	Decies without Drum	Fews	Kilmacthomas
Rathmoylan	280	Gaultiere	Rathmoylan	Waterford
Rathnameneenagh	364	Decies within Drum	Ardmore	Dungarvan
Rathnameneenagh	254	Decies within Drum	Ringagonagh	Dungarvan
Rathnaskilloge	223	Decies without Drum	Stradbally	Kilmacthomas
Rathquage	269	Decies without Drum	Kilbarrymeaden	Kilmacthomas
Reacaumaglanna	200	Coshmore & Coshbride	Lismore & Mocollop	Lismore
Readoty	86	Decies within Drum	Ringagonagh	Dungarvan
Reamanagh	169	Decies within Drum	Ballymacart	Dungarvan
Reamanagh East	258	Decies within Drum	Ardmore	Dungarvan
Reamanagh West	422	Decies within Drum	Ardmore	Dungarvan
Reanabarna	344	Coshmore and Coshbride	Lismore & Mocollop	Lismore
Reanaboola	255	Decies within Drum	Ardmore	Youghal
Reanaclogheen	224	Decies within Drum	Ardmore	Dungarvan
Reanacoolagh East	261	Coshmore and Coshbride	Lismore & Mocollop	Lismore
Reanacoolagh West	400	Coshmore and Coshbride	Lismore & Mocollop	Lismore
Reanadampaun Commons	1,003	Decies without Drum	Seskinan	Dungarvan
Reanadampaun Commons	873	Glenahiry	Kilronan	Clonmel
Reanagullee	305	Decies within Drum	Ardmore	Dungarvan
Reanaskeha	203	Decies within Drum	Ardmore	Dungarvan
Reanaviddoge	196	Decies within Drum	Ardmore	Dungarvan
Reatagh	149	Upperthird	Fenoagh	Carrick on Suir
Reisk	273	Middlethird	Reisk	Waterford
Rincrew	265	Coshmore & Coshbride	Templemichael	Youghal
Ringaphuca	9	Decies without Drum	Dungarvan	Dungarvan
Ringcrehy	64	Decies without Drum	Dungarvan	Dungarvan
Ringnasilloge	34	Decies without Drum	Dungarvan	Dungarvan
**Ringville (or Ballynagaulbeg)**	Town	Decies within Drum	Ringagonagh	Dungarvan
Robertstown	535	Decies without Drum	Rossmire	Kilmacthomas
Robertstown	191	Decies without Drum	Kilrossanty	Kilmacthomas
Rocketscastle (or Mayfield)	495	Upperthird	Clonagam	Carrick on Suir
Rockfield	131	Decies without Drum	Modelligo	Lismore
Rockshire	137	Gaultiere and Muni. Borough	Kilculliheen	Waterford
Rodeen	40	Decies within Drum	Ardmore	Youghal
Ross	1,024	Upperthird	Mothel	Carrick on Suir
Ross	433	Middlethird	Newcastle	Waterford
Ross	79	Decies without Drum	Whitechurch	Dungarvan
Ross	78	Coshmore and Coshbride	Lismore & Mocollop	Lismore
Rossduff	196	Gaultiere	Rossduff	Waterford
Rossgrilla	83	Coshmore & Coshbride	Lismore & Mocollop	Lismore
Rusheens	114	Decies within Drum	Ardmore	Dungarvan
Russellstown	1,722	Glenahiry	Kilronan	Clonmel
Russellstown New	890	Glenahiry	Kilronan	Clonmel
Salterbridge	402	Coshmore and Coshbride	Lismore & Mocollop	Lismore
Sapperton North	210	Coshmore & Coshbride	Kilwatermoy	Lismore
Sapperton South	292	Coshmore & Coshbride	Kilwatermoy	Lismore
Savagetown	201	Middlethird	Dunhill	Kilmacthomas
Scart	185	Coshmore & Coshbride	Kilcockan	Lismore
Scart	166	Decies without Drum	Whitechurch	Dungarvan
Scart	42	Coshmore and Coshbride	Lismore & Mocollop	Lismore
Scart	32	Decies without Drum	Dungarvan	Dungarvan
Scart (Hely)	95	Decies without Drum	Modelligo	Lismore
Scart (Sergeant)	76	Decies without Drum	Modelligo	Lismore
Scartacrooka	99	Decies without Drum	Stradbally	Kilmacthomas
Scartlea	214	Upperthird	Dysert	Clonmel
Scartmountain	1,209	Decies without Drum	Modelligo	Lismore
Scartnacrooha	140	Coshmore and Coshbride	Lismore & Mocollop	Lismore
Scartnadriny	185	Decies without Drum	Kilgobnet	Dungarvan
Scartnadrinymountain	530	Decies without Drum	Kilgobnet	Dungarvan
Scartore	67	Decies without Drum	Dungarvan	Dungarvan
Scordann	127	Decies within Drum	Ardmore	Dungarvan
Scrahan	470	Decies without Drum	Rossmire	Kilmacthomas
Scrahans	285	Decies within Drum	Ardmore	Dungarvan
Scrahans East	154	Coshmore and Coshbride	Lismore & Mocollop	Lismore
Scrahans West	160	Coshmore and Coshbride	Lismore & Mocollop	Lismore
**Scrothea**	Town	Upperthird	St. Mary's, Clonmel	Clonmel
Scrothea East	163	Upperthird	St. Mary's, Clonmel	Clonmel
Scrothea West	132	Upperthird	St. Mary's, Clonmel	Clonmel
Seafield	341	Decies without Drum	Ballylaneen	Kilmacthomas
Seemochuda	248	Coshmore and Coshbride	Lismore & Mocollop	Lismore
Shanaclone	361	Middlethird	Dunhill	Kilmacthomas
Shanacloon	33	Decies within Drum	Ringagonagh	Dungarvan
Shanacool	173	Decies without Drum	Stradbally	Kilmacthomas
Shanacoole	455	Decies within Drum	Clashmore	Youghal
Shanakill	614	Decies without Drum	Rossmire	Kilmacthomas
Shanakill	455	Upperthird	Rathgormuck	Carrick on Suir
Shanakill	303	Decies within Drum	Aglish	Dungarvan
Shanakill	114	Decies within Drum	Ringagonagh	Dungarvan
Shanakill	86	Decies without Drum	Dungarvan	Dungarvan
Shanapollagh	62	Coshmore & Coshbride	Kilwatermoy	Lismore
Shanavoola	170	Coshmore & Coshbride	Lismore & Mocollop	Lismore
Shanbally	313	Decies without Drum	Kilrossanty	Kilmacthomas
Shanbally	179	Decies within Drum	Ringagonagh	Dungarvan
Shanbally	178	Coshmore & Coshbride	Lismore & Mocollop	Lismore
Shanbally	84	Decies within Drum	Lisgenan or Grange	Youghal
Shanballyanne	359	Decies without Drum	Seskinan	Dungarvan
Shandon	160	Decies without Drum	Dungarvan	Dungarvan
Shandon Island	2	Decies without Drum	Dungarvan	Dungarvan
Shean Beg	163	Coshmore & Coshbride	Lismore & Mocollop	Lismore
Shean More	480	Coshmore & Coshbride	Lismore & Mocollop	Lismore
Sheskin	600	Upperthird	Kilmoleran	Carrick on Suir
Sheskin	200	Decies without Drum	Stradbally	Kilmacthomas
Sheskin	152	Decies without Drum	Affane	Lismore
Shinganagh	155	Middlethird	Lisnakill	Waterford
Sillaheens	394	Glenahiry	Kilronan	Clonmel
Sion	80	Coshmore & Coshbride	Lismore & Mocollop	Lismore
Skehacrine (Humble)	77	Decies without Drum	Dungarvan	Dungarvan
Skehacrine (Marquis)	8	Decies without Drum	Dungarvan	Dungarvan
Skehanard (Barron)	29	Decies without Drum	Dungarvan	Dungarvan
Skehanard (Humble)	23	Decies without Drum	Dungarvan	Dungarvan
Skibbereen	110	Middlethird	Killoteran	Waterford
Sleadycastle	77	Decies without Drum	Modelligo	Dungarvan
**Sleveen**	Town	Decies without Drum	Kilbarrymeaden	Kilmacthomas
Sleveen	225	Decies without Drum	Kilbarrymeaden	Kilmacthomas
Sleveen	82	Coshmore & Coshbride	Kilcockan	Lismore
Slieveburth	72	Coshmore & Coshbride	Kilwatermoy	Lismore
Slieveroe	239	Middlethird	Lisnakill	Waterford
Sligaunagh	31	Decies without Drum	Dungarvan	Dungarvan
Sluggara	135	Decies without Drum	Affane	Lismore
Smallquarter	68	Glenahiry	Kilronan	Clonmel
Smoor Beg	122	Middlethird	Dunhill	Kilmacthomas
Smoor More	248	Middlethird	Dunhill	Kilmacthomas
Snugborough	114	Coshmore & Coshbride	Kilwatermoy	Lismore
Southpark	126	Coshmore & Coshbride	Lismore & Mocollop	Lismore
Spa	66	Upperthird	St. Mary's, Clonmel	Clonmel
Sporthouse	339	Middlethird	Kilbride	Waterford
Spring (Duke)	29	Decies without Drum	Kilrush	Dungarvan
Spring (Marquis)	32	Decies without Drum	Kilrush	Dungarvan
Springfield	85	Coshmore & Coshbride	Tallow	Lismore
Springfield	76	Decies without Drum	Affane	Lismore
Springfield Lower	92	Decies within Drum	Kinsalebeg	Youghal
Springfield Upper	15	Decies within Drum	Kinsalebeg	Youghal
Springmount	7	Decies without Drum	Kilrush	Dungarvan
Sruh East	173	Coshmore and Coshbride	Lismore & Mocollop	Lismore
Sruh West	123	Coshmore and Coshbride	Lismore & Mocollop	Lismore
Stael	60	Coshmore & Coshbride	Templemichael	Youghal
Staigbraud	53	Decies without Drum	Modelligo	Lismore
Stonehouse	459	Middlethird	Kilmeadan	Waterford
**Stradbally**	Town	Decies without Drum	Stradbally	Kilmacthomas
Stradbally Beg	246	Decies without Drum	Stradbally	Kilmacthomas
Stradbally More	503	Decies without Drum	Stradbally	Kilmacthomas
Strancally	256	Coshmore & Coshbride	Kilcockan	Lismore
Strancally Demesne	196	Coshmore & Coshbride	Kilcockan	Lismore
Stuccolane	3	Decies without Drum	Dungarvan	Dungarvan
Summerhill (or Knocknageeragh)	282	Decies within Drum	Lisgenan or Grange	Youghal
Summerville	61	Gaultiere	Ballynakill	Waterford
Sunlawn	93	Decies without Drum	Affane	Lismore
Tallacoolbeg	56	Decies without Drum	Dungarvan	Dungarvan
Tallacoolmore	151	Decies without Drum	Kilgobnet	Dungarvan
**Tallow**	Town	Coshmore & Coshbride	Tallow	Lismore
Tallow	74	Coshmore & Coshbride	Tallow	Lismore
**Tallowbridge**	Town	Coshmore & Coshbride	Lismore & Mocollop	Lismore
Tallowbridge Lands	104	Coshmore & Coshbride	Lismore & Mocollop	Lismore
Tankardstwon	235	Decies without Drum	Kilbarrymeaden	Kilmacthomas
Templeeyvrick	279	Decies without Drum	Ballylaneen	Kilmacthomas
Templemichael	119	Coshmore & Coshbride	Templemichael	Youghal
Terrysstang	4	Decies without Drum	Dungarvan	Dungarvan
Ticor	91	Middlethird	Trinity Without	Waterford
Tigroe	291	Middlethird	Kilmeadan	Waterford
Tikincor Lower	115	Upperthird	Killaloan	Clonmel
Tikincor Upper	264	Upperthird	Killaloan	Clonmel
Tiknock	453	Decies within Drum	Clashmore	Youghal
Tinakilly (or Woodhouse)	464	Decies within Drum	Kilmolash	Dungarvan
Tinalira	307	Decies without Drum	Modelligo	Dungarvan
Tinhalla	363	Upperthird	Fenoagh	Carrick on Suir
Tinnabinna	264	Decies within Drum	Clashmore	Youghal
Tinnagroun	88	Coshmore and Coshbride	Lismore & Mocollop	Lismore
Tinnalyra	262	Decies within Drum	Lisgenan or Grange	Youghal
Tinnascart	653	Decies within Drum	Aglish	Dungarvan
Tintur	125	Coshmore and Coshbride	Lismore & Mocollop	Lismore
Tircullen Lower	105	Coshmore & Coshbride	Kilwatermoy	Lismore
Tircullen Upper	80	Coshmore & Coshbride	Kilwatermoy	Lismore
Tober	151	Coshmore and Coshbride	Lismore & Mocollop	Lismore
Toberagoole	15	Decies within Drum	Kinsalebeg	Youghal
Tobernahulla	452	Coshmore and Coshbride	Lismore & Mocollop	Lismore
Tonteheige	160	Decies within Drum	Lisgenan or Grange	Youghal
Toor	367	Upperthird	Dysert	Clonmel
Toor	211	Decies within Drum	Lisgenan or Grange	Youghal
Toor	209	Coshmore and Coshbride	Lismore & Mocollop	Lismore
Toor	67	Decies without Drum	Modelligo	Lismore
Toor North	658	Decies within Drum	Ardmore	Dungarvan
Toor South	356	Decies within Drum	Ardmore	Youghal
Tooracurragh	206	Glenahiry	Kilronan	Clonmel
Tooradoo	124	Coshmore and Coshbride	Lismore & Mocollop	Lismore
Toorala	194	Glenahiry	Kilronan	Clonmel
Tooranaraheen	955	Coshmore and Coshbride	Lismore & Mocollop	Lismore
Tooraneena	318	Decies without Drum	Seskinan	Dungarvan
Tooreen East	621	Decies without Drum	Seskinan	Dungarvan
Tooreen West	318	Decies without Drum	Seskinan	Dungarvan
Tooreenmountain	704	Decies without Drum	Seskinan	Dungarvan
Toornageeha	173	Coshmore and Coshbride	Lismore & Mocollop	Lismore
toornagoppoge	86	Coshmore and Coshbride	Lismore & Mocollop	Lismore
Toorreagh	251	Glenahiry	Kilronan	Clonmel
Toortane	184	Coshmore and Coshbride	Lismore & Mocollop	Lismore
Tourin	89	Coshmore and Coshbride	Lismore & Mocollop	Lismore
Tourin Demesne	451	Coshmore and Coshbride	Lismore & Mocollop	Lismore
Tournore	62	Decies without Drum	Dungarvan	Dungarvan
Towergare	409	Middlethird	Kilburne	Waterford
Townparks	171	Coshmore and Coshbride	Lismore & Mocollop	Lismore
Townparks East	251	Coshmore & Coshbride	Tallow	Lismore
Townparks East	210	Coshmore and Coshbride	Lismore & Mocollop	Lismore
Townparks West	321	Coshmore & Coshbride	Tallow	Lismore
Townparks West	181	Coshmore and Coshbride	Lismore & Mocollop	Lismore
Tramore Burrow	217	Middlethird	Drumcannon	Waterford
Tramore East	155	Middlethird	Drumcannon	Waterford
Tramore West	138	Middlethird	Drumcannon	Waterford
Treenearla Commons	375	Decies without Drum	Kilrossanty	Kilmacthomas
Trinity Without	68	Waterford, Muni. Borough of	Trinity Without	Waterford
Tubbrid	80	Coshmore and Coshbride	Lismore & Mocollop	Lismore
Turbeha	249	Decies without Drum	Affane	Lismore
Twomilebridge	193	Decies without Drum	Dungarvan	Dungarvan
Vicarstown North	136	Decies without Drum	Modelligo	Dungarvan
Vicarstown South	164	Decies without Drum	Modelligo	Dungarvan
**Villierstown**	Town	Decies without Drum	Aglish	Dungarvan
Villierstown	190	Decies without Drum	Aglish	Dungarvan
**Waterford City**	Town	Waterford City	St. John's Within	Waterford
**Waterford City**	Town	Waterford City	St. John's Without	Waterford
**Waterford City**	Town	Waterford City	St. Michael's	Waterford
**Waterford City**	Town	Waterford City	St. Olave's	Waterford
**Waterford City**	Town	Waterford City	St. Patrick's	Waterford
**Waterford City**	Town	Waterford City	St. Peter's	Waterford
**Waterford City**	Town	Waterford City	St. Stephen's Within	Waterford
**Waterford City**	Town	Waterford City	St. Stephen's Without	Waterford
**Waterford City**	Town	Waterford City	Trinity Within	Waterford
**Waterford City**	Town	Waterford City	Trinity Without	Waterford
Westtown	343	Middlethird	Drumcannon	Waterford
Whitechurch	49	Decies without Drum	Whitechurch	Dungarvan
Whitefield	170	Middlethird	Islandikane	Waterford
Whitehousequarter	69	Glenahiry	Kilronan	Clonmel
Whitesfort	223	Glenahiry	Kilronan	Clonmel
Whitestown	330	Decies without Drum	Rossmire	Kilmacthomas
Whitestown East	510	Upperthird	Mothel	Carrick on Suir
Whitestown West	676	Upperthird	Mothel	Carrick on Suir
Whitfield North	339	Middlethird	Lisnakill	Waterford
Whitfield South	339	Middlethird	Lisnakill	Waterford
Williamstown	549	Gaultiere	Ballynakill	Waterford
Williamstown	312	Decies without Drum	Stradbally	Kilmacthomas
Windgap	300	Decies without Drum	Dungarvan	Dungarvan
Windgap (or Ardmore)	76	Upperthird	Dysert	Carrick on Suir
Woodhouse	394	Decies without Drum	Stradbally	Kilmacthomas
Woodhouse	104	Decies without Drum	Modelligo	Dungarvan
Woodhouse (or Tinakilly)	464	Decies without Drum	Kilmolash	Dungarvan
Woodstock	302	Decies without Drum	Kilmolash	Dungarvan
Woodstown	437	Middlethird	Killoteran	Waterford
Woodstown	414	Middlethird	Islandikane	Kilmacthomas
Woodstown Lower	271	Gaultiere	Kilmacomb	Waterford
Woodstown Upper	292	Gaultiere	Kilmacomb	Waterford
Woodville	141	Coshmore and Coshbride	Lismore & Mocollop	Lismore
