= St. George's Church, Dublin =

Former church in Dublin, Ireland

Coordinates: 53.357279°N 6.262873°W

St. George's Church
- Eaglais San Seoirse
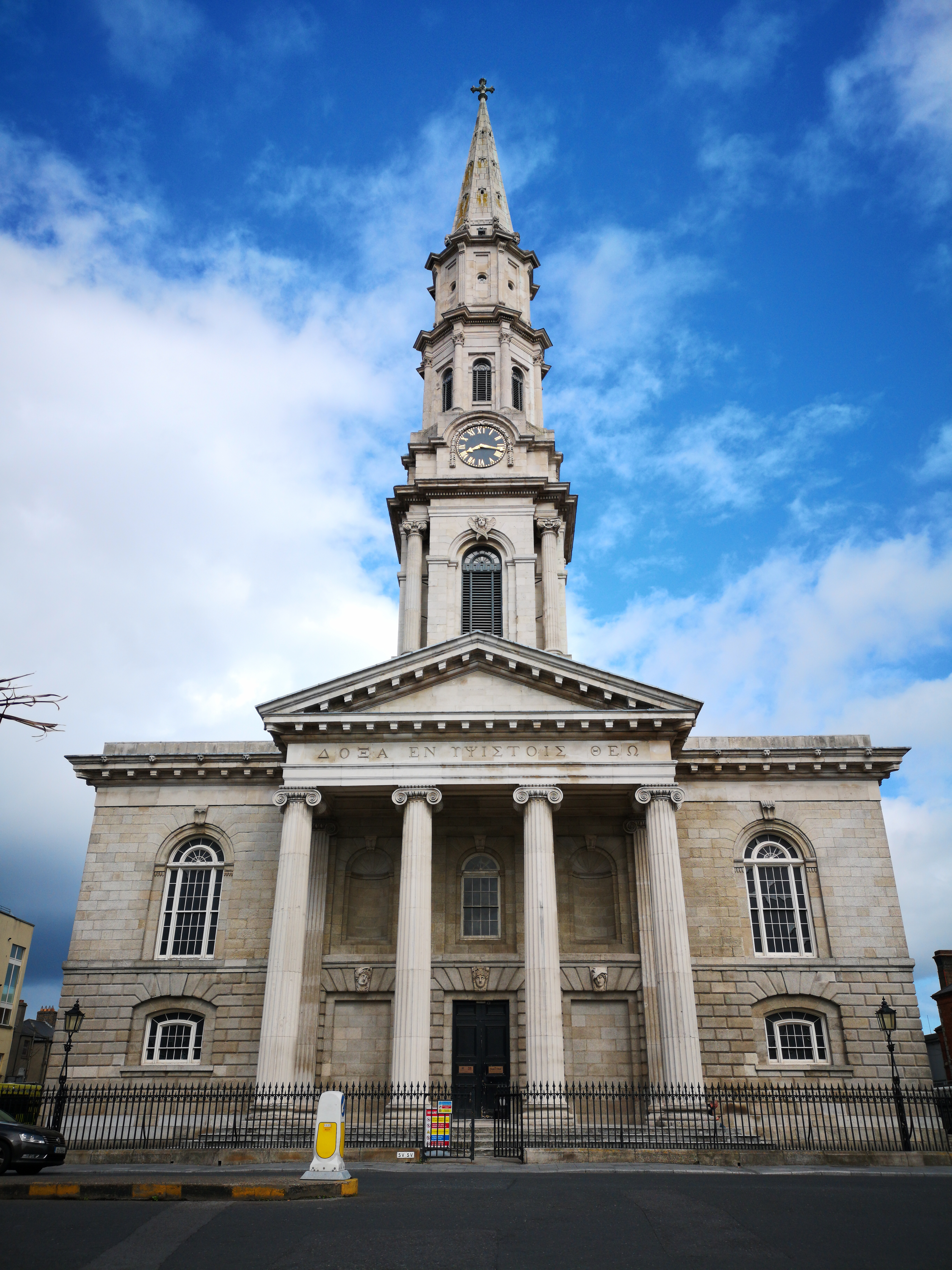

- Location: Hardwicke Place, Dublin
- Country: Ireland
- Language: English
- Denomination: Church of Ireland

History
- Founded: 1802
- Dedication: Saint George

Architecture
- Architect: Francis Johnston
- Architectural type: Gothic Revival and Greek Revival
- Construction cost: £90,000
- Closed: 1990

Specifications
- Length: (exterior) 84 feet (25.6 m)
- Width: (exterior) 92 feet (28.0 m)

Administration
- Diocese: Dublin and Glendalough
- Parish: Parish of St. George

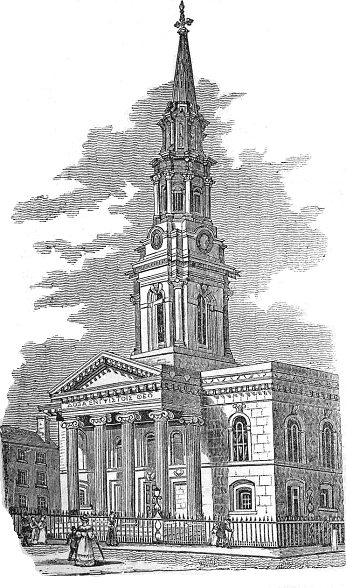
St. George's Church, mid-19th century.

St. George's Church is a former parish church in Dublin, Ireland. Designed by Francis Johnston, it is considered to be one of his finest works. The structure is located at Hardwicke Place, just north of the city centre, though when it was opened this was considered to be in Drumcondra. The elegant spire, 200 feet (61.0 m) high, became a landmark of the north inner city. Along with St Andrew's Church, Chennai, it is considered one of the finest stylistic "daughter" churches to London's St Martin-in-the-Fields.

== The building ==
=== Early history ===
St. George's Parish Act 1793
- Act of Parliament
- Parliament of Ireland
- Long title: An Act for making and constituting a new Parish, by the Name of the Parish of Saint George, on the Ground adjoining the City of Dublin therein described, and for erecting and building a Parish Church therein.
- Citation: 33 Geo. 3. c. 53 (I)
- Territorial extent: Ireland

Dates
- Royal assent: 16 August 1793
- Commencement: 10 January 1793 (Note: Start of session.)

Text of statute as originally enacted

Parish of St. George Dublin Act 1806
- Act of Parliament
- Parliament of the United Kingdom
- Long title: An Act for altering and enlarging the Provisions of an Act passed in the Parliament of Ireland, in the Thirty third Year of His present Majesty, for making and constituting a new Parish, by the Name of The Parish of Saint George, on the Ground adjoining the City of Dublin therein described, and for erecting and building a Parish Church therein.
- Citation: 46 Geo. 3. c. cxxiii

Dates
- Royal assent: 12 July 1806

Text of statute as originally enacted

Parish of St. George, Dublin Act 1814
- Act of Parliament
- Parliament of the United Kingdom
- Long title: An Act for enlarging the Provisions of an Act passed in the Forty sixth Year of His present Majesty, intituled "An Act for altering and enlarging the Provisions of an Act passed in the Parliament of Ireland in the Thirty third Year of His present Majesty, for making and constituting a new Parish by the Name of "The Parish of Saint George," on the Ground adjoining the City of Dublin, therein described; and for making and building a Parish Church therein."
- Citation: 54 Geo. 3. c. lxxviii

Dates
- Royal assent: 27 May 1814

Text of statute as originally enacted

Construction of the "New St. George's church, Drumcondra", at the end of Temple Street commenced in 1802 by the Church of Ireland for the parish of St. George, which had been established by the St. George's Parish Act 1793 (33 Geo. 3. c. 53 (I)). There had been an Old St. George's church, Drumcondra, in nearby Hill Street (then called Lower Temple Street) erected by Sir John Eccles. The Eccles family were patrons of the "new church". Another "Drumcondra Church" is the St. John the Baptist Church, in Church Street, Dublin.

The original site acquired for the new church (donated by Luke Gardiner, 1st Viscount Mountjoy) was on Whitworth Road, but then the present site was selected, which at the time was open fields. A temporary chapel was built on the Whitworth Road site and the churchyard was retained when St. George's was completed, this site was later taken over by the Whitworth Hospital (later named Drumcondra Hospital). The Greek inscription on the portico, ΔΟΞΑ ΕΝ ΥΨΙΣΤΟΙΣ ΘΕΩ (doxa en hypsistois Theō), translates to 'Glory to God in the Highest'.

It was a 'free church', within the Established Church, where no pew rents were paid and it survived on voluntary subscriptions.

Twenty-two years after the church was built, problems developed when the wide roof began to splay further than it should, due to the strain of the wide-span timber trusses. Civil engineer Robert Mallet, whose father ran an iron foundry in Dublin, created cast-iron trusses to haul the church back into shape.

=== Late history ===
In the 1980s scaffolding had to be erected around the spire because the Portland stone was cracking due to expansion of the iron cramps that held it in place. The Church of Ireland, having tried in vain to raise funds for the restoration of the church, sold the building in 1991 to an actor, Mr Sean Simon, who had plans to turn it into a theatre.

After its deconsecration, the bells (which Leopold Bloom heard ringing in Ulysses) were removed to Taney Parish church in Dundrum, while the ornate pulpit was carved up to decorate Thomas Read's pub in Parliament Street.

=== After deconsecration ===
The church in Temple Street then became the Temple Theatre, then a night-club, but further attempts were made to raise public funds for its restoration; first, in 1991, to celebrate Dublin's role as European City of Culture, and later from the Millennium Committee.

In 2004 the building found a new purchaser who oversaw extensive restoration and renovation to provide office facilities.

== The parish ==
Shortly after the construction of the church, in 1813, the population of the parish was 5,322 males and 7,690 females (these included Roman Catholics as well as Protestants).

An early Rector of St George's parish was Revd William Bushe, who, in 1823, invited Roman Catholics who were resident in the parish to discuss matters of faith. The church was filled for his series of evangelical Wednesday evening lectures which discussed the doctrines of the Roman Catholic Church. Future Bishop of Killaloe, Sterling Berry served as curate from 1878 to 1884. Future Bishop of Meath and Archbishop of Dublin Joseph Peacocke served as Rector from 1873 to 1878.

Rev. Charles Henry Minchin also served in the church. Rev. Samuel Eccles was also a chaplain to the church. Rev. Cecil Faull also served the church as a curate, and then as Rector from 1971 until 1980.

The St. George's Widows home was connected to the church as was the St. Georges Dispensary on Dispensary Lane, off Lower Dorset Street, with the priests of the parish and laypeople as trustees of the Dispensary.

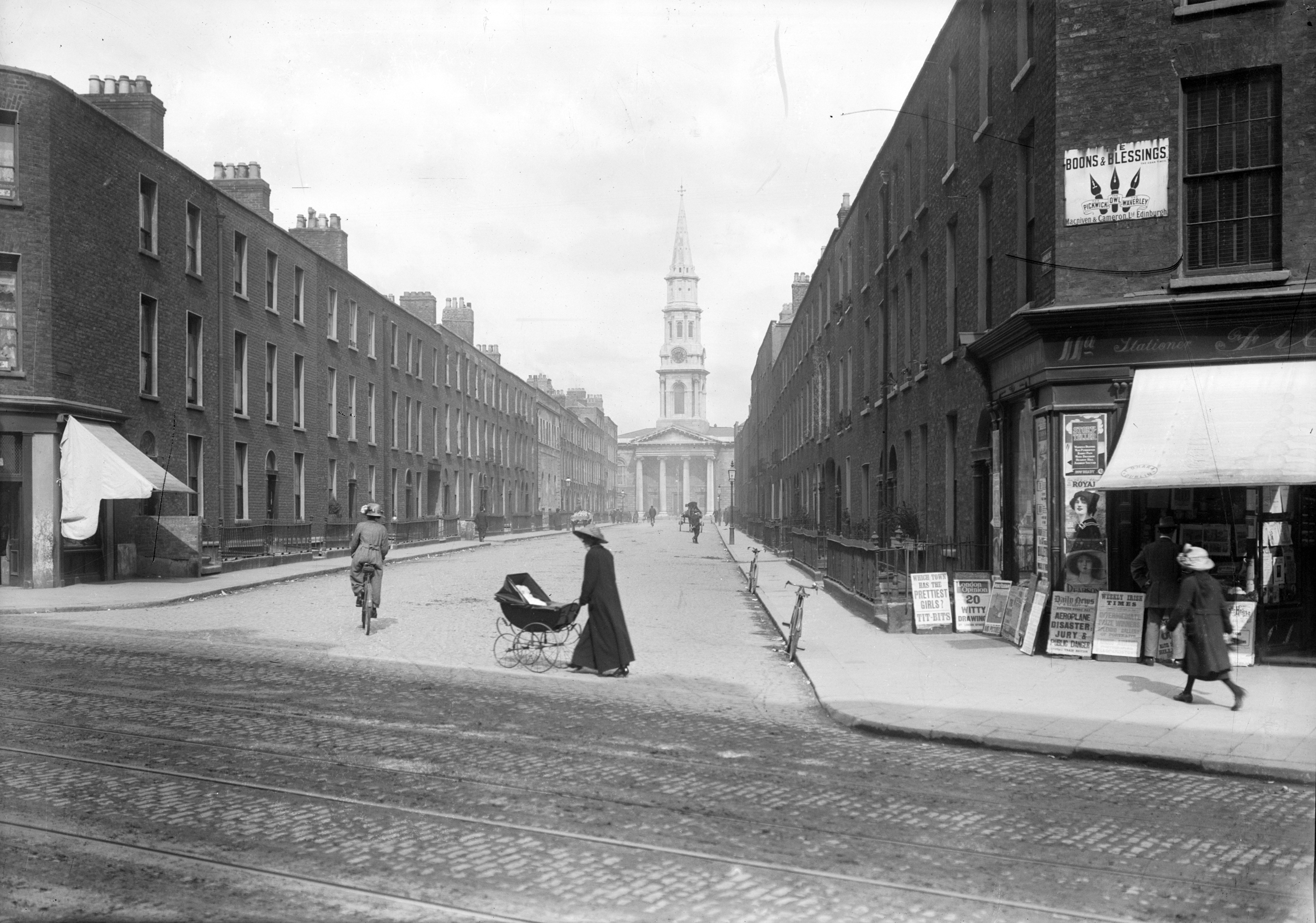
Early 20th century view of the church at the end of Hardwicke Street

In the 20th century the parish grew steadily and was in the 1950s the largest in the Republic. At the time it was served by three other churches: St. Aidan's (Drumcondra Road Lwr and Dargle Road, Iron building from 1881, a new building designed by Richard Francis Caulfield Orpen was consecrated in 1902, demolished in 1963), Dublin Female Penitentiary (St. Augustine's) on Berkely Road and the Free Church (Great Charles Street), in addition to the parish church.

In 1936 the St. George's Brass Band was founded in the church.

The Church of St. Thomas opened in Cathal Brugha Street in 1931, in 1966 St. Georges merged with the parish of St. Thomas's. In 1990 St. George's closed, and it became the parish church of St. George and St. Thomas. Since 2016, and the closure of St. Thomas Cathal Brugha St., Drumcondra Church(and North Strand) serve the Parish of St. George and St. Thomas.

=== Civil parish ===
The parish corresponded with the civil parish of the same name.

== Notable parishioners ==
In 1806, Sir Arthur Wellesley, famous a few years later as the Duke of Wellington, married Catherine Pakenham, daughter of the Earl of Longford, in the temporary chapel built on Whitworth Road.

In 1812 the scientist Richard Kirwan was buried in the church.

George Salmon (1819–1904), mathematician and theologian, and Provost of Trinity College Dublin, was baptised at St George's church.

Roger Casement's mother, Anne, was baptised there on 16 September 1832 as was her sister Grace in 1841.

The architect, Francis Johnston (architect), lived in nearby Eccles Street. In his garden he had built a Gothic church tower, whose bell he enjoyed ringing, but his neighbours persuaded him in 1828 to donate the bell to the new church he had designed. He was buried in St. George's churchyard, which was attached to the temporary chapel on Whitworth Road.

John Sullivan SJ who lived on Eccles Street, was baptised in St. Georges's. Later in life he converted to Catholicism and became a Jesuit.

Percy Edwin Ludgate 1883–1922, notable as the second person to publish (in 1909) a design for an Analytical Engine, after Babbage, and who hence some consider a genuine Irish computer hero, attended St. George's Church.

Annie Hutton, fiancée of Thomas Davis (Young Irelander), is buried in St. George's Graveyard, Whitworth Road.

== See also ==
- St Martin-in-the-Fields

=== Gallery ===
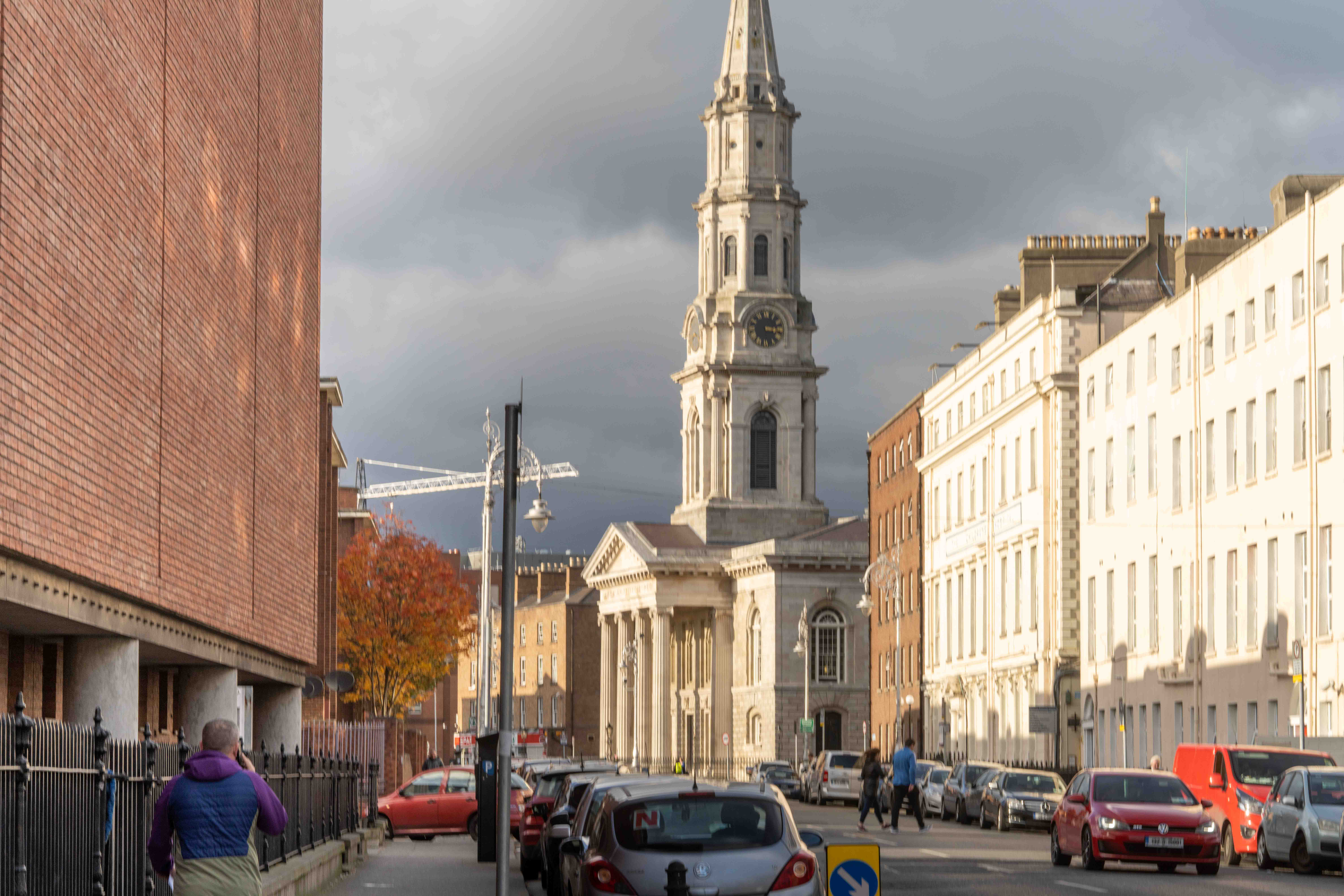

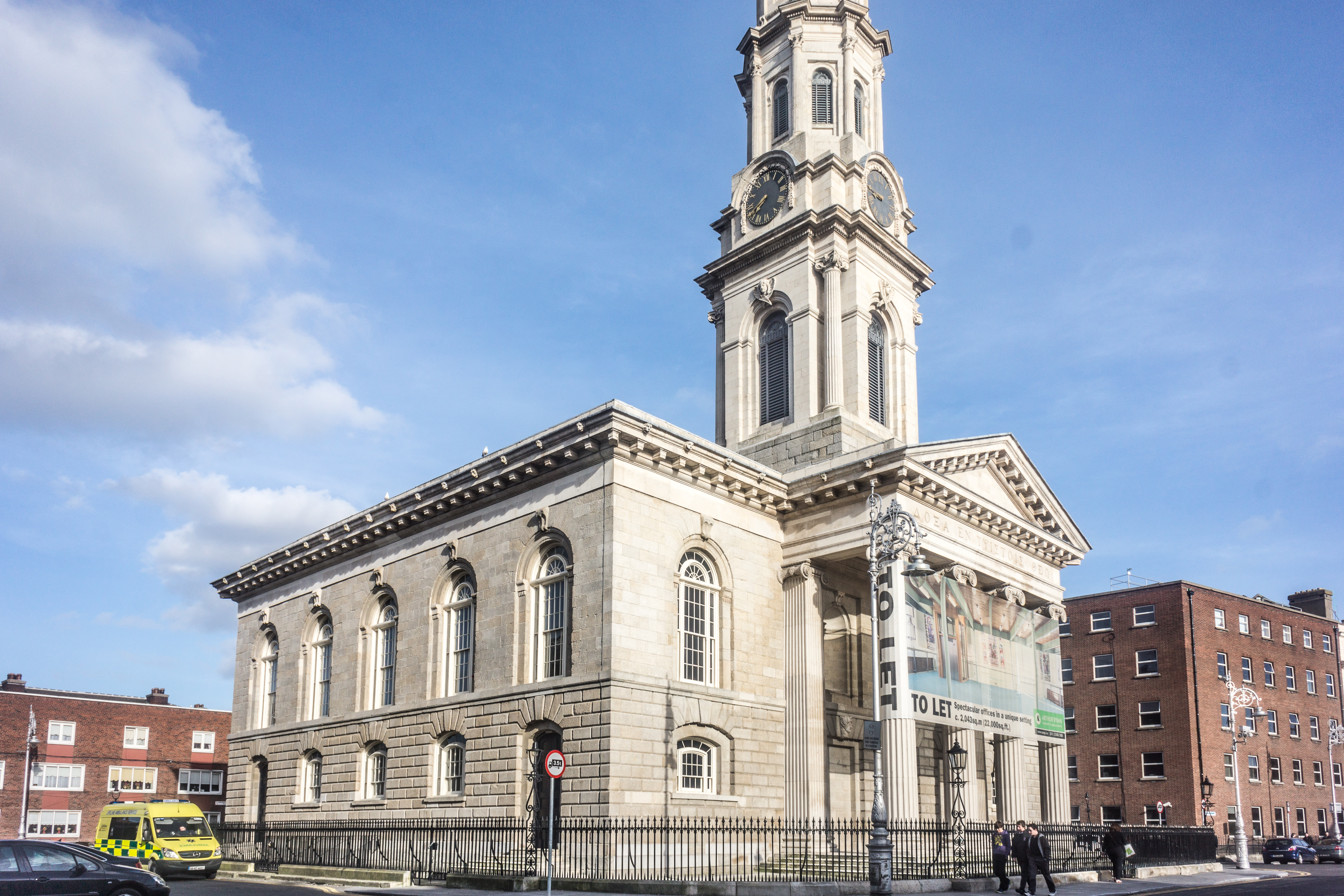

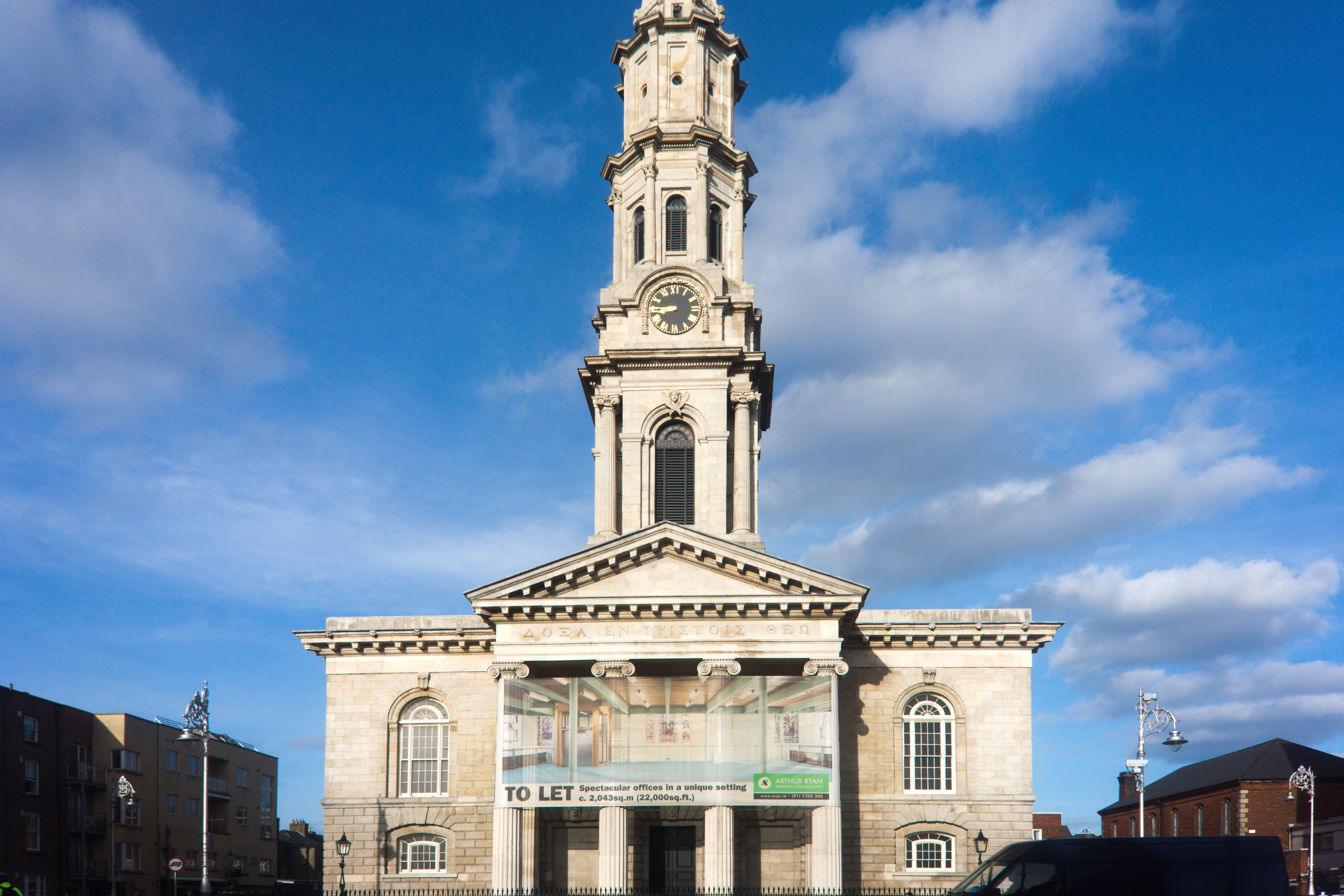

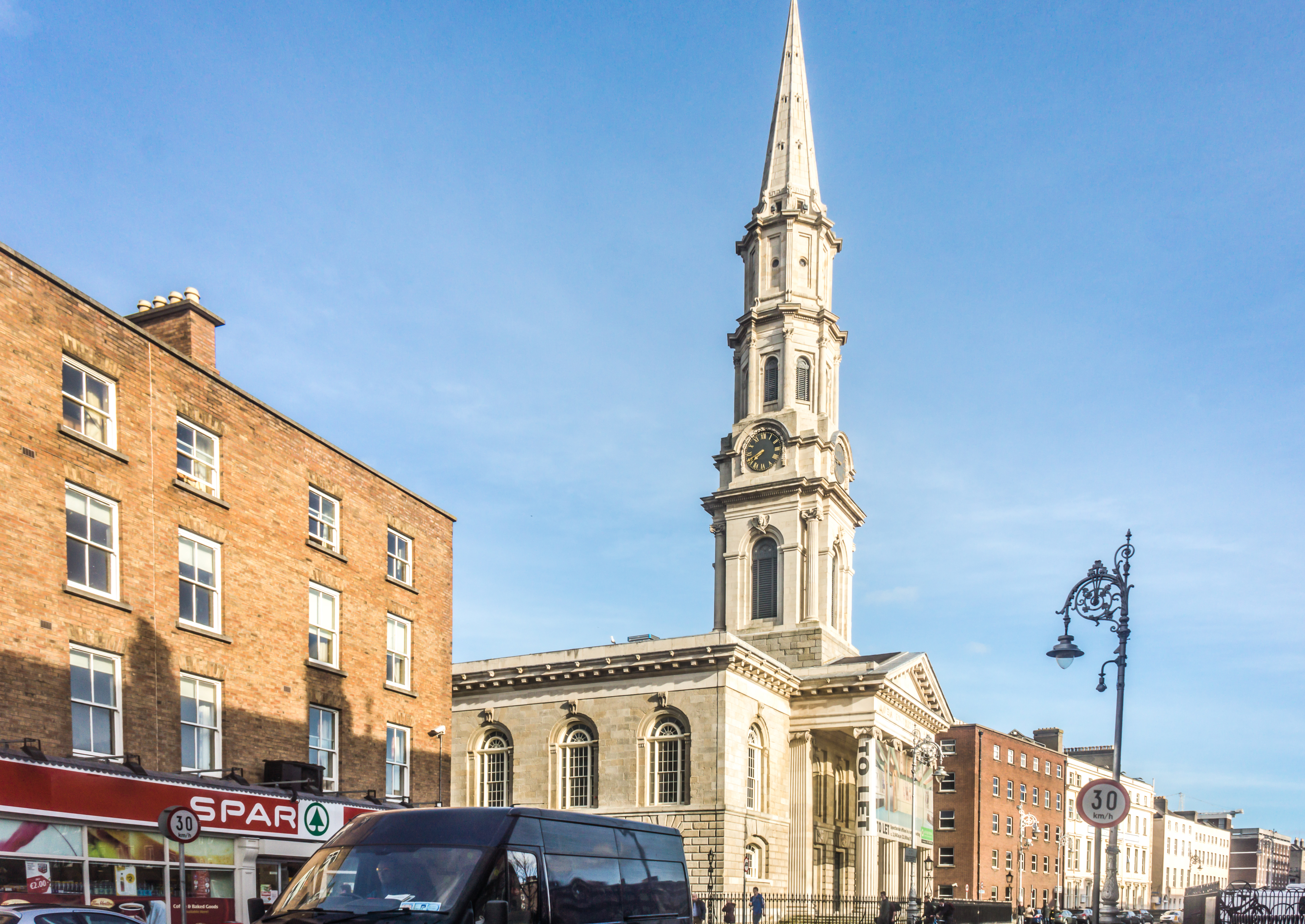

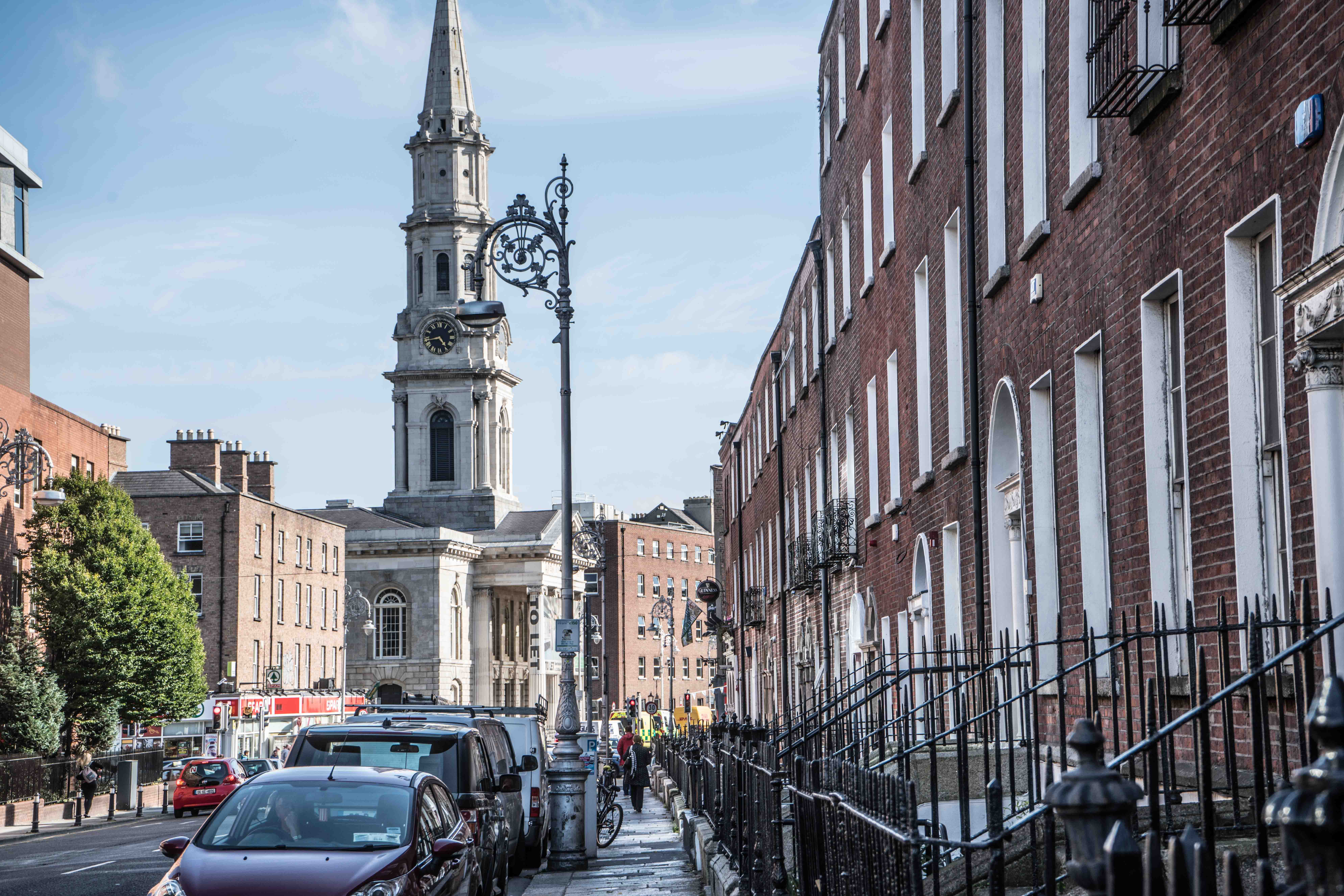

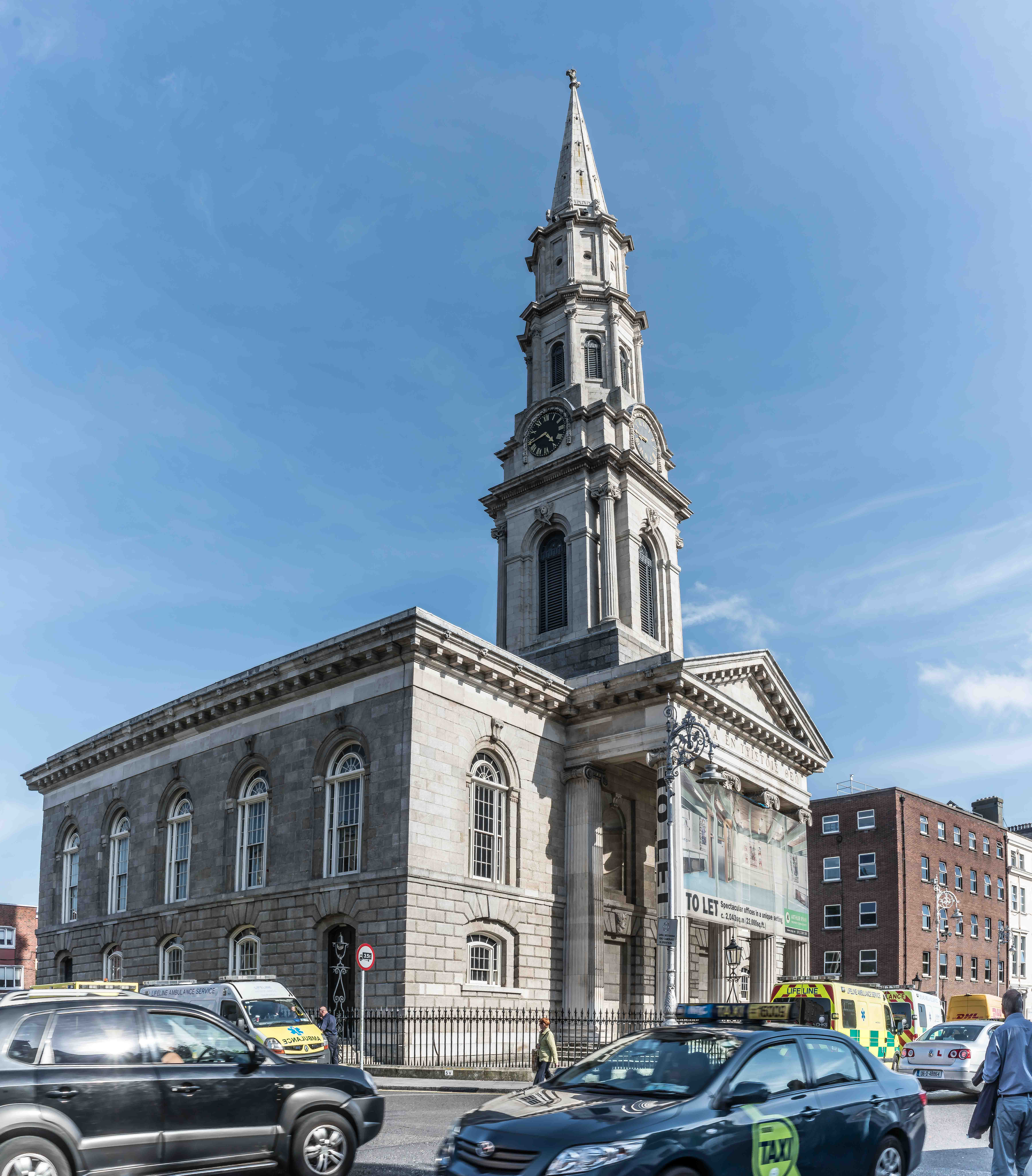

== Sources ==
- Gilbert, John (1854). A History of the City of Dublin. Oxford University Press.
- Wright, George Newenham (2005). An Historical Guide to the City of Dublin. Archived from the original on 31 October 2007.
- Curtis, Joe (1992). Times, Chimes and Charms of Dublin. Dublin: Verge Books.
