= William Conyngham Greene =

William Conyngham Greene may refer to:

- William Greene (dean of Christ Church Cathedral, Dublin) (1827–1910), Dean of Christ Church, Dublin
- Sir Conyngham Greene (1854–1934), British diplomat and nephew of the dean
