= Robert Warke =

Irish Anglican bishop (1930–2021)

Robert Alexander Warke (10 July 1930 – 12 January 2021) was Bishop of Cork, Cloyne and Ross from 1988 to 1998.

He was educated at The King's Hospital and Trinity College Dublin, and ordained deacon in 1953 and priest in 1954. His first post was a curacy at St Mark’s Newtownards. He was later Rector of Dunlavin (1964-67), then at the parish of Drumcondra and North Strand (1967-71), Rector of Zion Church Rathgar (1971-88), and finally (before his elevation to the episcopate) in 1980 Archdeacon of Dublin.

== Notes ==
Church of Ireland titles
Preceded by Samuel Greenfield Poyntz	Bishop of Cork, Cloyne and Ross; 1988 –1998	Succeeded by Paul Colton
