= St. Barnabas' Church, Dublin =

Protestant church in Dublin, Ireland

Coordinates: 53.3505967°N 6.2357746°W

St. Barnabas' Church was a Church of Ireland church on Upper Sheriff Street, East Wall, in Dublin's docklands. It was sometimes called the Mariners Church.

== History ==
The Parish was established in 1866 by Rev. John Grainger DD from St. Thomas Church, to serve those working on the Railway, and Docks, East Wall (then known as North Lotts) being its catchment area. The new church built in 1869 was designed by Alfred Jones, was consecrated on January 22, 1870. It was situated on Upper Sheriff Street, between East Road and Church Road (East). St Barnabas School was built on land adjoining the church.

Succeeding Rev. Grainger just before the new church was completed in 1869 was Rev William Daunt served as rector until 1872, when Rev. James Saul Fletcher (c. 1835–1917) took the role as Rector from 1872 until 1899, he resided in the St. Barnabas Parsonage, 30 Great Charles Street.

The writer Sean O'Casey, who lived on Abercorn Road, was a parishioner of St Barnabas Church from 1889 to 1919. O'Casey had great regard for a priest in the St. Barnabas, Rev. Edward Morgan Griffin BD MA, rector from 1899 to 1918, writing a biography of him, and also dedicating the second volume of his autobiography to Rev. Griffin. O'Casey taught Sunday school in St. Barnabas for three years.

Rector Rev. David Henry Hall (known as the Building Parson) who succeeded Rev. Griffin, set up St Barnabas Public Utility Society in 1919, to promote developing improved housing conditions in the area. The first development St Barnabas Gardens preserves the name and recognises the role Rev. Hall, the Society and the church played in housing. Other developments include Utility Row and Gardens, Seaview Avenue and Crescent Gardens and East Wall Road, in total about 200 houses were built by the Society.

Canon J Purser Short took over as rector in 1929 from Rev. Hall, and Canon Short was the last rector of the parish. In 1956 the parish, which had been affiliated to the St. Thomas parish, was merged with North Strand.

The church closed in 1965 and the parish joined North Strand (Waterloo Avenue) and Drumcondra parish to form the United Parish of Drumcondra, North Strand, and Saint Barnabas. North Strand was renamed North Strand and St. Barnabas officially, the plaque commemorating World War II was moved to North Strand, as was the Roll of Honour from St. Barnabas parish from the Great war. The building was demolished in 1969, a century after it was built. An 11-storey apartment block named Canon Hall (for Rev. David Henry Hall) replaced the church with a plaque on the wall commemorating the site of the former church. Part of the churchyard site now contains the Dublin branch of the Saudi Arabian Cultural Bureau.

The bell from the church (donated by Rector Daunt) is now in Church of Ireland, St. Pauls (French Church), Portarlington, County Laois.

== Rectors ==
- The Rev. Canon John Grainger DD MRIA - from St. Thomas's, set up new parish and Church (1866–1869)
- The Rev. William Daunt MA - appointed first rector of the new church (1869–1872)
- The Rev. James Saul Fletcher DD - (1872–1899)
- The Rev. Edward Morgan Griffin BD MA - (1899–1918)
- The Rev. David Henry Hall BD - (1918–1929)
- The Rev. Canon John Purser Short - (1929–1965)
