= Conyngham Greene =

British diplomat (1854–1934)

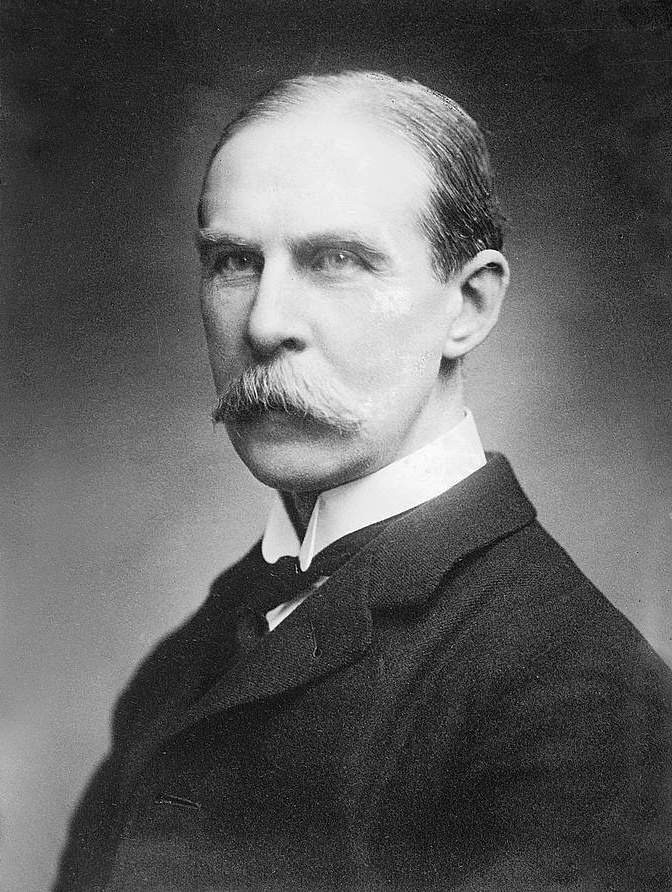

British Ambassador to Japan
- In office 1 December 1912 – April 1919
- Monarch: George V
- Prime Minister: H. H. Asquith; David Lloyd George
- Preceded by: Sir Claude Maxwell MacDonald
- Succeeded by: Sir Charles Eliot

Personal details
- Born: William Conyngham Greene; 29 October 1854 Dublin, Ireland
- Died: 30 June 1934 (aged 79)
- Spouse: Lady Lily Frances Stopford
- Parents: Richard Greene (father); Louisa Plunket (mother)
- Relatives: Richard Wilson Greene (grandfather); John Plunket, 3rd Baron Plunket (grandfather); William Greene (uncle)
- Occupation: Diplomat

Sir William Conyngham Greene, GCMG, KCB, PC (29 October 1854 – 30 June 1934) was a British diplomat who served as minister to Switzerland, Romania and Denmark, and as ambassador to Japan.

== Early life ==
William Conyngham Greene was born in Dublin, Ireland, son of Richard Jonas Greene, barrister and writer, and the Hon. Louisa Plunket, also a writer; his grandfathers were the eminent judge Richard Wilson Greene and John Plunket, 3rd Baron Plunket. He was named after his uncle William Greene, Dean of Christ Church Cathedral, Dublin, but did not use the name William as an adult. He was educated at Harrow School and Pembroke College, Oxford.

== Career ==
Greene entered the Foreign Office in 1877, was posted as Acting Third Secretary to Athens in 1880, and acted as Chargé d'Affaires at Stuttgart and Darmstadt 1883–87. He transferred formally to the Diplomatic Service (then separate from the Foreign Service) in 1877 and was posted as 2nd Secretary at The Hague 1889–91 and at Brussels 1891–93. He was then promoted to be Secretary of Legation at Tehran in 1893 and promoted again to be "HM Agent at Pretoria with rank of Chargé d'Affaires" in 1896.

Pretoria was then the capital of the Transvaal Republic, and on 9 October 1899 the Transvaal government handed to Conyngham Greene an ultimatum stating that if in 48 hours British troops did not retire from the border, a state of war would exist. The British government replied that the conditions imposed by the Transvaal were such that the British government could no longer discuss the subject, and the Second Boer War began on 11 October. On that day Conyngham Greene left Pretoria, and on his arrival at Cape Town a few days later he "was accorded a magnificent reception. A crowd of 3,000 persons who had gathered sang 'Rule, Britannia' and 'God Save the Queen'".

In 1901 Greene was appointed Minister to the Swiss Confederation. While stationed in Bern he was treasurer of an Appeal Fund set up in 1904 for building a new church, which became the Anglican church of Saint Ursula in Bern. He remained at Bern until December 1905 and was appointed Minister to Romania in January 1906. In January 1911 he was transferred to Copenhagen as Minister to Denmark where he stayed only two years. In December 1912 he was made a Privy Counsellor and posted as Ambassador to Japan. He was the King's representative at the enthronement of the Taishō Emperor in 1915.

According to Greene's obituary in the Times of London, "he remained in Tokyo until the end of the First World War and proved himself a great Ambassador. His open and genial manner won the confidence of the Japanese, and retained it throughout all the vicissitudes of the War and in spite of certain difficulties with the Ministry for Foreign Affairs in Tokyo. His departure in April 1919 was universally regretted." Sir Conyngham (as he had become) and Lady Lily Greene were among the passengers who landed from the Aquitania at Plymouth on 10 May 1919.

== Honours ==
Conyngham Greene was appointed a Companion of the Order of the Bath (CB) in the 1897 New Year Honours. On his return from South Africa he was promoted to Knight Commander of the Order (KCB) in the 1900 Queen's Birthday Honours – the list mentioned that he was "late British Agent at Pretoria". While serving in Japan he was appointed Knight Commander of the Order of St Michael and St George (KCMG) in the 1914 Birthday Honours. In 1917 he was made an honorary fellow of his old college, Pembroke College, Oxford.

== Personal life ==
In 1884, while at the Legation at Stuttgart, Conyngham Greene married Lady Lily Frances Stopford, daughter of the 5th Earl of Courtown. She died in 1950. They had four children, Barrington, Geoffrey, Kathleen, who was a well-known author of children's books, and Norah, who married Sir Hubert Brand, younger son of Henry Robert Brand, 2nd Viscount Hampden and died in 1924, leaving issue.

== Selected works ==
Some of Greene's writings were posthumously published.

- Foreign Office files for Japan and the Far East (1991)

== Notes ==
Diplomatic posts
Preceded by Frederick Robert St John	British Envoy to Switzerland; 1901–1905	Succeeded by Sir George Bonham, 2nd Baronet
Preceded by John Kennedy	British Envoy to Romania; 1906–1910	Succeeded by Walter Townley
Preceded by Hon. Sir Alan Johnstone	British Envoy to Denmark; 1911–1912	Succeeded by Sir Henry Lowther
Preceded by Sir Claude MacDonald	British Ambassador to Japan; 1912–1919	Succeeded by Sir Charles Eliot
