= James Walsh (Irish priest) =

Irish Anglican priest

James Hornidge Walsh (13 April 1837 – 4 September 1919) was an Irish Anglican priest who was Dean of Christ Church Cathedral, Dublin from 1908 to 1918.

He was born in Calvestown, near Tyrrellspass, County Westmeath, the son of Robert Walsh. He was educated at Elphin School, County Roscommon, and earned a scholarship to Trinity College, Dublin. After earning his B.A., was ordained in 1860 and earned an M.A. in 1864, B.D. in 1872 and eventually D.D.

He served as Assistant to Archbishop King's Professor of Divinity at Trinity College from 1877 to 1883. He held curacies in Dublin and Adare and incumbencies in Limerick. In 1883, when St Stephen's became a parish in its own right, Walsh was appointed its first rector and served there until entering the Deanery of Christ Church in 1908.

He died in Dublin South, aged 82.

Church of England titles
Preceded by William Conyngham Greene	Dean of Christ Church Cathedral, Dublin; 1908– 1918	Succeeded by Harry Vere White
