= Mariners' Church, Dún Laoghaire =

Former church in Dún Laoghaire, Ireland, now a museum

Coordinates: 53°17′32″N 6°7′55.4″W

Mariners' Church
- Protestant Episcopal Mariners' Church
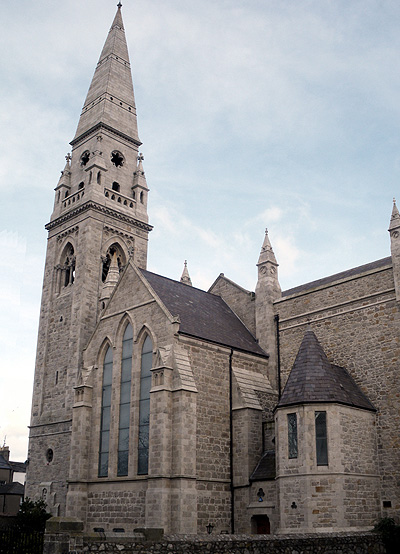
- Mariners' Church
- Location: Haigh Terrace, Dún Laoghaire
- Country: Ireland
- Denomination: Church of Ireland

History
- Founded: 1836
- Consecrated: 25 June 1843

Architecture
- Architect: Joseph Welland
- Completed: 1843
- Closed: Easter 1972

Specifications
- Length: 35.5 metres (116 ft)
- Width: 16.3 metres (53 ft)
- Height: 18 metres (59 ft)

The Mariners' Church is a former Church of Ireland church located in Haigh Terrace, near the centre of Dún Laoghaire town, southeast of Dublin city. It now houses the National Maritime Museum of Ireland.

== Early history ==
The church was built by subscription in 1836, in pursuance of a donation of £1,000 for its endowment, for seafarers as the "Protestant Episcopal Mariners' Church at Kingstown Harbour". Due to the increasing importance of Kingstown (as the town was then known) and its harbour, it was considered necessary to have a Church to look after the spiritual needs of officers and sailors. The church, designed by the architect Joseph Welland (1798–1860), was consecrated on 25 June 1843. This initial building consisted of just the nave and transepts. Richard Brooke, the first chaplain, described it as "large and gaunt and lofty and ugly a satire on taste, a libel of all ecclesiastical rule, mocking at proportion and symmetry". From 1862 until 1867, the building was improved by the addition of the spire and lancet windows. The spire, designed by Raffles Browne, was added in 1865. The chancel was added in 1884. It was then the principal Church of Ireland church in the town. It depended for its upkeep to a large extent on voluntary subscriptions, donations, bequests and the results of fund-raising efforts.

== Later history ==
Much needed renovations were carried out in 1870, after several fund-raising efforts by the parishioners. However, further work was needed by 1884, to be carried out by Bolton of Rathmines under the direction of architect Thomas Drew (1838–1910). During this work, an accident occurred on 10 September. Scaffolding collapsed when two men were plastering the ceiling, 50 feet (15.2 m) above ground. One, Hemp, died soon afterwards; the other was seriously injured. The church re-opened on 14 October 1884. In the mid-20th century, the congregation dwindled, and the church closed for worship at Easter 1972.

== Maritime Museum ==
Shortly after the church closed, the Maritime Institute of Ireland showed an interest in acquiring the church for use as a museum. In 1974 a lease was signed between Church of Ireland officials and the Maritime Institute. The National Maritime Museum of Ireland was opened by President Patrick Hillery in 1978. In 2007 the Institute bought the building. Renovations were completed in 2011 which included improvements to the roof, interior, and electrical systems.

== Notable parishioners ==
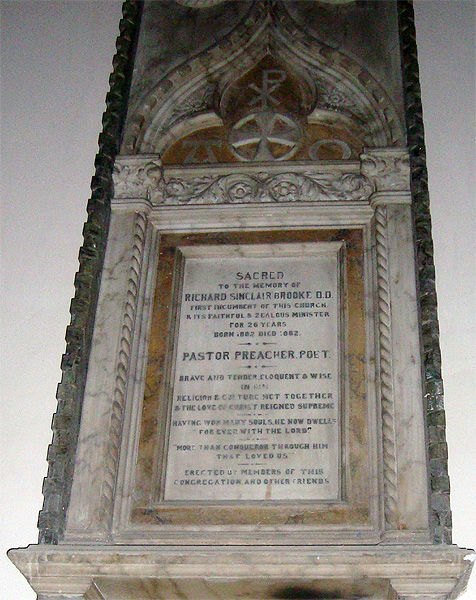
Memorial in the church to Richard Brooke.

- Rev. Richard Sinclair Brooke (1802–1882), from County Donegal, was the first incumbent of The Mariners Church. He married Anna, daughter of the Rev. T. Stopford. He was the father of Stopford Augustus Brooke the clergyman and writer, whose son was Stopford Brooke the Liberal politician.
- S. Allen Windle, from Shropshire, was Chaplain of the church until 1875, when he became Vicar of Market Rasen, in England. He died there in January 1880, aged 52, and was interred in Mount Jerome Cemetery. He was succeeded as Chaplain by Rev. W E Burroughs.
- Captain William Hutchison (1793–1881), from County Kildare, first harbour master of Kingstown, who also acted as coxswain of the lifeboat. Over his long years of service he won the RNLI Gold and Silver medals for saving lives at sea.
- Peter Marshall (died January 1890), had been secretary to the trustees of the Mariners’ Church, and secretary of the Property Defence Association from its inception. He was a well-known member of the Masonic Order and Orange Order.

== Chaplains and Incumbents ==
- 1836–1862 Richard Sinclair Brookes
- 1862–1876 Samuel Allen Windle
- 1876–1895 William Edward Burroughs
- 1895–1911 John Lindsey Darling
- 1912–1921 Herbert Brownlow Kennedy
- 1922–1923 Albert Edward Hughes
- 1924–1959 George Ashton Chamberlain
