= North Strand Church (Church of Ireland) =

Church in Dublin

North Strand Church of Ireland
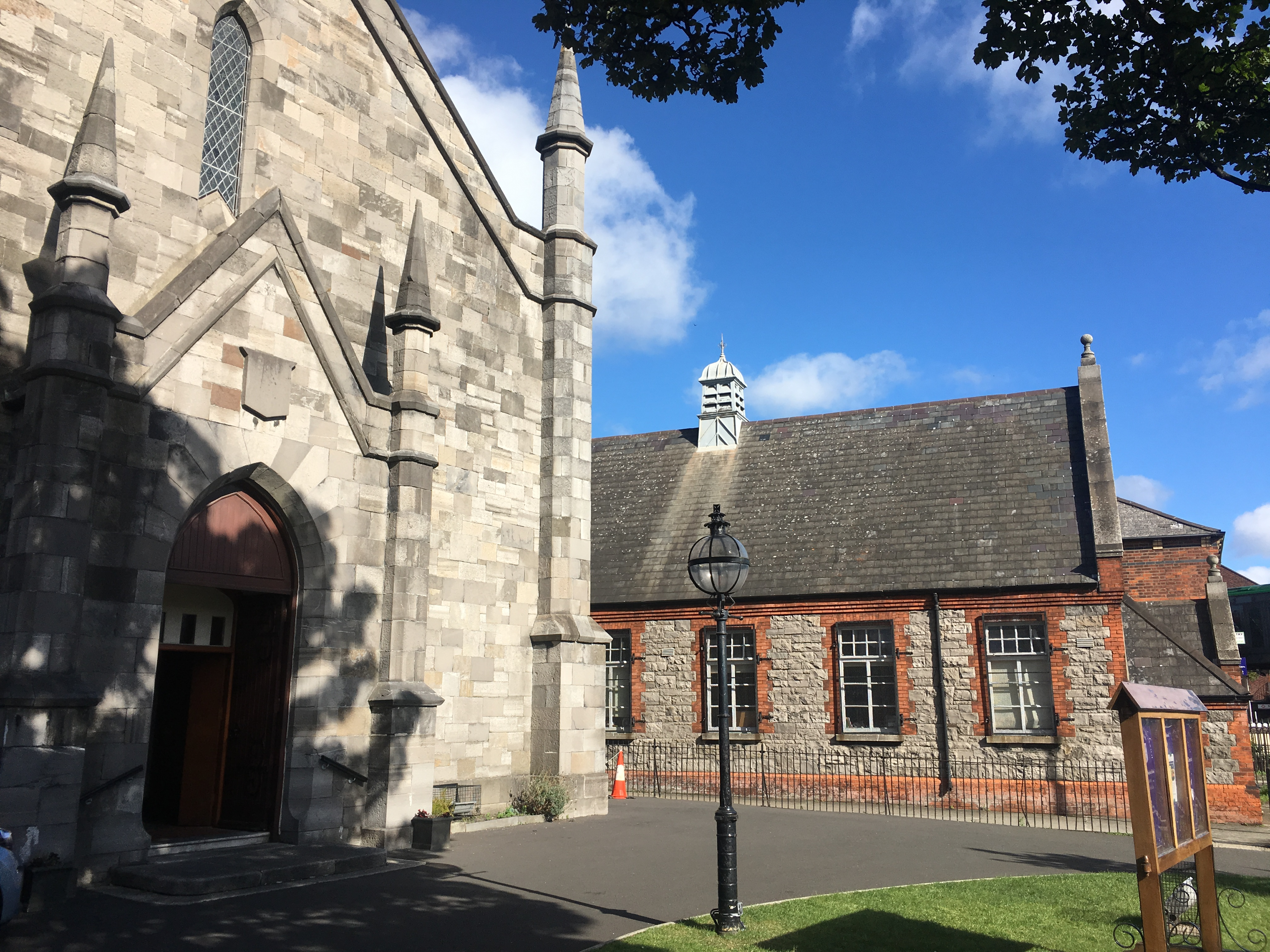
- North Strand Church with St. Columba's National School in the background
- North Strand Church of Ireland
- 53.3584946°N 6.2424395°W
- Location: North Strand, Dublin
- Country: Ireland
- Denomination: Church of Ireland

History
- Founded: 1786

Architecture
- Architect: Joseph Welland

Administration
- Province: Province of Dublin
- Diocese: Diocese of Dublin and Glendalough
- Parish: United Parish of Drumcondra, North Strand, and Saint Barnabas.

Clergy
- Rector: Garth Bunting

North Strand Church is a Church of Ireland church on North Strand and Waterloo Avenue in Dublin, Ireland. The original church was established in 1786. It is now part of the United Parish of Drumcondra, North Strand, and Saint Barnabas. St. Columba's National School, which was established in 1787, is on the same grounds and affiliated with the church.

== History ==
=== Associated Parishes ===
North Strand parish merged with the Parish of Drumcondra in 1896. When St. Barnabas' Church, Dublin on Sheriff Street closed in 1965 it was merged with North Strand. The churches at Drumcondra and North Strand now serve the combined parishes. Since 2017 North Strand and Drumcondra churches also serve the Anglican communities from St. George and St. Thomas parishes.

=== Buildings ===
The original school and chapel were situated on the corner of North Strand and Spring Garden Street. The foundation stone for a new Episcopal Chapel on the current North Strand site was laid on 7 September 1836 by Rev Charles Henry Minchin; the architect was Joseph Welland. Reconstruction work on the old school building was carried out in 1943–44, and the buildings were reopened by Éamon de Valera.

The church contains memorials to parishioners lost in the Great War, and the Roll of Honour form it, it also contains the Roll of Honour from the St Barnabas parish from the Great War, after the Church of St Barnabas was demolished in 1969.

=== Clergy ===
In the nineteenth century, the church would have been considered and referred to as an Episcopal Chapel, with a number of clergy on the evangelical wing involved in the church, including Rev. Dr Singer and Rev. Krause, (and Arthur Guinness) who were trustees of the church at the time. The Rev. Richard Hemphill AM, served as chaplain to the church. Rev. Ernest Lewis-Crosby was rector from 1904 to 1914. In 2016, Canon Roy Byrne was succeeded by Rev. Garth Bunting as rector.

=== Mothers' Union ===
The first Mothers' Union branch was established in Raheny Parish in 1887, with a branch being established in North Strand School in 1895. The Mothers' Union remains active in the parish.

=== Nine Lessons and Carols ===
On Christmas Eve 1914, David Wilson organised the first service of Nine Lessons and Carols in Ireland in North Strand Church.

== See also ==
- Church of John the Baptist, Drumcondra Church
- St. Barnabas' Church, Dublin (closed 1965)
- National Inventory of Architectural Heritage entries for St Columba's Infant School Hall, St Columbas National School and North Strand Church.
