= Dermot Dunne =

Irish dean

Dermot Patrick Martin Dunne is the current and, by some counts, 35th Dean of Christ Church Cathedral, Dublin.

Dean Dunne is a native of Mallow county Cork. Having completed his primary and secondary education, he was accepted by the bishop of Cloyne for training for ordination. He entered the Seninary at St Patrick’s College Maynooth in 1978 where he pursued qualifications in both philosophy and Theology. Dean Dunne was ordained deacon in 1983 and Priest in 1984. His academic pursuits include diplomas in both philosophy and theology, a Bachelor of Arts degree from Dublin City University and a master's degree in Applied Christian Spirituality from Dublin City University.

Dean Dunne served as a curate in the parish of Milford, county Cork for six years. In 1990 he was appointed as hospital chaplain to the Whittington Hospital London and subsequently served in three parishes including: St Mellitus Parish, Tollington Park, St George’s cathedral Southwark and St Mary’s Church, Caduggan Street, Chelsea. Whilst in London Dean Dunne graduated as a psychotherapist from the Chiron Centre in Ealing, London. In 1995 dean Dunne stepped aside from active ministry and worked with the Environment Council London and the Safe Start Foundation, London.

On transferring his ministry to the Anglican Communion, in 1999 dean Dunne was appointed Dean's Vicar of Christ Church Cathedral, Dublin. Having served his title there until 2001, dean Dunne was appointed incumbent of the Crosspatrick and Carnew Group of parishes in county Wicklow. During his incumbency he was appointed Precentor of Ferns and subsequently Archdeacon of Ferns before his appointment as Dean of Christ Church Cathedral Dublin in 2008. Dean Dunne is married to Celia, daughter of James and Dorothy Burl late of Hemel Hempstead, London.

== Notes ==
Religious titles
Preceded by Robert Desmond Harman	Dean of Christ Church Cathedral, Dublin; 2008–present	Succeeded by Current incumbent
