= Ernest Lewis-Crosby =

Ernest Henry Cornwall Lewis-Crosby (ca 1864 – 1961) was a Church of Ireland (Anglican) priest and author.

He was educated at Trinity College, Dublin. His first post was as a curate at Christ Church, Leeson Park, Dublin. After this he was head of the Church of Ireland Mission to the Jews then Rector of, successively, Drumcondra and North Strand parish (1904–14), Rathmines (1914–1924) and Stillorgan (1924-38). In 1938, he became Dean of Christ Church Cathedral, Dublin, a post he held until his death on 18 May 1961.

He had three sons and two daughters: Robert Cornwall Lewis-Crosby, Edith Patricia Charity Lewis-Crosby, John Ernest Cornwall Lewis-Crosby (who became Secretary of the National Trust of Northern Ireland), Francis Gabriel Cornwall (who changed his surname upon inheriting his uncle's homestead), and Hilda Florence Harriet Lewis-Crosby.

He helped establish the Church of Ireland Divinity Hostel in 1913, by allowing his property on Mountjoy Square to be used by the Hostel rent free for a number of years.

== Notes ==
Church of Ireland titles
Preceded by Herbert Brownlow Kennedy	Dean of Christ Church Cathedral, Dublin; 1938– 1961	Succeeded by Norman David Emerson
