= Cecil De Pauley =

William Cecil de Pauley (1893 – 30 March 1968) was a Church of Ireland bishop and author in the 20th century.

== Education and Ministry ==
De Pauley was born in Portrush and educated at the Coleraine Academical Institution and Trinity College, Dublin. He graduated in 1914 with a gold medal in mental and moral philosophy and, after ordination was a curate at Enniscorthy and Booterstown before becoming professor of systematic theology at St. John's College, University of Manitoba in Canada in 1920.

He returned to Ireland in 1926 to take up the incumbencies at St Peter's Athlone where he served for four years and St John's Sligo where he served for four more years before becoming professor of systematic theology at Trinity College, Toronto from 1932 to 1939. He was then the rector of St Matthias' Dublin. He was Dean of St Patrick's Cathedral, Dublin from 1950 to 1958.

== Episcopal ministry ==
In 1958 he was appointed Bishop of Cashel and Emly, Waterford and Lismore and consecrated in Armagh in a rare joint episcopal consecration, the other bishop being Alan Buchanan (bishop).

In the 1960s he took small but important steps in ecumenical relations attending, for example, the Requiem Mass in Feb 1965 for the deceased Catholic Bishop of Waterford and Lismore Daniel Cohalan (bishop of Waterford and Lismore), the first time an Anglican bishop attended any ceremony in Waterford's Catholic cathedral.

He was still the diocese's bishop when he died on 30 March 1968 at the age of 75.

Church of Ireland titles
Preceded by David Frederick Ruddell Wilson	Dean of St Patrick's Cathedral, Dublin; 1950–1958	Succeeded by John Ward Armstrong
Preceded by Thomas Arnold Harvey	Bishop of Cashel, Emly, Waterford and Lismore; 1958–1968	Succeeded by John Ward Armstrong
