= Des Harman =

Irish Anglican cleric

Robert Desmond Harman (20 June 1941 – 18 December 2007) was Dean of Christ Church Cathedral, Dublin from 2004 until 2007.

Harman was educated at Sligo Grammar School and Trinity College, Dublin. He was ordained in 1967 and his first post was as a curate in Taney Parish. After this he was successively Rector of Santry then Milltown before becoming dean.

== Notes ==
hardly
Preceded by John Thomas Farquhar Paterson	Dean of Christ Church Cathedral, Dublin; 2004–2007	Succeeded by Dermot Patrick Martin Dunne
