= Tom Salmon (priest) =

Thomas Noel Desmond Cornwall Salmon (5 February 1913 – 20 July 2013) was the dean of Christ Church Cathedral, Dublin.

He was educated at Trinity College, Dublin, and ordained in 1938. After curacies in Bangor, Belfast and Larne, he was clerical vicar at Christ Church Cathedral, Dublin. He was an incumbent at Rathfarnham (1945–50); Carrickmines (1950–62); and St Ann, Dublin (1962–67) before his appointment as dean.

== Notes ==
Religious titles
Preceded by Norman David Emerson	Dean of Christ Church Cathedral, Dublin; 1967 – 1989	Succeeded by John Thomas Farquhar Paterson
