= Herbert Kennedy =

Herbert Brownlow Kennedy (26 May 1863 – 28 May 1939) was Dean of Christ Church Cathedral, Dublin from 1921 to 1938.

Kennedy was the son of the Very Reverend T. Le Ban Kennedy, Dean of Clogher from 1874 to 1887. He was educated at The Royal School, Armagh and Trinity College, Dublin. After being a curate at St Ann's Dublin he was an incumbent at Holywood, Naas, St Andrew's Dublin and the Mariners' Church (in what was then called Kingstown, now Dún Laoghaire), before his appointment as dean.

== Notes ==
Religious titles
Preceded by Harry Vere White	Dean of Christ Church Cathedral, Dublin; 1921– 1938	Succeeded by Ernest Henry Cornwall Lewis-Crosby
