= St. Thomas's Church (old), Dublin =

Church building in Dublin, Ireland

Coordinates: 53°21′8.19″N 6°15′33.4″W

St. Thomas's Church
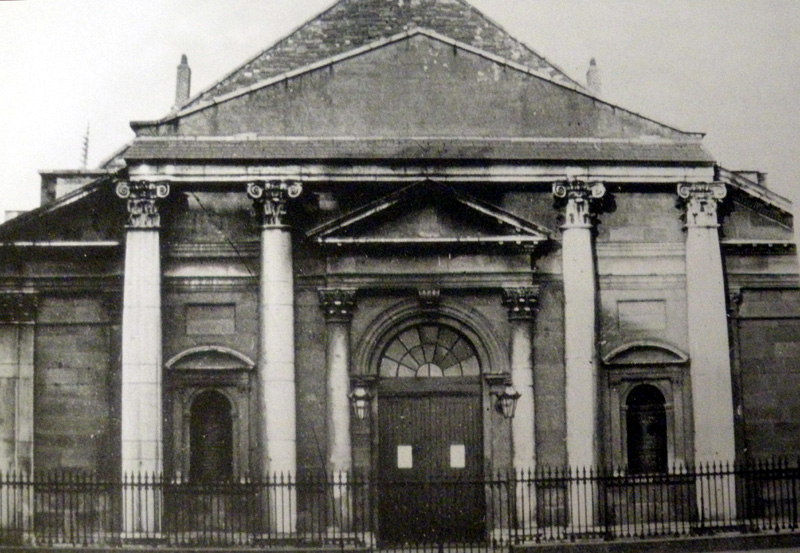
- The church about 1890

- Location: Marlborough Street, Dublin
- Country: Ireland
- Denomination: Church of Ireland

History
- Status: Parish church
- Founded: 1762; 264 years ago (building began 1758)
- Dedication: St Thomas

Architecture
- Architect: John Smith
- Architectural type: Palladian
- Groundbreaking: 1758
- Completed: 1762; 264 years ago
- Closed: 1922; 104 years ago
- Demolished: 1926; 100 years ago

Administration
- Diocese: Dublin (and Glendalough)
- Parish: St Thomas

St Thomas's Church in Marlborough Street, Dublin was a Church of Ireland parish church. It was replaced by a new church, St. Thomas's Church, Cathal Brugha Street, Dublin, in 1930.

== The church ==
=== Establishment ===
St Thomas's Church was built in 1758–62 in Marlborough Street when the parish of St. Mary's was divided to cope with increased population. The architect of this church (and of St. Catherine's in Thomas Street) was John Smyth. The design is modelled on Palladio's Il Redentore in Venice. £2000 was granted by Parliament for the building of the church, and later another thousand pounds to finish it off. At the time it was considered to have the most beautiful facade of any church in the city, built in the Palladian style similar to St Catherine's Church on Thomas Street. It was opened for worship in 1762.

=== Operation ===
In 1866 Rev. John Grainger from St. Thomas's, moved to the new Church in Sheriff Street, East Wall St. Barnabas' Church, Dublin.

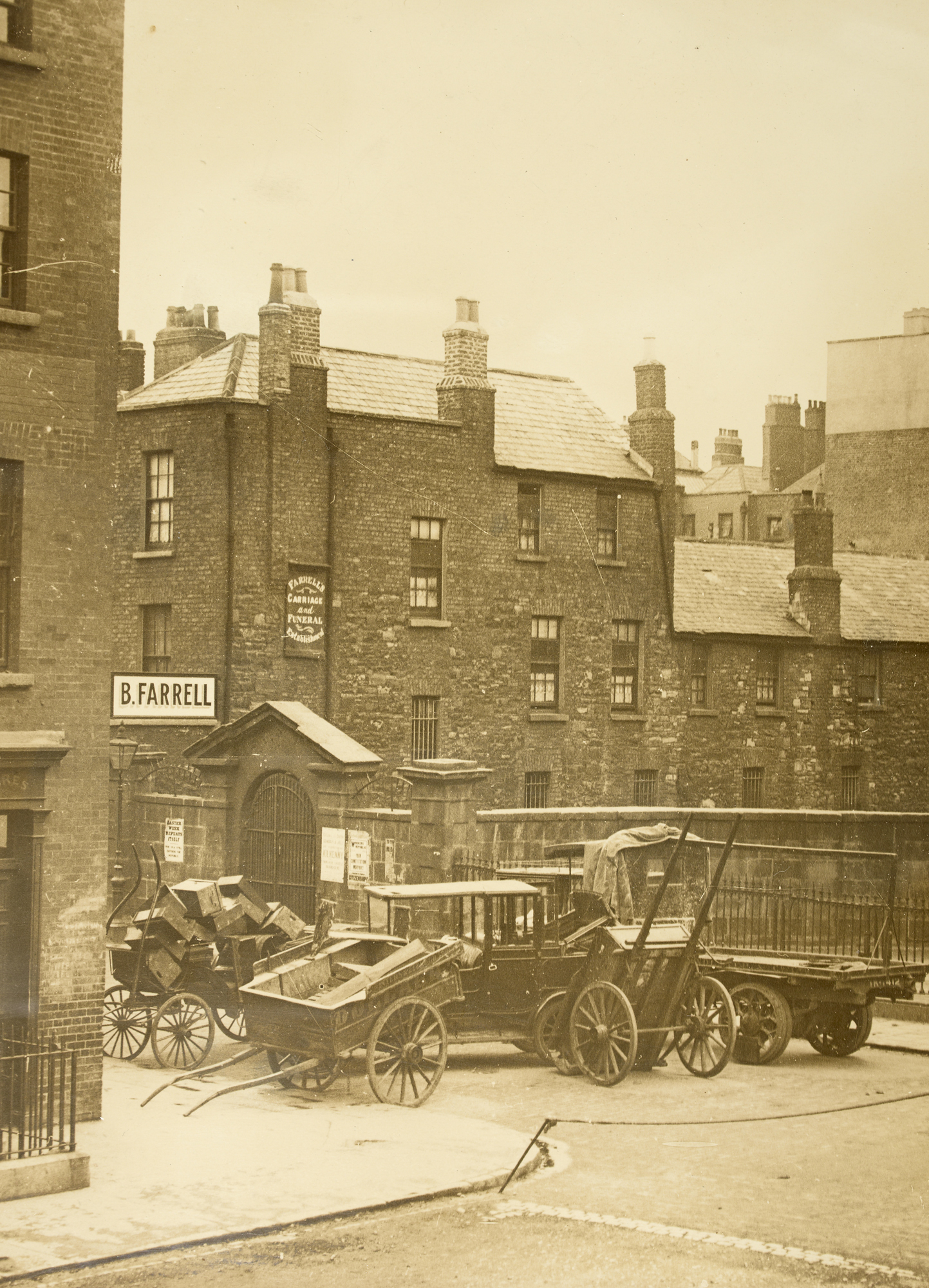
A barricade outside St. Thomas' Church gate just before it was destroyed by fire in 1922

=== Loss and replacement ===
The church was gutted by a fire in July 1922. This fire, which destroyed most of Upper Sackville Street (now O'Connell Street), occurred during the Civil War. Although the main structure survived, the opportunity was taken to extend Gloucester Street (now Sean Mac Dermott Street) up to O'Connell Street, and the church had to be removed in 1926 to enable this. The new St Thomas's Church was erected on the site of the former parochial hall, on an "island" site in Cathal Brugha Street, in 1930. The foundation stone of the former church is retained in the new St Thomas's Church.

== The parish ==
There were 17,108 inhabitants in St. Thomas's parish in 1825.

== Clergy ==
- Rev. Charles Stuart Stanford DD, (1805–1873) served as Rector(1852–1872)
- Rev. John Grainger DD, from St. Thomas's, moved to East Wall to create St. Barnabas' Church, Dublin.

== Burials ==
- Edward Stratford, 2nd Earl of Aldborough

== Sources ==
- Cosgrave, Ephraim McDowel; Strangways, L.R. (1908). A Dictionary of Dublin (2nd ed.). Dublin: Sealy, Bryers and Walkers.
- Gilbert, John (1854). A History of the City of Dublin. Oxford: Oxford University.
- George Newenham Wright (2005). "An Historical Guide to the City of Dublin". Online book. Archived from the original on 31 October 2007.
- Craig, Maurice (1969). Dublin: 1660-1860. Dublin: Allen Figgis.
- Hood, Susan (1 July 2021). "St Thomas's Church, Dublin: Online Contemporary Photographic Exhibition Showcases its Foundation in 1930". Church of Ireland Archive of the Month.
