= Dean of Christ Church Cathedral, Dublin =

Church of Ireland official

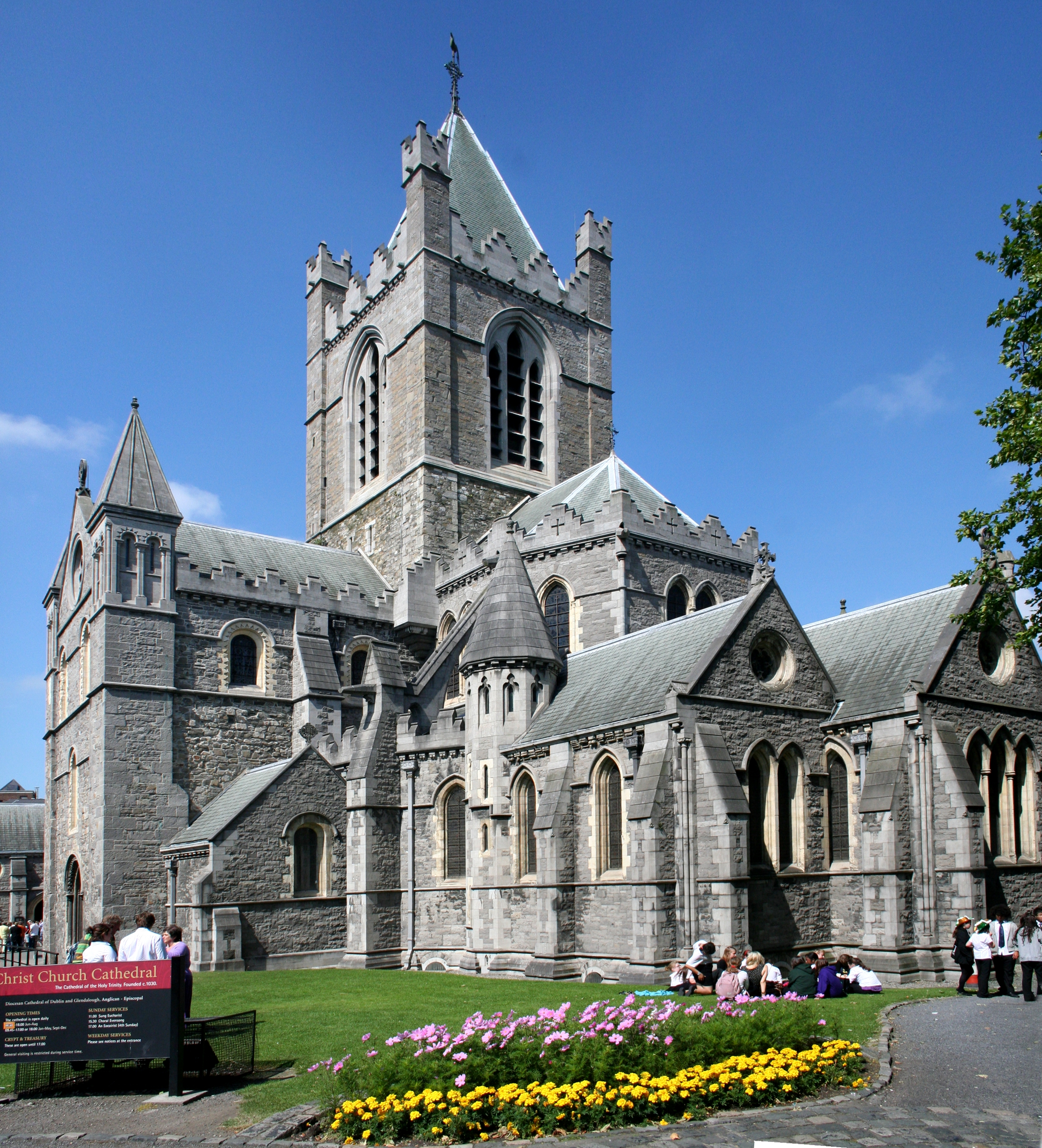
Christ Church Cathedral

The Dean of Christ Church Cathedral, Dublin is dean and head of the chapter of the Cathedral of the Holy Trinity, commonly called Christ Church Cathedral, which is the cathedral church of the United Diocese of Dublin and Glendalough in the Church of Ireland. The dean is appointed by the Church of Ireland Archbishop of Dublin. Aspects of the cathedral administration are overseen by the Cathedral Board, which the Dean chairs with both a regular and a casting vote.

The Prior of Christ Church or Prior of the Holy Trinity was the predecessor of the office of dean. As part the dissolution of the Irish monasteries, the Arrosian abbey attached to the cathedral — the Priory of the Holy Trinity founded by archbishop Laurence O'Toole — was dissolved and its canons became officers of the new cathedral chapter, by Royal Warrant of 12 December 1539. From the Williamite Revolution until 1846, the Deanship of Christ Church (endowment £5200) was held in commendam by the Bishop of Kildare (endowment £150). In 1846, the diocese of Kildare was merged with that of Dublin, and the office of Dean of Christ Church Cathedral was combined with that of Dean of St Patrick's Cathedral. (The other Church of Ireland cathedral in Dublin, St Patrick's Cathedral is a "national cathedral" rather than a diocesan cathedral.) After the disestablishment of the Church of Ireland, the Deanship of St Patrick's was separated while that of Christ Church was filled by the Archbishop of Dublin. In 1889, a separate Dean of Christ Church was reinstated.

== Residence ==
In 1731, Dean Welbore Ellis arranged for a dedicated Deanery house to be constructed on Fishamble Street close to the cathedral. The house was occupied by Ellis and Charles Cobbe however George Stone deemed the house to be unsuitable in 1743 and moved to the churche's estate in Glasnevin whereupon the house was never again occupied by any of the deans.

== Priors ==
- c.1171-c.1190 – Gervase (Gervasius), first formal record 1177
- c.1190-c.1196 – Columbanus
- c.1196-c.1201 – Thomas
- c.1201-c.1205 – ?
- c.1205-c.1208 – Robert
- c.1208-c.1220 – W(illiam le Gros?)
- c.1220-c.1225 – Bernard
- c.1225-c.1235 – Roger
- c.1235-c.1244 – Philip (de Cruce?)
- c.1244–1252 – Robert de Stanford
- 1252-c.1265? – John?

There may have been a Robert in office in 1260, and a Fulk around 1262

- c.1265-c.1279 – William de Gran, first formal record 1270
- c.1279-c.1292 – Adam de la More
- c.1292-c.1296 – John de Exeter (or de Oxford?)
- c.1296–1301 – Adam de Balsham, elected Archbishop of Dublin in 1299 by the Cathedral chapter, while the chapter of St Patrick's Cathedral chose another candidate, Thomas de Chaddesworth, but both were refused confirmation as Archbishop by the Pope, and forced to stand down in favour of Richard de Ferings. Removed from office 1301.
- 1301–1313 – Henry de la War(r)e de Bristol
- 1313–1320 – John Pocock? (or possibly a John Toppe around 1313, and Pocock or Pecock by 1317)
- 1320–1326 – Hugh (le Jeune) de Sutton
- 1326–1331 – Robert de Gloucester
- 1331–1337 – Roger Goioun
- 1337–1343 – Gilbert de Bolyniop
- 1343–1346 – Simon de Ludegate
- 1346–1349 – Robert de Hereforde
- 1349–1382 – Stephen de Derby
- 1382–1397 – Robert Lokynton, first formal record 1388
- 1397–1409 – James de Redenesse
- 1409–1438 – Nicholas Staunton
- 1438–1459 – William Denys, first formal record 1443
- 1459–1474 – William Lynton, first formal record 1463
- 1474–1489 – Thomas Harrold
- 1489–1499 – David Wynchester (or Winchester)
- 1499–1519 – Richard Skyrrett
- 1519–1537 – William Hassard
- 1537–1539 – Robert Castle or Castell (alias Paynswick or Painswick)

== Deans ==
- 1539–1543 – Robert Paynswick
- 1543–1565 – Thomas Lockwood, previously Archdeacon of Meath
- 1565–1595 – John Garvey (afterwards Bishop of Kilmore, 1585 retaining Christ Church deanery in commendam )
- 1595–1618 – Jonas (James) Wheeler (afterwards Bishop of Ossory, 1613 retaining Christ Church deanery in commendam)
- 1618–1634 – Randolph Barlow (afterwards Archbishop of Tuam, 1629 retaining Christ Church deanery in commendam)
- 1634–1639 – Henry Tilson (afterwards Bishop of Elphin, 1639)
- 1639–1644 – James Margetson (afterwards Archbishop of Dublin, 1660)
- 1644–1644 – Patrick Cahill
- 1644–1661 – William Berrey
- 1661–1666 – Robert Mossom (afterwards Bishop of Derry, 1666)
- 1666–1677 – John Parry (afterwards Bishop of Ossory, 1672)
- 1677–1688 – William Moreton (afterwards Bishop of Kildare, 1682)
- 1688–1691 – Alexius Stafford (Catholic, Jacobite parliament MP)
- 1691–1705 – William Moreton (also Bishop of Kildare)
- 1705–1731 – Welbore Ellis (also Bishop of Kildare) (afterwards Bishop of Meath, 1732)
- 1731–1743 – Charles Cobbe (also Bishop of Kildare) (afterwards Archbishop of Dublin, 1743)
- 1743–1745 – George Stone (also Bishop of Kildare) (afterwards Bishop of Derry, 1745)
- 1745–1761 – Thomas Fletcher (also Bishop of Kildare)
- 1761–1765 – Richard Robinson, 1st Baron Rokeby (also Bishop of Kildare)
- 1765–1790 – Charles Jackson (also Bishop of Kildare)
- 1790–1804 – George Lewis Jones (also Bishop of Kildare)
- 1804–1846 – Charles Dalrymple Lindsay (also Bishop of Kildare)
- 1846–1864 – Henry Pakenham (also Dean of St Patrick's Cathedral, 1843-1863)
- 1864–1872 – John West (also Dean of St Patrick's Cathedral, 1864-1889)
- 1872–1884 – Richard Chenevix Trench (also Archbishop of Dublin, 1863-1884)
- 1884–1887 – William Plunket, 4th Baron Plunket (also Archbishop of Dublin, 1884-1897)
- 1887–1908 – William C. Greene, Canon
- 1908–1918 – James Hornidge Walsh, previously Rector of St. Stephen's, and Canon from 1893
- 1918–1921 – Harry Vere White
- 1921–1938 – Herbert Brownlow Kennedy
- 1938–1962 – Ernest Henry Cornwall Lewis-Crosby
- 1962–1966 – Norman David Emerson
- 1967–1989 – Thomas Noel Desmond Cornwall Salmon
- 1989–2004 – John Thomas Farquhar Paterson, previously Vicar of St Bartholomew's Church, Dublin and Dean of St Brigid's Cathedral Kildare, died 2005
- 2004–2007 – Robert Desmond Harman
- 2008–2026 – Dermot Patrick Martin Dunne, previously Archdeacon of Ferns.
- 2026 - Thomas O'Brien, formerly rector of Crinken church.

== See also ==
- Deans of St. Patrick's Cathedral, Dublin

== Sources ==
- Mervyn Archdall, Monasticon Hibernicum, ed. Patrick F. Moran (2 vols, Dublin, W.B. Kelly, 1873), ii, 15-16, 'A List of Deans of Christ Church'.
- William Butler, The cathedral church of the Holy Trinity Dublin (Christ Church): a description of its fabric, and a brief history of the foundation, and subsequent changes (London, 1901), Appendix: 'List of priors and deans 1170-1901'
- Poster headed Cathedral of Dublin: the ancient priory church of the holy Trinity commonly called Christ Church (Dublin, 1908)
- J. B. Leslie, 'Fasti of Christ Church cathedral, Dublin' (Representative Church Body Library, Mississippi 61/2/2 [n.d., c.1939]), 56-71.
- G. J. Hand, 'The two cathedrals of Dublin: internal organisation and mutual relations, to the middle of the fourteenth century' (M.A. and Travelling Studentship in History thesis, National University of Ireland, 1954), 147-9.
- [Stuart Kinsella,] 'Priors and deans' in Kenneth Milne (ed.), Christ Church cathedral Dublin: a history (Dublin: Four Courts Press, 2000), 391-2.
- Church of Ireland Church of Ireland website (August 2007).
