= John Paterson (priest) =

John Thomas Farquhar Paterson (21 December 1938 – 9 September 2005) was an Anglican priest and author.

Paterson was born in Portadown, educated at Portadown College and Trinity College, Dublin, Ireland. He was ordained in 1963 and his first posts were curacies in Dungannon and Dublin. After this he was successively priest in charge of St Mark's Dublin, and also assistant chaplain of Trinity College, Dublin; Vicar of St Bartholomew with Christ Church, Leeson Park, Dublin; Dean of Kildare (1974–1989); and a lecturer in pastoral liturgy at the Church of Ireland Theological College. He became Dean of Christ Church Cathedral, Dublin, in 1989 a post he held for 15 years.

== Notes ==
Religious titles
Preceded by Thomas Noel Desmond Cornwall Salmon	Dean of Christ Church Cathedral, Dublin; 1989–2004	Succeeded by Robert Desmond Harman
