= Old Moore's Almanac =

Almanac first published in 1764

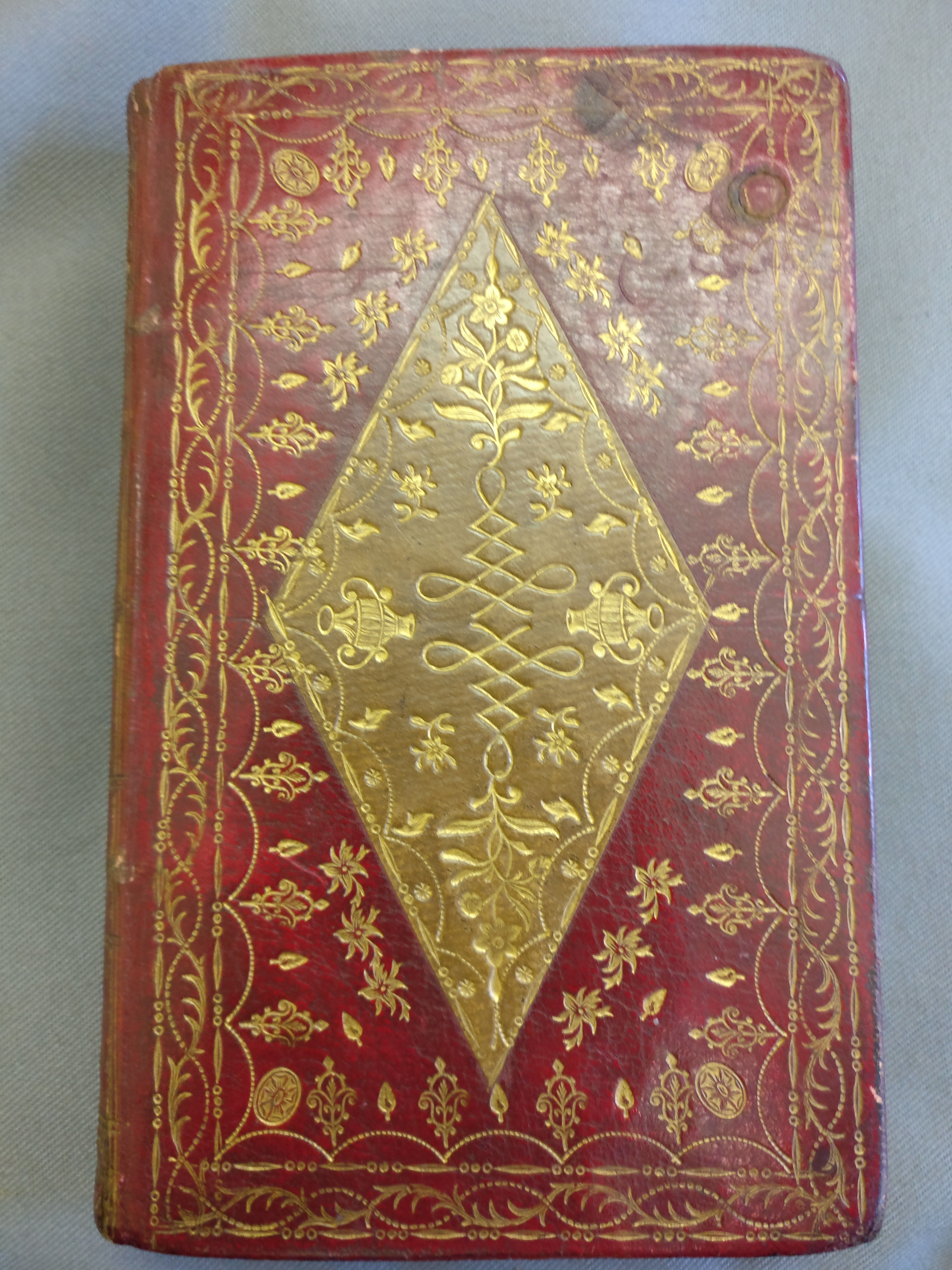
The Old Moore's Almanac started its life as the 'Irish Merlin' in 1764. This is the cover of the 1792 Irish Merlin, it can be found at the National Library of Ireland.

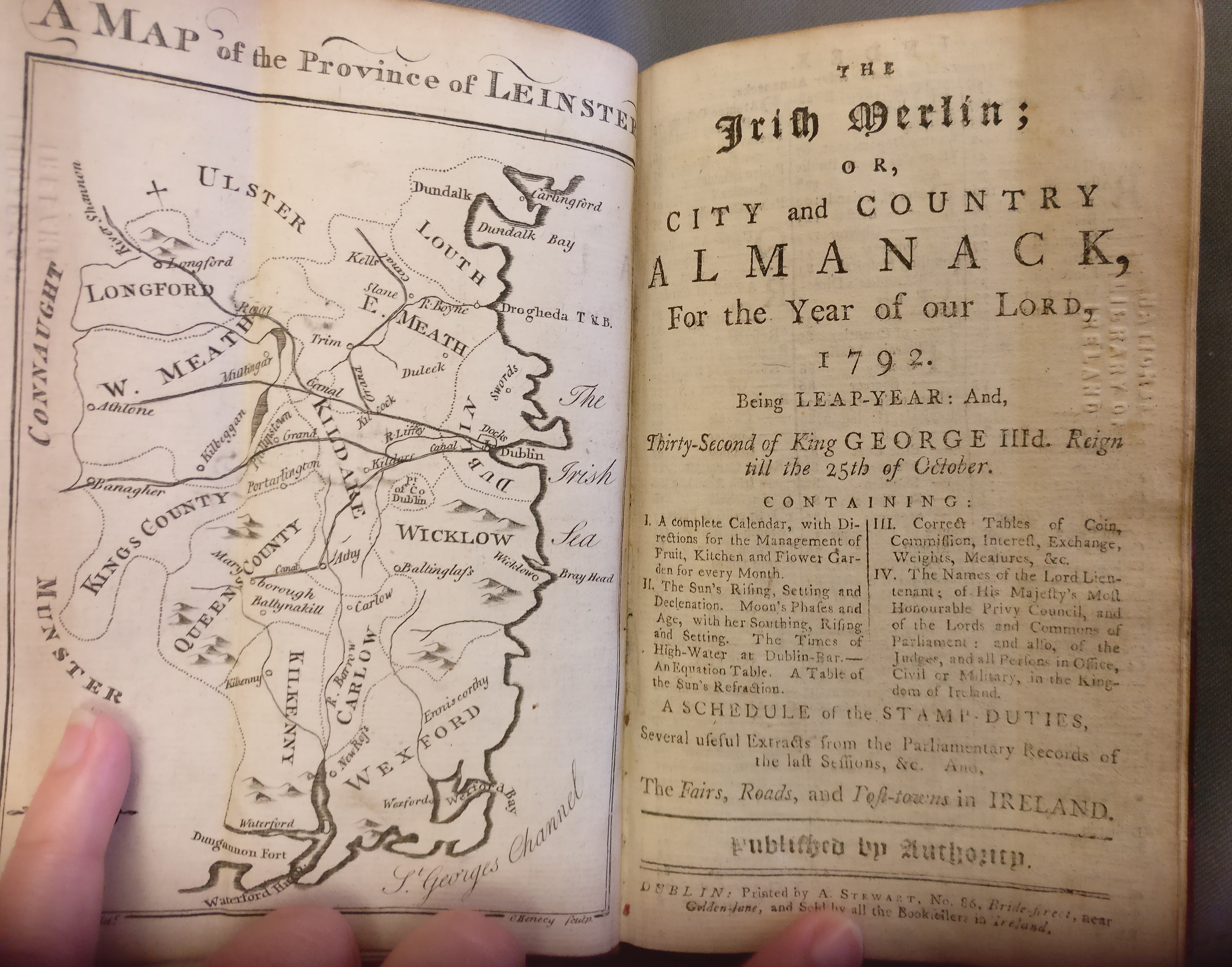
This is the introductory page of the 1792 edition of the Irish Merlin. It is available at the National Library of Ireland.

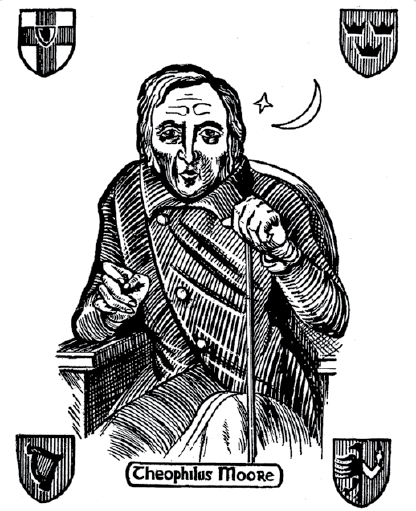
This woodcut image was printed in Theophilus Moore's original editions, and has continued to appear in Old Moore's Almanac ever since.

Old Moore's Almanac is an almanac which has been published for nearly two and a half centuries. Its founder, Theophilus Moore, ran a classical academy at Milltown which was then a village near Dublin (since that time, it has been incorporated into the city). A teacher of Irish, English, Greek and Latin, he became known as a clever mathematician and a wizard of astrology, gaining the nickname 'The Irish Merlin'. He published his Old Moore's Almanac for the first time in 1764, and received such support that the other Irish almanacs gradually dwindled away. Theophilus Moore is now buried in the Drumcondra Churchyard, in Dublin, but the tradition of Old Moore's Almanac continues unbroken to this day.

The Old Moore's Almanac is not to be confused with Old Moore's Almanack (with a "k"), an English publication.

== Publication ==
The Old Moore's Almanac is published annually in November. The current owners of the Old Moore's Almanac, the Lithographic Group, possess back issues dating from 1914 onwards. Issues before this time are held in the National Library of Ireland. The magazine was traditionally a resource for the merchants and business people of the late 1760s, and later, an entertainment-style publication for the agricultural community in rural Ireland. Farmers and fishing folk of the day found the tables of moon and tide times, and transport information, among other useful information very handy on a daily basis.

Now that such information is available on the internet, the magazine was re-launched in 2010, offering a more diverse product to capture new audiences. The magazine is now full colour and now has editorial features. Topics include the revival of lost Irish traditions, technology, urban farming, country sporting pursuits, unusual breeds of animals, recipes, hints and tips, the paranormal, traditional medicine, horoscopes, and an analysis of antique issues of the Almanac (pre-1950). The circulation of the hard copy is around 47,000, with most sales achieved in Athlone, Dublin, Galway and Cork. The predictions are the most popular section of the Almanac. The in-house psychic remains anonymous, often quoting that he "likes to stay under the radar" and away from public life.

The magazine has increased its circulation year-on-year since 2010, which is unusual as printed magazines across the board have seen their circulations fall as more people turn to online reading material.

== History ==
In 1764, an almanac called The Irish Merlin came onto the scene. It was published by Theophilus Moore, known henceforth to generations of Irish people as "Old Moore". But when it was first published, this almanac did not bear the compiler's name, but it was indeed the first Old Moore's Almanac. There was a good reason why Theophilus did not put his name to the Irish Merlin. At the time, the Catholic faith was actively being quashed, and Theophilus, a convinced Catholic, wanted to publish anonymously so he could be free to be completely Catholic in the Irish Merlin, without attracting undue attention from authorities to his entrepreneurial efforts.

John McCall (editor of Old Moore's Almanac from 1874 to 1902) in his manuscript History of Irish Almanacks confirmed that The Irish Merlin was published by Theophilus Moore. He says it was known as one of 'Stewart's Merlins' because it was printed by A. Stewart, a well-known printer and editor of the time.

According to McCall, Moore did indeed commence his almanac in 1764. "At the same time he removed to Dublin where he opened an academy in Charlemont St. and annually supplied the almanack. He was related to Thomas Moore, the poet, who attended his school for a considerable time before he entered college. Theophilus frequented the house of Thomas Moore's father in Aungier St.; they were kinsmen in name and race and consequently allied to each other by ties of close intimacy for many years. Moore's almanack had not the registry of his name till after the period of 1782 when Catholic disabilities were partially removed, when his name appeared in his almanacks. He died at the close of the eighteenth century."

Another account of his early life seems to match the one above. The alternative account gives his birth as 1730 in Offaly, the territory of the O'Moores. It has been asserted that he was a descendant of Rory Oge O'Moore, the ruins of whose castle may still be seen on the rock of Dunamase, three miles east of Portlaoise. The future astrologer spent his youth on the plains of Offaly. He had a great thirst for learning and acquired a deep knowledge in English, Irish, Latin and Greek. He also studied mathematics and astrology. When aged about 30 he went to Dublin, where for a time he led a precarious existence. Ultimately he settled on the Palmerston estate in Old Rathmines, between Milltown and "The Bloody Fields." Here he opened an Academy and taught mathematics and classics as well as astronomy and astrology. He is said to have taught the young members of the Palmerston household, but his fidelity to the Catholic faith and refusal to conform to the Established Church lost him their patronage. Before entering Trinity College, Thomas Moore, the poet, attended the academy of Theophilus as a pupil, and it is said that master and pupil, namesakes and kinsmen, remained always firm friends.

These two separate accounts do match up. Both agree that Theophilus Moore commenced his almanack shortly after coming to Dublin (the almanack would later be spelled almanac). In its early issues the Merlin did not bear the compiler's name, but merely his nom-de-plume: "Philomath." (Philomath means "tutor.")

After the Merlin had been published for about thirty years, "Philomath" became very well known for his prognostications. But many people wanted in on Theophilus' growing fortune, and claimed to be "Philomath," so in 1793, Theophilus Moore came out from the shelter of his nom-de-plume, and claimed his success. From that point onwards, the almanac appeared bearing his name. The title was now The Irish Merlin, or Moore's Almanack, 1793, by Theophilus Moore, Philomath. Soon after, it simply became known as Moore's Almanack.

From 1793 until his death, the almanac appeared with the compiler's name. It grew in popularity and fame. It was in the first decade of the nineteenth century that the famed astrologer died, or as the media reported, that he "was gathered to his fathers." He was then nearly 80 years old.

The woodcut picture of Theophilus Moore used in the book for centuries was carved towards the end of his life, and it shows him bent over, with a walking stick. It seems to be an accurate portrait of Theophilus. Before photos were widely available, people described people's looks with "pen pictures." A pen picture by the Revd. Patrick O'Byrne, of Ralston Street, described him well. "In his early manhood his figure was tall, slight, elastic and graceful; towards the end of his life it naturally was inclined to be stooped. His face was long, narrow and handsome, and his fine head was covered to the last with long masses of soft and wavy hair. His eagle eyes were set deep beneath shaggy beetling eyebrows. His nose was long and aquiline; and the furrowed lines on his high and intellectual forehead proclaimed to the world the deep and anxious thought that ever occupied his great and active mind."

The editorship of the almanac is not clear for a considerable time after the death of Theophilus. However, the magazine continued to be published every year under the name Moore's Almanack. And more copycat magazines appeared ("spurious editions" as they were called). The many copycat editions raised the irk of the real Old Moore's Almanac. In fact they editors of the time often wrote to newspapers complaining about it.

He is an article from the Weekly Telegraph in 1852, in the literature section:

Moore's Almanack for the year of Our Lord 1853

We are calling attention to this work, the genuine Old Moore's Irish Almanack, we feel bound especially to notice because we are aware that the attempt is made to the great injury of the author, and to the great injury of the Irish trade, as well as great injury to the honest fame and fair reputation of the country to call upon the public to either spurious imitations of the real work or to import amongst the people a contraband article called "Moore's Almanack" which is we believe written and printed in England. The attempt should be made by Englishman to despoil us of our Moore's Almanac cannot be a matter of surprise when we know that our neighbours on the other side of the channel have long been endeavouring to despoil us of our Wellington by constantly speaking and writing of the Duke as an Englishman, never as an Irishman. We now conceive it to be the duty of the Irish press to earnestly resist the one dishonest attempt as the other.

We will not let the English have our Theophilus Moore no more than our Arthur Wellesley and we insist on proving that none but the real genuine Theophilus Moore, Philomath, abiding at Skerries could write such prophecies as to be found in The Almanac embellished with his portrait; as in the same manner it has been proved that none but the Irishman Wellington could have fought in the Battle of Waterloo and won it. The Verity of the Irish prophet is proved by his words as the valour of the Irish general was demonstrated by his deeds.

Theophilus Moore, Philomath, the author of The Almanack before us, may be regarded as the only genuine living representative of the extraordinary class of beings who lived ages ago and combined together the power of foretelling future events with the gift of poesy and to whom the name "Vates" was applied in differently. In ancient times the "Vates" was the oracle of his neighbourhood and many such were to be found. But at present we believe there is but one "Vates" in all of Europe and that is our Theophilus Moore and most happy are we to perceive that our Theophilus Moore eschews all sorts of magic fortune telling and conjuring tricks of every kind and description whatsoever. Mr Theophilus Moore abjures alike heresy and idolatry. He is a genuine prophet, a poet and we feel confident, judging from his prophesies, that he is not only a pious Christian, but also a true-hearted Irishman.

In order that the public may judge for themselves, and that the public may better distinguish between the real Theophilus Moore and the fictitious Theophilus Moore whoever they are concocted in England or Ireland, we shall place a few extracts from his prophecies before them.

In 1874, the editorship was given to John McCall. It was thought that just before this sometime, the word "Old" was added to the title, in honour of how long Theophilus actually lived, which was a remarkable achievement of the time.

McCall was editor from 1874 to 1902, when he died at the age of 81 years. McCall held this position for more than a quarter of a century; he actually edited it until a month before his death. McCall was quite well known at this time in Ireland for many accomplishments in publishing. And he was also known during his editorship to have advanced the almanac to a very considerable extent. McCall was known as "a man of wonderful knowledge and natural ability."

During John McCall's editorship he gathered around him a number of vivid personalities, who all contributed to the almanac. They linked together into a clan, and John McCall was regarded as Chieftain. They considered themselves as the successors of the Irish Bards, and wrote of themselves as "The Bards of Di." This title is thought to be derived from the Goddess of the Moon, Diana; the connection of the bards with astrology makes the reference easily understood.

Often in the pages of the Moore's Almanack we see references to "Lady Di" and the contributors are also spoken of as "Diarians" – this latter term is, of course, derived from the word "diary," and may be the explanation of the title of the followers of Di. But whatever be the reason of their title, the bards were very proud of it, and had developed close bonds of fellowship and friendship.

The later issues of Old Moore's Almanack have many elegies penned for departed bards of this clan. On the death of John McCall, the bards became very vocal, and many elegies appeared for many years in praise of his work and in his memory.

After McCall, the relatively famous Patrick Keary edited the Moore's Almanack under the pen name "Kevin Kay" for two years. He was succeeded by Michael Fanning, and then by Seamus Bolger.

In 1940 the circulation was 200,000 copies, and even more than that were sold "in every part of the globe whither Irishmen have gone.The popularity of Old Moore's Almanack was well grounded, upon its usefulness and its interest. As regards the former, it supplied, in cheap and handy form, much information of everyday service to the farmer and rural worker, as well as to many town-dwellers."

Even beggars were said to have bought the Old Moore's Almanack, they gained the best begging takings at the fairs and marts that were listed faithfully in each edition.

Historian B. P. Bowen said in 1940;

"It is not surprising that such a publication should have found favour among the people of the country, when newspapers were scarce, before modern progress had so changed means of communication. It has been said, with much truth, that the books in the average country cabin during the nineteenth century consisted of a prayer book, a chap-book [a small paperback booklet, typically containing poems or fiction] and an Old Moore's Almanack. This last provided much material of a puzzling nature to while away long winter evenings, and encouraged those of an ingenious turn to try their skill in solving the problems proposed. As prizes were given for solutions to the puzzles, and for new puzzles for next year, the connection between issues was maintained. Let it not be thought that the poems have been mere drivel—far from it; many show distinct merit, and sometimes herald the rise of a new poet. John Keegan Casey ("Leo" of the Nation) appeared in the pages of Old Moore as a youthful and aspiring poet. So did Charles Kickham, under the nom-de-plume of "Cavellus." The late P. J. McCall made many contributions to Old Moore's Almanack in his early days. The pages of Old Moore were always open to the budding rhymester, and the better his work the more likely he was to have it published."

The success of the Old Moore's Almanac meant that more copycat versions sprang to life, all wanting a piece of the pie. In 1851, the enterprising John Francis Nugent, of 35 Cook Street, Dublin, started his own almanac, in opposition to Old Moore's Almanac. It was called Nugent's Old Moore's Almanac. The original Old Moore's Almanac was, at this point, fed up to the gills of other publishers stealing their thunder, and also their name.

Nugent acted as manager and editor of this rip-off version of the Old Moore's Almanac until his death in 1866, and after that it was taken over by his assistant. But then something strange happened. In 1886, McCall, long-time editor of the genuine Old Moore's Almanac, became editor of Nugent's Moore's Almanac simultaneously. He carried on like this for 12 years. It would seem to be a conflict of interest: Nugent's Almanac was very similar to Old Moore's Almanac; there were the usual prophecies and weather forecasts. In the end, Nugent's almanac was taken over by Nugent's widow but in 1898 she re-married and allowed it to lapse.

There were other copycats. An edition in 1900 of Old Moore by W. A. Quirke of 25, Wicklow Street, was the subject of a legal action by the proprietor of the genuine Old Moore's Almanac at the time, P. C. D. Warren. Not only was this new copycat edition stealing its thunder, it was not even producing original copy; it was stealing the exact copy from Old Moore's Almanac, and printing it under its own name.

Warren obtained an injunction against Quirke restraining him from publishing any almanac containing a list of fairs taken from the plaintiff's publication. This stopped the sale of Quirke's almanac and he was debarred from selling any copies of the issue in question.

The Genuine Old Moore's Almanac then tried to copyright the name "Moore's Almanack." The court refused to grant exclusive use of the words "Old Moore" or "Moore's Almanack" to the plaintiff. This was due to the fact that many copycat almanacs were already published in England called "Old Moore's" and it would be too difficult to police. The ship had sailed. It is assumed that Old Moore's Almanack became Old Moore's Almanac, to distinguish it from all of the other non-genuine competitors. The almanac without the "k" was forevermore the genuine one.

The perceived accuracy of the predictions gave Old Moore's Almanac its staying power. Theophilus Moore himself was said to have had a great skill in prophecy, and subsequent editors made sure that whoever did the predictions was good at it.

The editor and the prophet have not always been the same person, as is the case in the 2018 edition. Michael Fanning, a native of Brackenstown, County Dublin, was a regular contributor to almanacs, and did some of the predictions for Old Moore's Almanac; Bernard O'Neill, of Blackwatertown on the Moy near Armagh, was the prophet for some time previous to 1914-15.

There are famous examples of predictions coming true in the past which made readers talk endlessly. In 1903 it was foretold that "a crown would fall from a kingly head" – the chance was, no doubt, rather a wide one, but when, in June, 1903, the King and Queen of Serbia were assassinated, who could doubt the vision of the prophet? In that year also, Old Moore declared that "the Eternal City would have cause to go into mourning," and the death of Pope Leo XIII in July, 1903 was the apparent fulfilment of that prophecy.

The Old Moore's Almanac once foretold that the Derby would be run in a snowstorm; as this race takes place in June, the likelihood seemed remote, but it happened, and the Almanac received much kudos. After Old Moore's successful prediction of the victory of a horse called Blenheim in the Derby, many half-crowns were sent direct to the editor to be staked on the winner of the next big race. But he had to decline the responsibility and return the money.

Old Moore was so popular at one time that the travelling pedlar or the man walking the roads had often cause to bless the Almanac. It was seen as having the powers of "open sesame" to many a country cabin and often ensured a meal or a night's lodging for the wayfarer. One pedlar has said that he always set out with a bundle of the recently issued Almanacs under his arm, knowing that for many a day he could obtain his bed and board from those he visited, thanks to the welcome given to Old Moore in the countryside.

In 2018, the editor and the prophet are once again two different people.

== Historical copies ==
Historical copies of the Almanac are in the National Library of Ireland in Dublin. The books cannot be borrowed, but they can be perused in the reading rooms.

- The title started its life as The Irish Merlin in 1764
- The title was changed to Moore's Almanack around 1782
- By 1853 it was called Old Moore's Almanack
- After around 1900 it was called Old Moore's Almanac

Occasionally, old copies of the Almanac are offered for sale on eBay or other auction sites. Recently, an Irish Merlin from 1765 was sold on eBay. You can also find copies in the Marsh Library in Dublin, and in Trinity's Old Library, which also holds the Book of Kells.

Historian B. P. Bowen B.L., B.Sc. He wrote an article about the Old Moore's Almanac in 1940 for the Dublin Historical Record Vol. 3, No. 1 (Sep., - Nov., 1940), pp. 26-37. The Dublin Historical Record is a history journal established in 1938, published biannually by the Old Dublin Society, which still exists today. (olddublinsociety.ie)

== Predictions ==
The almanac includes predictions for Ireland and the world. The weather predictions always receive a lot of attention in Ireland, where the weather is a highly prized conversation subject. For example, the 2018 predictions included:

- This is the year of the cryptocurrency. Cryptocurrencies will change the world in a short span of time. Trade sanctions will be ignored as people move around them with e-money. Governments will scramble to try to regulate and tax it. Entrepreneurial spirit will use the cryptocurrencies to create and build whole new disruptive businesses. Western free-economy countries will thrive using it.
- This year, there will be a lot of well-known people who will die suddenly/unexpectedly. 2018 will be the year of the shock-death of famous people.
- In Ireland, there will be more discussions about getting religion out of school. Irish Millennials to move abroad in increasing numbers.

== See also ==
- Old Farmer's Almanac
- Farmers' Almanac
- Poor Richard's Almanack
- Thom's Directory
