= David Wilson (Dean of St Patrick's Cathedral, Dublin) =

Irish Anglican priest and hymnist

David Frederick Ruddell Wilson (1871–1957) was an Irish Anglican priest and hymnist. He was Dean of St. Patrick's Cathedral, Dublin in the Church of Ireland in the second quarter of the 20th century.

Born into an ecclesiastical family, he was educated at Trinity College, Dublin. Ordained in 1895, his first position was as a curate at St. Ann's Belfast. He was Succentor and then Precentor of St. Patrick's Cathedral, Dublin until 1914 when he became Rector of Drumcondra. On Christmas Eve 1914, he organised the first service of Nine Lessons and Carols in Ireland in North Strand Church. He then held a similar post at Donnybrook until his elevation to the Deanery.

He died on 24 November 1957.

Church of Ireland titles
Preceded by Thomas Arnold Harvey	Dean of St Patrick's Cathedral, Dublin; 1935–1950	Succeeded by William Cecil De Pauley
