= Norman Emerson =

Norman David Emerson (10 July 1900 – 12 January 1966) was an Anglican priest and author.

Emerson was born in Lurgan and educated at Trinity College, Dublin. He was ordained in 1924 and being a curate at Drumcondra and Rathgar he was the rector of St Mary's Dublin from 1933 to 1961 when he became Dean of Christ Church Cathedral, Dublin, a position he held until his death.

== Notes ==
Religious titles
Preceded by Ernest Henry Cornwall Lewis-Crosby	Dean of Christ Church Cathedral, Dublin; 1961– 1966	Succeeded by Thomas Noel Desmond Cornwall Salmon
