= William Greene (dean of Christ Church Cathedral, Dublin) =

William Conyngham Greene (19 October 1827 – 9 August 1910) was an Anglican priest in the late 18th and early 19th centuries. He was the son of Richard Wilson Greene, judge of the Court of Exchequer (Ireland) and Elizabeth Wilson, daughter of Thomas Wilson of Fulford, North Yorkshire. His nephew was the eminent diplomat Sir Conyngham Greene. He was educated at Trinity College Dublin, and ordained in 1850. He was a curate at St Anne's, Dublin, and then held four successive Dublin incumbencies; St Peter's, St Michael's, St John's and St Werburgh's. In 1887 he became Dean of Christ Church Cathedral, Dublin, a post he held for 21 years. He died on 9 August 1910.

Church of England titles
Preceded by William Plunket, 4th Baron Plunket	Dean of Christ Church Cathedral, Dublin; 1887– 1908	Succeeded by James Hornidge Walsh
