= Macrobius (bishop) =

12th-century Irish priest

Macrobius was an Irish priest in the twelfth century. He was Archdeacon of Dublin, then Bishop of Glendalough.

== See also ==
- Bishop of Glendalough
