= Diocese of Dublin and Glendalough =

Anglican diocese of the Church of Ireland

United Dioceses of Dublin and Glendalough Dioeceses Unitae Dublinensis et Glendalochensis Deoisí Aontaithe Bhaile Átha Cliath agus Ghleann Dá Loch
- Coat of arms

Location
- Ecclesiastical province: Dublin

Statistics
- Parishes: 95

Information
- Denomination: Anglican
- Cathedral: Christ Church Cathedral, Dublin
- Language: English, Irish

Current leadership
- Bishop: Michael Jackson, Archbishop of Dublin and Bishop of Glendalough

Website
- dublin.anglican.org

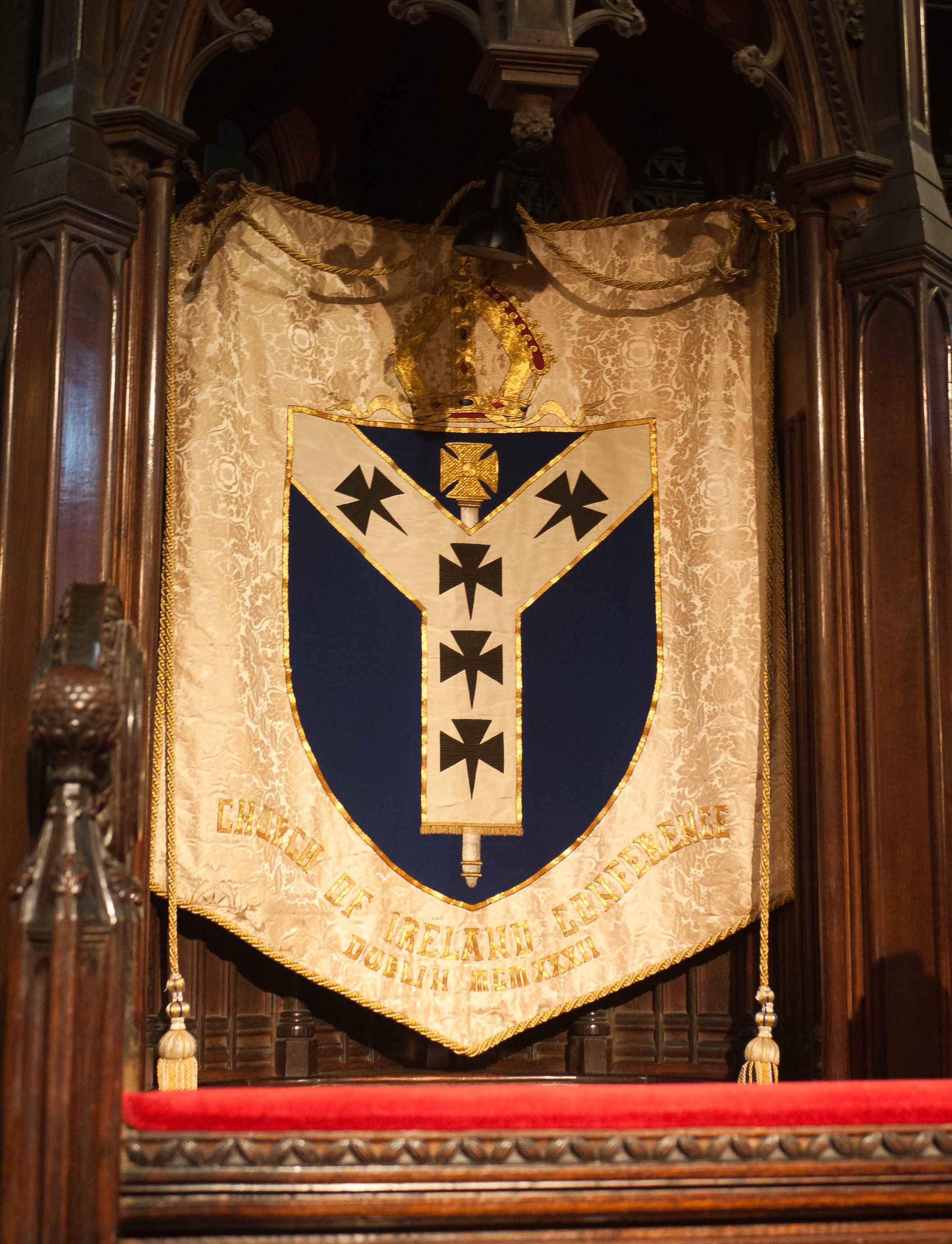
Standard of the Diocese of Dublin and Glendalough at the Archbishop's throne in Christ Church Cathedral

The United Dioceses of Dublin and Glendalough is a diocese of the Church of Ireland in the east of Ireland. It is headed by the Archbishop of Dublin, who is also styled the Primate of Ireland. The diocesan cathedral is Christ Church Cathedral, Dublin.

== Overview and history ==
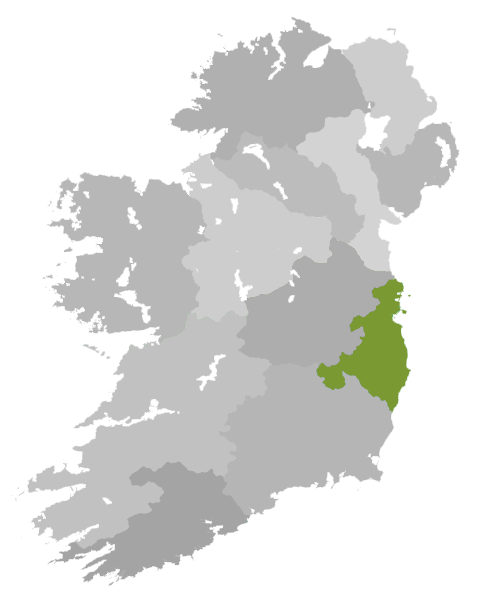
Diocese Highlighted

=== Early Christianity in Ireland ===
The broad Dublin area was Christian long before Dublin had a distinct diocese, with monasteries such as Glendalough as well as at Finglas, Glasnevin, Rathmichael, Swords, Tallaght. Several of these functioned as "head churches" and the most powerful of all was Glendalough.

In the early church in Ireland, the church had a monastic basis, with greatest power vested in the Abbots of the major communities. There were bishops but not organised dioceses in the modern sense, and the offices of abbot and bishop were often comprised in one person. Some early "Bishops of Dublin", back to 633, are mentioned in Ware's Antiquities of Ireland but the Diocese of Dublin is not considered to have begun until 1038, and when Ireland began to see organised dioceses, all of the current Diocese of Dublin, and more, was comprised in the Diocese of Glendalough.

=== The Norse Diocese of Dublin ===
Following a reverted conversion by one Norse King of Dublin, Sitric, his son Godfrey became Christian in 943, and the Kingdom of Dublin first sought to have a bishop of its own in the 11th century, under Sitric MacAulaf, who had been on pilgrimage to Rome. He sent his chosen candidate, Donat (or Donagh or Donatus), to be consecrated in Canterbury in 1038, and the new prelate set up the Diocese of Dublin as a small territory within the walled city, over which he presided until 1074. The new diocese was not part of the Church in Ireland but of the Norse Province of Canterbury. Sitric also provided for the building of Christ Church Cathedral in 1038 "with the lands of Baldoyle, Raheny and Portrane for its maintenance."

At the Synod of Rathbreasail, convened in 1118 by Gillebert (Gilbert), Bishop of Limerick, on papal authority, the number of dioceses in Ireland was fixed at twenty-four. Dublin was not included, the city being described as lying in the Diocese of Glendalough, but the Norse Bishops continued, still attached to Canterbury.

=== The Reorganisation of the Church in Ireland, 1152 ===
Then, in 1151, Pope Eugene III commissioned Cardinal Paparo to go to Ireland and establish four metropolitans, and at a general synod at Kells in 1152, Armagh, Dublin, Cashel, and Tuam, were created archiepiscopal sees. In a document drawn up by the then Archbishop of Tuam in 1214, the cardinal is described as finding both a bishop based in Dublin, who at the time exercised his episcopal office within the city walls only, and "He found in the same Diocese another church in the mountains, which likewise had the name of a city (Glendalough) and had a certain chorepiscopus. But he delivered the pallium to Dublin which was the best city and appointed that the diocese (Glendalough) in which both these cities were should be divided, and that one part thereof should fall to the metropolitan."

The part of North County Dublin known as Fingall was taken from Glendalough Diocese and attached to Dublin City. The new Archdiocese had 40 parishes, in deaneries based on the old senior monasteries. All dependence upon English churches such as Canterbury was also ended.

=== The Early Archbishops ===
The founding Archbishop of the larger Dublin Diocese, consecrated at Lambeth, was Gregory, with the Bishops of Kildare, Ossory, Leighlin, Ferns, and Glendalough reporting to him.

The second Archbishop, from 1161 to 1179, was Saint Laurence O'Toole, previously Abbot of Glendalough, who had previously been elected as Bishop of Glendalough but had declined that office. During his time in office, the presence of the Church grew in Dublin city (by 1170 there were six churches other than the cathedral within the walls) and religious orders from the continent came to Ireland (Augustinians, Dominicans, Franciscans and Carmelites had houses in Dublin, and the great convent of Grace Dieu, near Donabate, was an example of women's religious life and education). As part of this trend, Laurence installed a community of canons to minister according to the Aroasian Rule in the Cathedral of the Holy Trinity, later known as Christchurch. The important house of Abbey of Saint Mary was founded in Dublin at that time, first under the Benedictine Rule, then passing to the Cistercians.

Not only was the Irish Church transformed in that 12th century by new organisation and new arrivals from abroad, but Ireland's political scene was changed permanently by the coming of the Normans and the influence of the English Crown.

Saint Laurence's successor was a Norman, and from then onward to the time of the Reformation in Ireland, Dublin's Archbishops were all either Norman or English.

=== Merger of Dublin and Glendalough ===
In 1185, the Lord of Ireland, John Lackland, granted the merger of the dioceses of Dublin and Glendalough. This was initially without effect as the charter lacked papal approval. When the bishop Macrobius died in 1192, a synod was held in Dublin under the direction of the papal legate Metthew O Enna. William Piro was elected as bishop of Glendalough and remained in office at least until 1212. Robert de Bedford was elected as successor in 1213 or 1214 but he had never the opportunity to take possession of the diocesan seat. Instead, John, now King of England, reissued a grant to join Glendalough to Dublin which was finally approved by Pope Innocent III in 1216 and confirmed by his successor Honorius III in the same year.

=== Reformation ===
The English-speaking minority in Ireland post-Reformation mostly adhered to the Church of Ireland or to Presbyterianism; the dioceses became integrated into this new church independent from the Catholic Church. In 1833, the two provinces of Dublin and Cashel were merged. Over the centuries, numerous dioceses were merged, in view of declining membership.

== Structure ==
The united entity comprises 95 parishes, many now operating in unions. The parishes and other religious organisations in diocesan jurisdiction include:

Archdiocese of Dublin

Parishes

- Booterstown (Mount Merrion was United with Booterstown)
- Bray
- Castleknock
- Christ Church Cathedral Group of Parishes (St. Andrew, St. Werburgh with St Mary, St. Michan and St. Paul, and All Saints', Grangegorman)
- Clondalkin
- Clontarf, comprising also Killester for many centuries
- Coolock, in Union with Raheny since 1960
- Crinken
- Crumlin
- Dalkey
- Donnybrook
- Drumcondra
- Dun Laoghaire
- Glenageary
- Holmpatrick (Skerries)
- Howth
- Kill
- Killiney (Ballybrack)
- Killiney, Holy Trinity
- Kilternan
- Malahide
- Monkstown
- Raheny, in Union with Coolock since 1960
- Rathfarnham
- Rathmichael
- Rathmines
- Sandford
- Sandymount
- Santry - St. Pappan's Church
- St. Ann
- St. Bartholomew
- St. George and St. Thomas
- St. Patrick's Cathedral Group of Parishes (St. Catherine and St. James, St. Audoen's)
- Stillorgan
- Swords
- Tallaght
- Taney
- Tullow
- Whitechurch
- Zion

Other entities

- Adelaide and Meath Hospital, Tallaght
- C.O.R E. (City Outreach through Renewal and Evangelisation)
- Church of Ireland Theological College
- CMSI Dublin
- General Synod Education Office
- Irish Church Missions
- Rathdown School
- St. Columba's College
- The King's Hospital
- University College, Dublin
- University of Dublin

Diocese of Glendalough

Parishes

- Arklow
- Athy
- Blessington
- Castlemacadam
- Celbridge
- Delgany
- Donoughmore
- Dunganstown
- Greystones
- Leixlip
- Narraghmore
- Newcastle
- Powerscourt
- Rathdrum
- Wicklow

Other entities

- East Glendalough School

== See also ==
- List of Anglican dioceses in the United Kingdom and Ireland
