= Drumcondra Church =

Drumcondra Church of Ireland
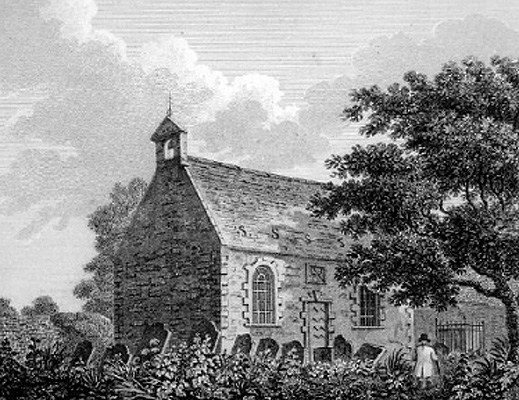
- A view of the church and churchyard, by Daniel Grose, c. 1790, from Antiquities of Ireland, Vol. II
- Drumcondra Church of Ireland
- 53°22′16.79″N 6°15′0.73″W
- Location: Drumcondra, Dublin
- Country: Ireland
- Denomination: Church of Ireland

History
- Founder: Mary Coghill
- Dedication: St. John the Baptist

Administration
- Province: Province of Dublin
- Diocese: Diocese of Dublin and Glendalough
- Parish: United Parish of Drumcondra, North Strand, and Saint Barnabas

Clergy
- Rector: Rev. Garth Bunting

Drumcondra Church of Ireland is a Church of Ireland church located in Drumcondra, Dublin, previously in the Civil Parish of Clonturk. The church and its churchyard contain memorials to a number of notable historical figures.

== History ==
In 1743 the dilapidated old church of the parish of Clonturk was rebuilt by Mary Coghill as a memorial to her brother, who lived in Drumcondra House, Dr. Marmaduke Coghill, who died in 1738. On the northside of the church is the large tomb of Dr. Coghill, born in 1673 in Dublin, who was a judge of the Prerogative Court and Chancellor of the Exchequer, as well as being an MP in the Irish Parliament. On the tomb reclines his effigy in his official robes, with figures of Minerva and Religion below which was sculpted by Peter Scheemakers.

By about 1721, Marmaduke Coghill was in control of the interments. In 1733 Henry Hamilton was succeeded as incumbent by Edward Hudson, followed by Robert Johnson in 1740, in 1748 James Edkins, 1781 Charles O'Neill, 1789 Jacob Cramer, 1816 William Barlow, and in 1826, James Duncan Long.

In 1896 Drumcondra parish was merged with North Strand. Rev. Ernest Lewis-Crosby was rector from 1904–1914, he was succeeded by Rev. David Wilson who later served as Dean of St. Patrick's.

Today, together with the North Strand Church (Waterloo Avenue) it serves the Anglican community as part of the Parish of Drumcondra, North Strand, and St Barnabas. The Parish would be bounded by Clontarf Parish (confusingly also dedicated to St. John the Baptist) to the east, St. Mobhi's Church, Glasnevin, to the West, and St. Pappan's Church, Santry to the North. Since 2016 Drumcondra (and North Strand) also serve the Parish of St. George and St. Thomas, which is to the South of Drumcondra Church.

The church contains a memorial to parishioners who fought in the Great War.

Drumcondra National School, on Church Avenue, is under the patronage of the Church of Ireland and the Rector would visit and minister there. Drumcondra National School was opened in 1906 by Rector Lewis-Crosby, originally in a prefab on the grounds of the Church, it moved to its current location in 1907. The school underwent a major rejuvenations in 2014, when the school moved temporarily to Childvision, in the grounds of St. Joseph's, and was reopened and re-dedicated in 2015 by the Archbishop of Dublin and former pupil Archbishop of Armagh Rev. Dr. Richard Clarke.

Bishop Charles Tyndall served as Rector of Rector of Drumcondra with North Strand and Bishop Robert Warke, served as Rector of Drumcondra with North Strand and St Barnabas (1967–1971). Rev. Canon Roy Byrne was Rector from 2007 until 2016, and was succeeded by present Rector Garth Bunting.

== Notable burials ==
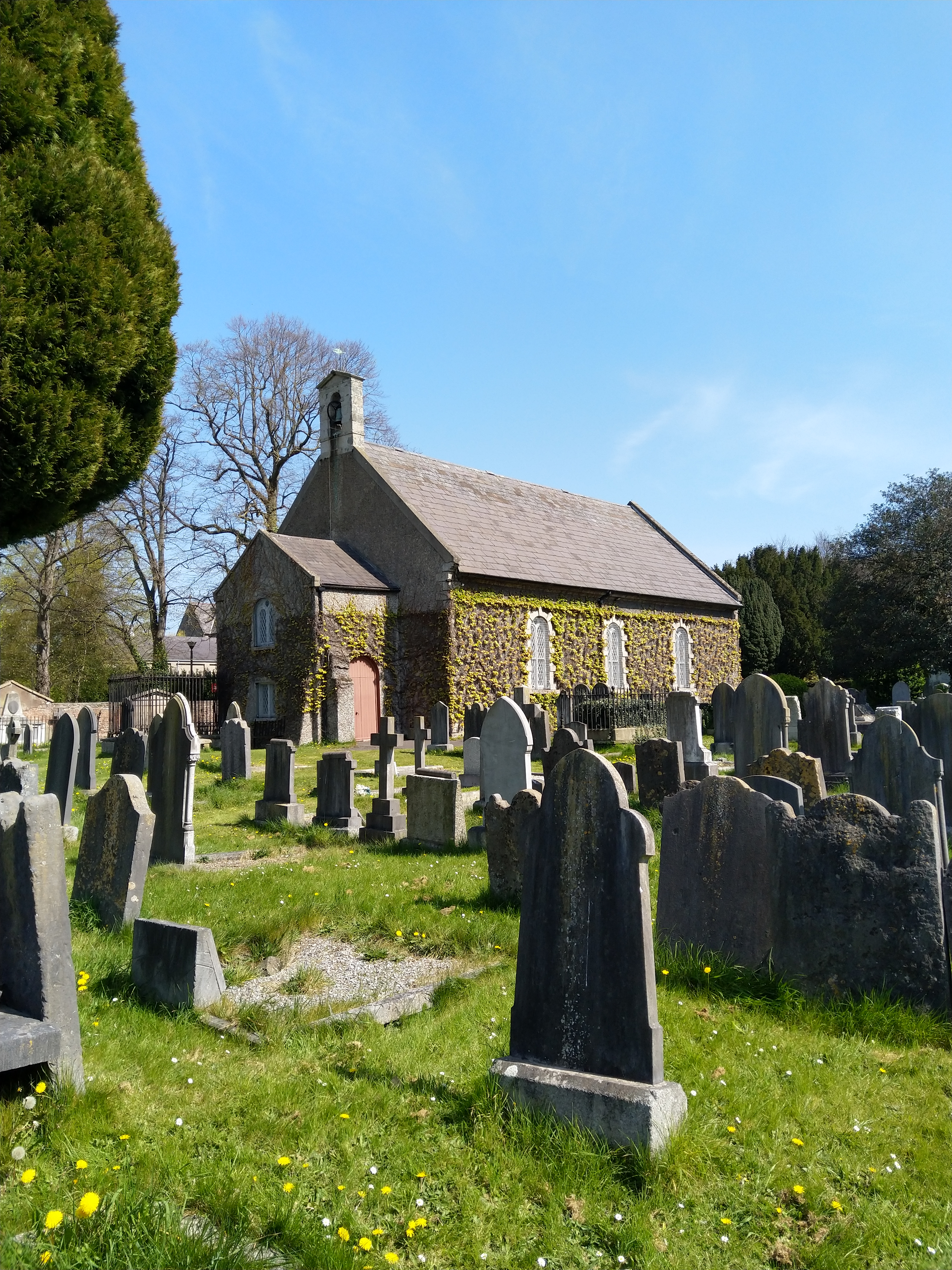
Church and graveyard in 2021

Notable people buried in the churchyard include:

- James Gandon (1743–1823), architect, designer of the Custom House, Dublin. Gandon was buried by his own request in the grave of his lifelong friend, Francis Grose.
- Francis Grose (1731–1791), antiquary, died in the home of Horace Hone and was buried 18 May 1791 on the south-side of the churchyard in the presence of his nephew Lieutenant Daniel Grose, Horace and Camillus Hone, James Gandon and Christopher Pack the painter. A view of the church and churchyard drawn by Daniel Grose bears the inscription: To James Gandon and Samuel Walker Esqrs., Mr. Horace Hone and Richd. Edwd. Mercier who attended the funeral of the late Francis Grose Esqr. to the Church of Drumcondra near Dublin, where his Remains were deposited 18th May, 1791. The figure of Captain Grose in the image is placed on his own grave.
- Thomas Furlong, poet, who translated Carolan's The Irish Minstrelsy, died in 1827 aged 33 years and was buried near the monument of Francis Grose. His grave bore the memorial: To the Memory of Thomas FURLONG, Esq. In whom the purest principles of Patriotism and honour were combined with Superior Poetic Genius This Memorial of Friendship is erected by those who valued and admired his various talents, public integrity and private worth. He died 25th July, 1827 aged 33 years. May he rest in peace!
- Theophilus Moore, who was buried near Thomas Furlong, settled on the Palmerston estate in Old Rathmines and opened an academy where Thomas Moore the poet, a namesake and kinsman, attended. Shortly after coming to Dublin, Theophilus Moore first published Old Moore's Almanac in 1764.
- George Grierson (c 1678–1753), printer and publisher. In 1720 he was one of the churchwardens. Grierson married three times. His first wife was buried on 19 May 1726. He married secondly in 1726 the talented editor and poet Constantia Crawley, who was buried 4 December 1732 and other Griersons were buried 30 July 1731, 20 March 1732, and 11 March 1739.
- Patrick Heeney (1881–1911), composer of the music of the Irish national anthem "Amhrán na bhFiann" ("The Soldier's Song").
- Two Commonwealth service war graves – a Drummer of the Royal Engineers of World War I and a Royal Naval Volunteer Reserve officer of World War II.

The Birth, Marriage and Death records are held in the Representative Church Body Library in Churchtown, Dublin.

There is a commemorative plaque to members of the parish who died or were missing in the first and second world wars, also listing members of the 7th company of the boys brigade who died. There is also a memorial to the Coghill family, which mentions Lieut. Neville Coghill VC who died attempting to save the colours of the 24th Foot at the Battle of Isandlwana in the Zulu War of 1879.

== Refurbishment ==
A report of 1831 stated that the churchyard was in a deplorable condition – no sooner was a body buried but it was removed by body-snatchers. Over the following two years the church and churchyard were renovated and a cottage was provided for a watchman to watch over the graves at all times.
