= St. Thomas's Church, Cathal Brugha Street =

Church of Ireland church in Dublin

Coordinates: 53.3524°N 6.2597°W

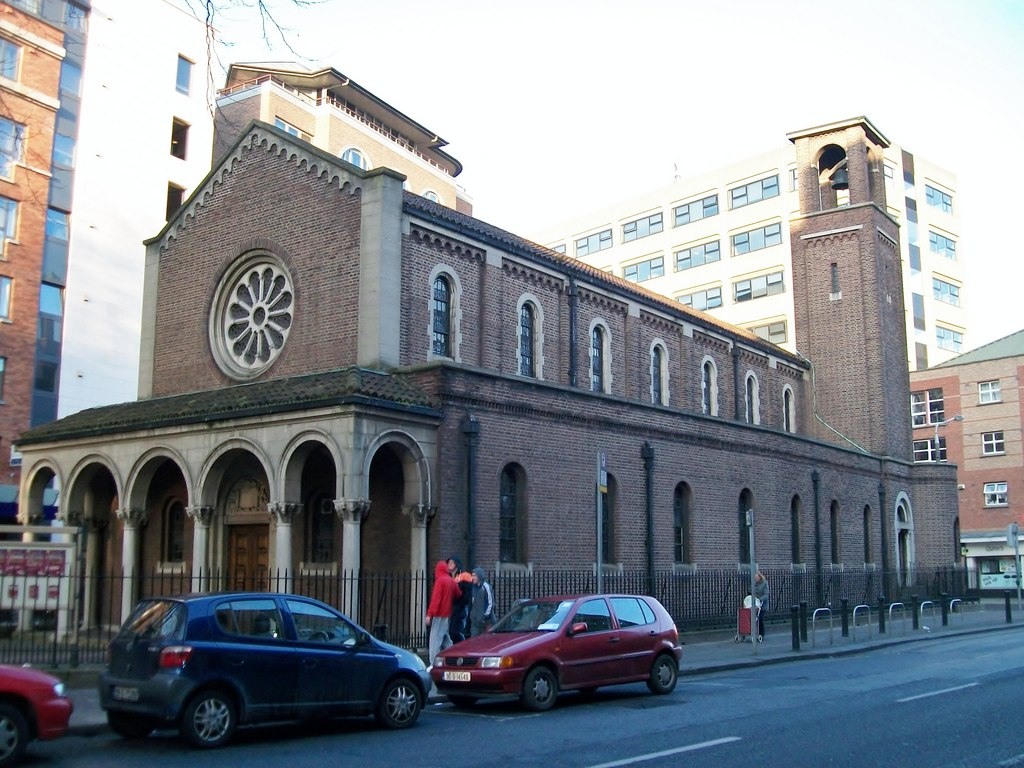
St. Thomas's Church, Cathal Brugha Street

St. Thomas's Church, is a Church of Ireland church on Cathal Brugha Street, Dublin.

== History ==
The church was designed by the architect Fredrick G. Hicks and it was opened in 1931; it won the 1932–33 Royal Institute of Architects Ireland Prize. It was built to replace St. Thomas's Church on Marlborough Street, which was destroyed by fire during the Irish Civil War in 1922. It is situated on Cathal Brugha Street, between Findlater Place and Marlborough Street.

With the decline in Church of Ireland congregations, the parish of St. Thomas merged in 1966 with the parish of St. George. In 1990, the church was renamed the Church of St. Thomas and St. George. St. George's Brass Band moved to Cathal Brugha Street.

Over the years, a number of other Christian denominations were allowed to use the church, including Orthodox, Filipino Christians and the Anglican Igbo Speaking Community. St. Thomas Indian Orthodox Church use the building for their weekly services, and from 2006 it became their parish church.

St. Thomas's ceased to be a Church of Ireland parish church in 2017. When the parishes of Drumcondra and North Strand (Waterloo Avenue) served as the nearest parish churches for the Anglican community. In 2021, there was a movement to return the church to its parishioners and in September 2023 the church reopened for worship.
