= Burials in Glasnevin Cemetery =

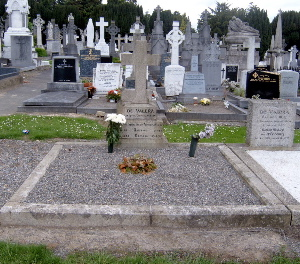
Éamon de Valera's grave His wife Sinéad, son Brian, are also buried there.

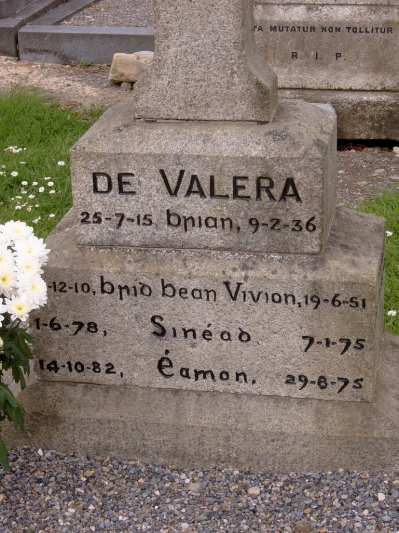
A close up view of the de Valera gravestone

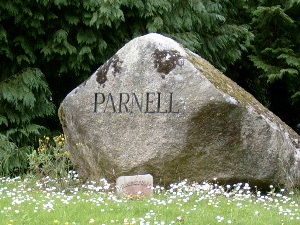
Charles Stewart Parnell's gravestone Though a member of the Church of Ireland, Parnell was buried in Glasnevin in view of its status – at least in the eyes of those who followed him in politics – as the de facto national cemetery

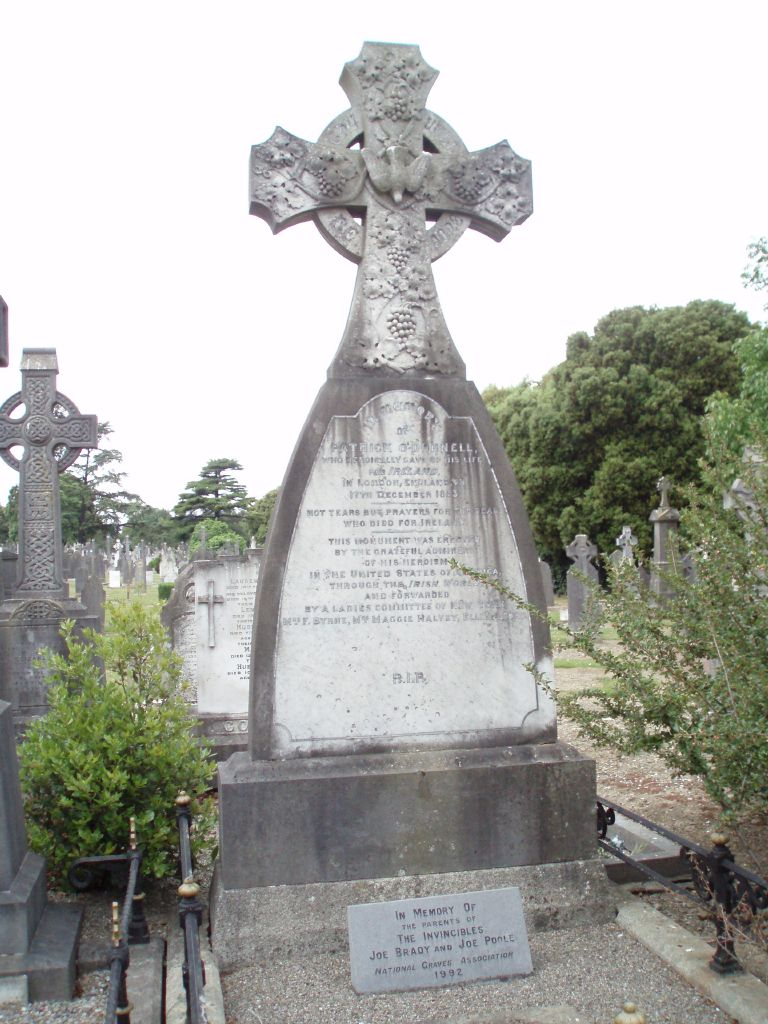
Memorial to Patrick O'Donnell, Glasnevin Cemetery, Dublin

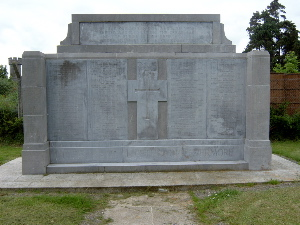
Monument to Ireland's war dead in the Great War 1914–18. The monument lists those buried in the cemetery killed during Ireland's involvement serving in Irish regiments of the British and Allied Armies.

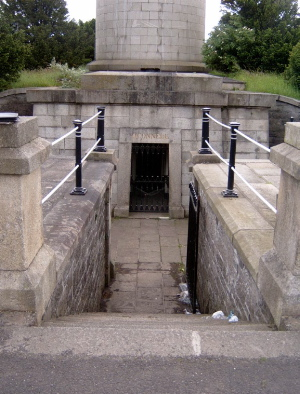
Tomb of Daniel O'Connell under the specially built round tower

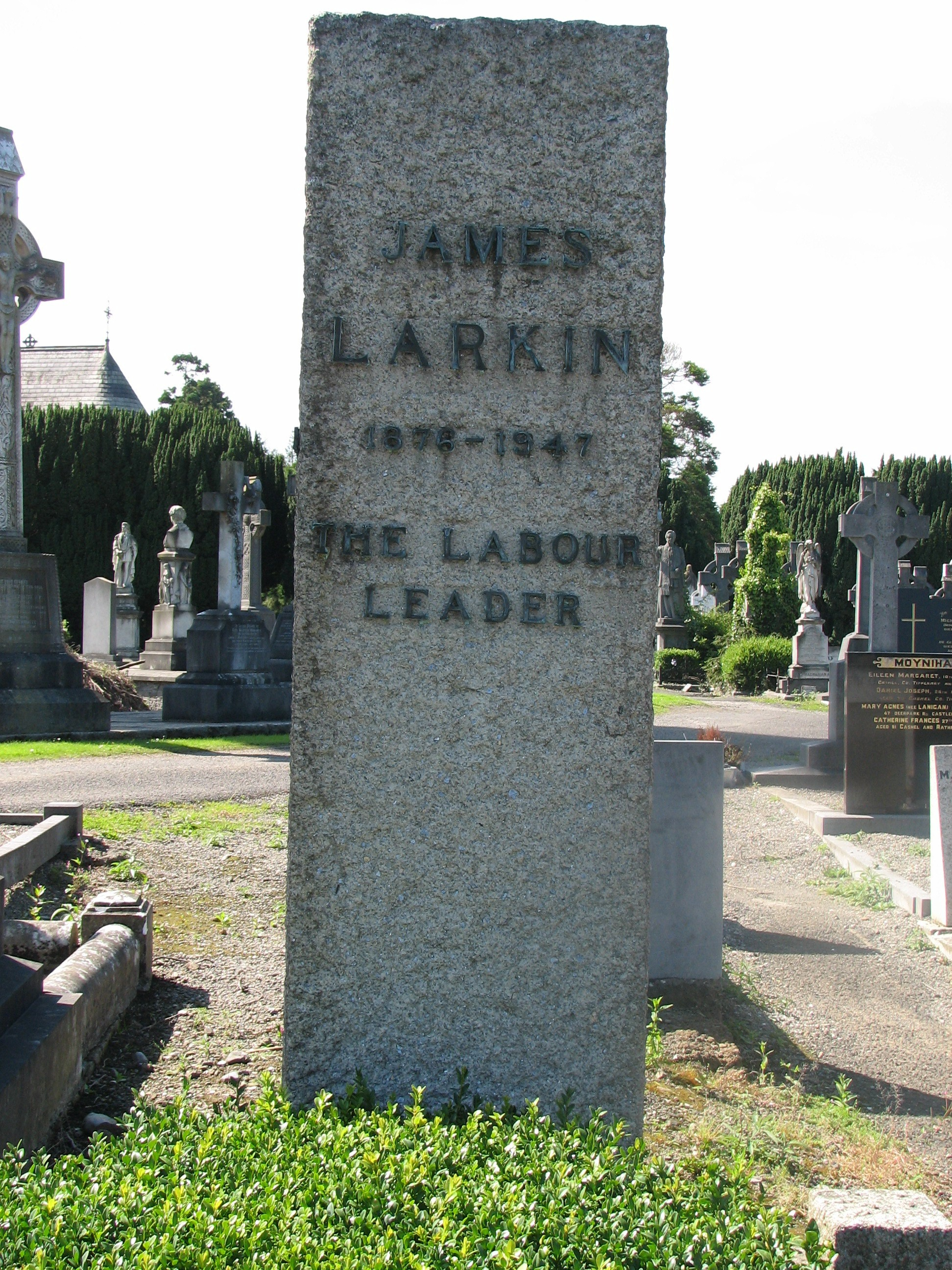
Grave of Irish socialist leader James Larkin

This is a list of notable people buried in Glasnevin Cemetery.

- Thomas Ashe – died on hunger strike in 1917
- Kevin Barry – medical student executed for his role in the Irish War of Independence. (His body was moved from Mountjoy Prison to Glasnevin in 2001, having been accorded a state funeral.)
- Piaras Béaslaí – Easter Rising survivor turned writer
- Sir Alfred Chester Beatty – art collector
- Brendan Behan – author and playwright
- Professor Thomas Bodkin – lawyer, art historian, art collector and curator
- Harry Boland – friend of Michael Collins and anti-Treaty politician. Image of Harry Boland's grave
- Christy Brown – writer of My Left Foot and subject of the film of the same name
- Father Francis Browne – Jesuit priest and photographer who took the last known photographs of RMS Titanic
- Cathal Brugha – first President of Dáil Éireann (January – April 1919) Image of Cathal Brugha's grave
- Thomas Henry Burke – Permanent Under Secretary to Chief Secretary for Ireland Lord Frederick Cavendish, victim with his master of the Phoenix Park murders in 1882
- James Byrne – sergeant, British Army; Victoria Cross recipient (Indian Mutiny)
- Sir Roger Casement – human rights campaigner turned revolutionary, executed by the British in 1916 ^{2} Image of Casement grave
- Erskine Childers – Irish Nationalist and writer, executed by the Irish Free State government during the Irish Civil War. Erskine Childers' grave, located in the Republican Plot
- Mary "Molly" Alden Childers – Irish Nationalist and wife of Erskine Childers
- J. J. Clancy – Irish Nationalist MP (1847–1928)
- Michael Collins – republican leader, Anglo-Irish Treaty signatory and first internationally recognised Irish head of government
- Roddy Connolly – socialist politician and son of James Connolly
- Andy Cooney – Irish republican
- John Philpot Curran – patriotic barrister, renowned wit, lawyer on behalf of Wolfe Tone and other United Irishmen, Sarah Curran's father
- Michael Cusack – founder of the Gaelic Athletic Association
- William Dargan – Ireland's rail pioneer
- Peggy Dell – Irish singer and pianist
- Charlotte Despard – suffragist
- Éamon de Valera – 3rd President of Ireland (1959–1973) and dominant Irish leader of the 20th century
- Sinéad de Valera – wife of Éamon de Valera, buried in the same plot
- Anne Devlin – famed housekeeper of Robert Emmet
- John Devoy – Fenian leader Image of John Devoy's grave.
- John Blake Dillon – Irish writer and politician
- Martin Doherty – IRA member
- Frank Duff – founder of the Legion of Mary
- Edward Duffy – Irish Fenian, Irish Republican Brotherhood
- Thomas Duffy – private, Madras Army; VC recipient (Indian Mutiny)
- Madeleine ffrench-Mullen – Irish revolutionary
- James Fitzmaurice – aviation pioneer
- Ethna Gaffney – first female professor at the Royal College of Surgeons in Ireland
- Francis Gleeson – Chaplain to the British Army and the Irish Free State
- Maud Gonne – nationalist campaigner, famed beauty and mother of Nobel and Lenin Peace Prize winner Seán MacBride, who is also buried in the grave Image of Maud Gonne & Seán MacBride's grave
- Edmund Dwyer Gray – Irish 19th century MP, son of Sir John Gray
- Sir John Gray – Irish 19th century MP. Image of Sir John Gray's gravestone
- Arthur Griffith – President of Dáil Éireann (January – August 1922)
- Joseph Patrick Haverty – Irish painter
- Tim Healy – 1st Governor-General of the Irish Free State. image of Tim Healy's grave.
- Denis Caulfield Heron – lawyer and politician
- Gerard Manley Hopkins – poet
- Sandie Jones – singer who represented Ireland in the Eurovision Song Contest 1972
- Peadar Kearney – composer of the Irish National Anthem, Amhrán na bhFiann
- Luke Kelly – singer and folk musician, founding member of The Dubliners
- Kitty Kiernan – fiancée of Michael Collins
- James Larkin – Irish trade union leader and founder of the Irish Labour Party, Irish Transport and General Workers Union (ITGWU) and Irish Citizen Army
- Richard Michael Levey – violinist, conductor, composer and music director at the Theatre Royal, Dublin
- Josie MacAvin – Oscar- and Emmy-winning set decorator and art director
- Seán MacBride – founder of Clann na Poblachta and a founder-member of Amnesty International
- Edward MacCabe – late 19th century Cardinal Archbishop of Dublin and Primate of Ireland Image of the elaborate monument to Cardinal MacCabe.
- Terence MacManus – Irish rebel and shipping agent
- James Patrick Mahon – Irish nationalist politician and mercenary
- Manchester Martyrs – cenotaph honouring 3 members of the Irish Republican Brotherhood known in history as the Manchester Martyrs who were in fact buried in the grounds of a British prison following their execution
- Countess Constance Markievicz – first woman elected to the British House of Commons and a minister in the first Irish government
- Dick McKee – member of the Irish Republican Army during the War of Independence
- Dermot Morgan – Irish satirist and star of Father Ted. Cremated in Glasnevin and interred at Deansgrange Cemetery.
- James Murray – lance corporal, British Army; VC recipient (First Boer War)
- Kate Cruise O'Brien – writer and publisher (not to be confused with Kate O'Brien, buried in Faversham Cemetery, England)
- Dáithí Ó Conaill – a founder member of the Provisional Irish Republican Army
- Daniel O'Connell – Irish political leader from 1820s to 1840s
- Patrick O'Donnell the Avenger – executed in 1883 in London for the assassination of the co-conspirator turncoat of the Phoenix Park murder, James Carey. A memorial in his honour stands in Glasnevin.
- Patrick Denis O'Donnell – Irish military historian, writer, and former UN peace-keeper
- Jeremiah O'Donovan Rossa – Fenian leader. Patrick Pearse's oration at his funeral in 1915 has gone down in history.
- Eoin O'Duffy – Chief of Staff of the Irish Republican Army and leader of The Blueshirts
- Elizabeth O'Farrell – Irish revolutionary and member of Cumann na mBan
- Thomas O'Hagan, 1st Baron O'Hagan – Lord Chancellor of Ireland
- Kevin O'Higgins – assassinated Vice-President of the Executive Council
- Seán T. O'Kelly – 2nd President of Ireland (1945–1959)
- John O'Leary – an Irish republican and a leading Fenian.
- John O'Mahony – a founder of the Irish Republican Brotherhood
- Ernie O'Malley – anti-Treaty IRA leader during the Irish Civil War
- James O'Mara – nationalist leader and member of the First Dáil
- Henry O'Neill – painter and archaeologist
- Christopher Palles – Chief Baron of the Irish Exchequer, often described as "the greatest of Irish judges"
- Charles Stewart Parnell – dominant Irish political leader from 1875 to 1891
- Thomas Matthew Ray – Irish nationalist
- Patrick Joseph (P.J.) Ruttledge – minister in Éamon de Valera's early governments
- Daniel D. Sheehan – first independent Irish labour MP
- Hanna Sheehy-Skeffington – founder of Irish Women's Franchise League
- Philip Smith – lance sergeant, British Army; VC recipient (Crimean War)
- Patrick James Smyth – journalist and politician
- John Sullivan – chief boatswain's mate, Royal Navy; VC recipient (Crimean War)
- David P. Tyndall – prominent Irish businessman who transformed the grocery business
- William Joseph Walsh – Roman Catholic Archbishop of Dublin
- Billy Whelan – Manchester United footballer who died in the Munich air disaster of 1958
