= All Saints Church, Grangegorman =

Church in Dublin, Ireland

All Saints, Grangegorman
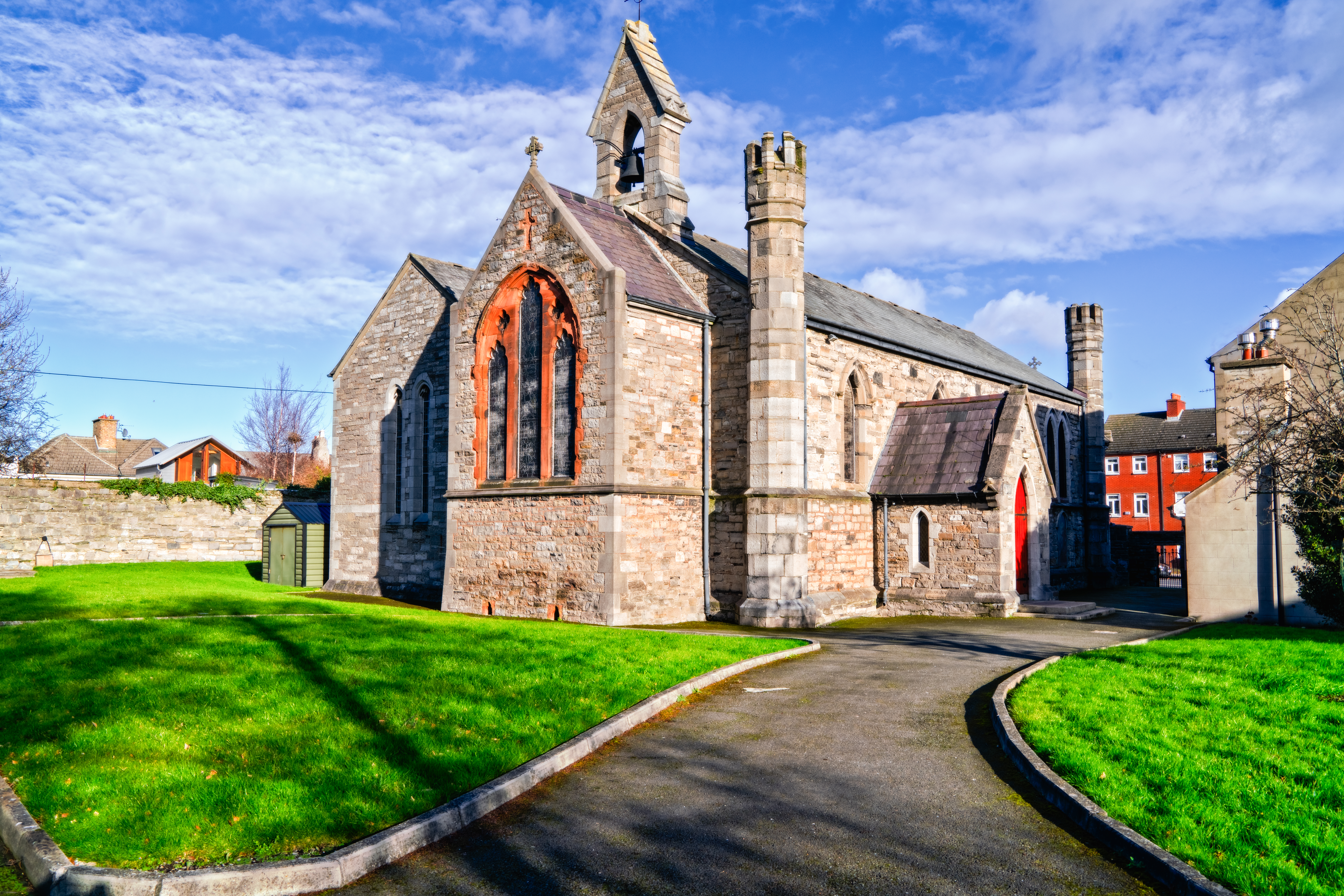

- 53.3582°N 6.2738°W
- Location: Phibsborough Road, Dublin
- Country: Ireland
- Denomination: Church of Ireland
- Churchmanship: Anglo-Catholic / High Church

History
- Founded: 1828
- Dedication: All Saints

Architecture
- Architect: John Semple (1828)

Administration
- Province: Province of Dublin
- Diocese: Diocese of Dublin and Glendalough

All Saints Church, Grangegorman is a Church of Ireland church located in Dublin, Ireland. It was built in 1828, to designs by John Semple, and formed as a parish in 1829 from the areas of St. Michan's and St. Paul's. It is a constituent member of the Christ Church Cathedral, Dublin Parish Group alongside St. Michan's Church, Dublin and St. Werburgh's Church, Dublin. This church in noteworthy on the basis that it is numbered among the first in Ireland to worship according to Tractarian Principles, and was the subject of protest and sanction by the Protestant community in Ireland in the 19th century.

== Architecture ==
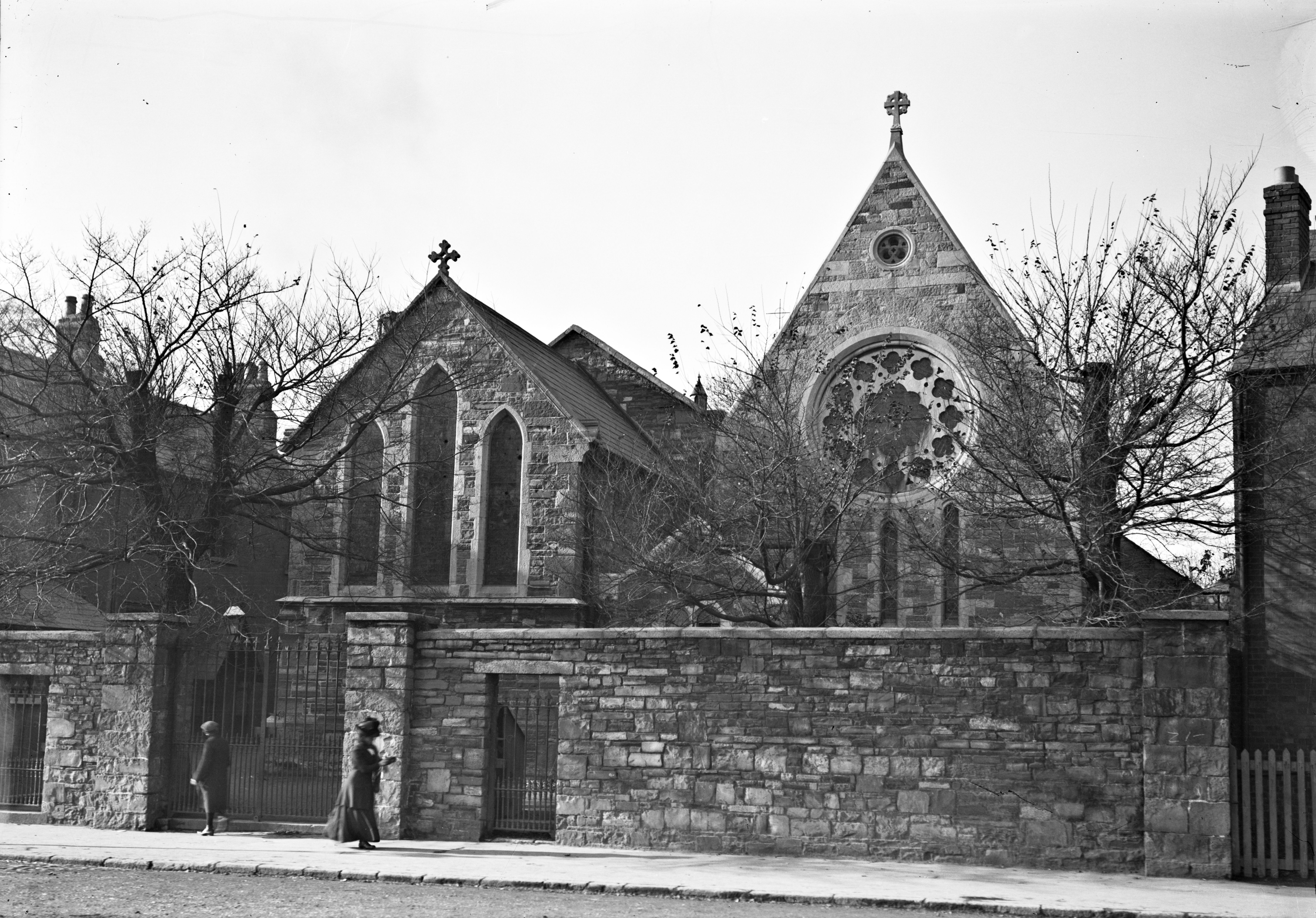
Church exterior in the early 20th century

The church, originally designed by John Semple, was later remodelled by Thomas Drew between 1856 and 1889 according to Tractarian principles. This amounted to the redesign of the chancel in 1856 and the addition of the baptistery in 1889. The building also boasts a fine number of stained glass windows designed by A. L. Moore, installed during the 1880s and 1890s. The church was devastated by fire in 1966; a number of notable features were lost, including the 19th-century roofing.

== Monuments ==
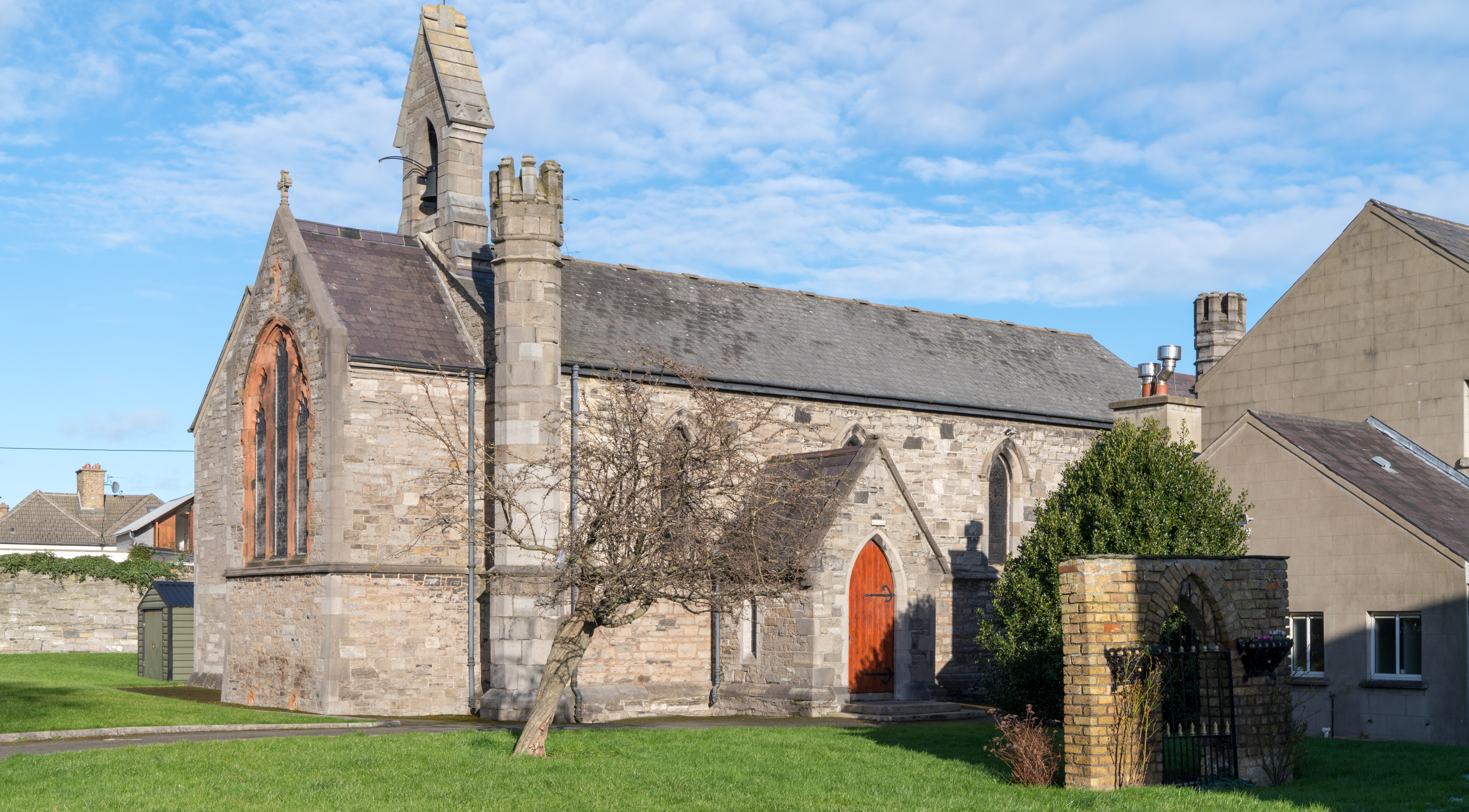
Church exterior and doorway

In 1920, a triptych war memorial was installed to commemorate those members of the parish who died in war. On the south-facing external wall of the church, a panel depicting St. Michael by An Túr Gloine artist Ethel Rhind was installed in 1921, associated with a World War I memorial located within the church. At the back of the church, a memorial to George Tyrrell was installed. Born into the community of All Saints, he later converted to Roman Catholicism and was ordained as a Jesuit priest before being excommunicated for modernist views challenging, amongst others, the doctrine of Papal Infallibility. When he was denied a Catholic burial the community of All Saints facilitated his funeral.

== Parish ==
Grangegorman parish was founded in what was at the time partly in the new electoral boundary for the north of the city and partly in the county of Dublin electoral area. It was formed out of those parts of the parishes of St. Michan, St. Paul, and St. George, which were in the area of Grangegorman.

All Saints Church, Grangegorman is a member of the Christ Church Cathedral, Dublin Parish Group along with St. Michan's Church, Dublin and St. Werburgh's Church, Dublin. The parish is considered as among the first Church of Ireland parishes to align itself with the Anglo-Catholic Movement or Oxford Movement along Tractarian principles. The small instances of ritualism, incomparable with that represented in England at the time, generated protests and led to "a fiery mob of young men" breaking up the services offered within the church on some occasions. Depicting the demise of the Oxford Movement in Ireland, Tyrrell wrote that the curiosity exhibited among the Dublin intellectual scene and among those graduates of Trinity College Dublin had worn off in the face of Home Rule.

== Organ ==
The organ was built by the firm Telford and Telford towards the end of the nineteenth century and was originally located in St. Philip's Church, Milltown. It was later relocated to the Church of St. Mary, Mary Street, before finally being transferred to its current location in 1986.

== Church choir ==
Consistent with the Anglo-Catholic principles of the ritual of All Saints church, the choir consists of robed adults and children who "lend their voice to the adornment of the Sacraments and Other Rites and Ceremonies to the use of the Church of Ireland for the purpose of the worship of the Lord in the beauty of holiness and the edification of the people". The choir traces its origins from the earliest days of the parish and records indicate that, while adult members were volunteers, the children were paid. It is reported that during the 1940s the children went on strike in pursuit of higher salaries. The repertoire of the choir extends from Gregorian Chant through polyphonic works from the sixteenth century to the present day.

== People associated with the church ==
Rev. Arthur Smith Adamson AM, infamous for winning "Case of the Rev. Arthur Smyth Adamson against the inhabitants of Grange-Gorman". Rev. Dr. William Maturin (a Tractarian) who served as Rector from 1843 until 1887, he was succeeded by Canon Henry Hogan who served from 1887 until 1923. Archbishop John Armstrong was first a priest in Grangegorman. Archdeacon Raymond Jenkins served from 1939 to 1976. Former Bishop Frederick Robert Willis ministered from 1966 to 1975. Recently Canon David Pierpoint, Rev. Roy Byrne and Rev. David MacDonnell served the church as part of the Christchurch Cathedral Group.
