= Michael G. Tubridy =

All-Ireland footballer and international showjumper

Mick Tubridy
Personal information
- Native name: Mícheál Ó Tiobraide (Irish)
- Born: 1922 Kilrush, County Clare, Ireland
- Died: 1954 (aged 31–32) Dublin, Ireland
- Occupation: Stud farm manager
- Height: 5 ft 9 in (175 cm)

Sport
- Sport: Gaelic football
- Position: Left wing-forward
Club
- Years: Club
- 1940s: Army
Inter-county
Years	County	Apps (scores)
1945	Cork	3 (1–3)
Inter-county titles
- Munster titles: 1
- All-Irelands: 1
- NFL: 0

Michael Gerard Tubridy (28 September 1922 – 16 April 1954) was an All-Ireland SFC-winning Gaelic footballer and an international showjumper.

Tubridy was born in Kilrush, County Clare, one of nine children of Patrick F. Tubridy (died 1947). He entered the Irish Army as a cadet in November 1941, serving at Ballincollig, County Cork.

He joined the Cork Gaelic football team, playing as a left wing-forward for the Cork senior team in 1945. Tubridy played for the team for just one season in the 1945 championship, winning a set of All-Ireland SFC and Munster SFC winner's medals. At club level Tubridy played with the Kilrush Shamrocks and Army clubs.

In 1945, he transferred to the Irish Army's Equitation School and achieved many showjumping successes on horses such as Bruree and Ballyneety.

After retiring from the army on 25 January 1954, he was manager of Joe McGrath's Trimblestown Stud Farm in Kildalkey, County Meath.

Tubridy was married to Dorothy (née Lawlor), known as Dot, and had one daughter, Aine. He died on 16 April 1954 following a riding accident at Trimblestown and was buried at Glasnevin Cemetery on 19 April 1954.

The Kilrush Shamrocks playing field is officially named "Captain Tubridy Memorial Park" in his honour, although it is affectionately known as "the Cricket Field". It is located 1 mile south of Kilrush on the road to the Killimer car ferry.

== Dorothy Tubridy ==
Through her husband's equestrian activities, Dorothy ('Dot') Tubridy became friends with Ethel Kennedy, and after his death she remained close to the entire Kennedy family. She became a brand ambassador for Waterford Crystal and Donegal Carpets in the United States, and was instrumental in encouraging the visit of president John F. Kennedy to Ireland in June 1963. Dot also became a writer and a radio and TV commentator, and was a well-known celebrity in 1960s Ireland.

Some sources have described Dot as an aunt of broadcaster Ryan Tubridy, while Ryan Tubridy himself, in his biography of John F. Kennedy, referred to Dot as his cousin. In fact, there is no apparent immediate family connection between Ryan Tubridy and either Dorothy (née Lawlor) or her late husband Capt. Mick Tubridy.
