= Black church (disambiguation) =

The Black church is the body of Christian congregations and denominations that minister predominantly or exclusively to African Americans.

Black church may also refer to:

- Biserica Neagră, a church in Brașov, Romania
- St Mary's, Dublin (chapel of ease), a former chapel of ease in Ireland
