= Rathmines =

Inner suburb of Dublin, Ireland

Rathmines Ráth Maonais (Irish)
- Inner suburb
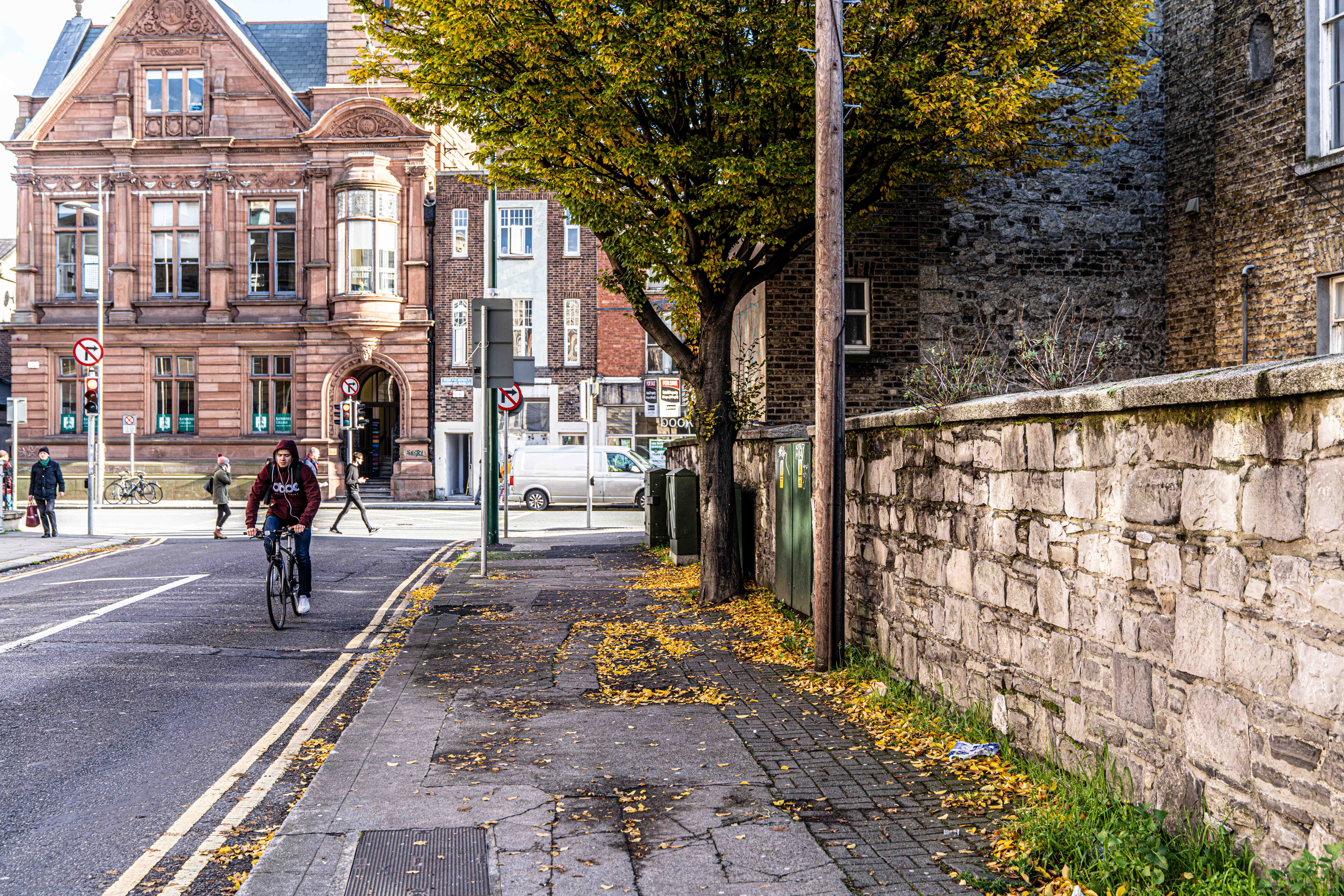
- Rathmines Road viewed from Leinster Road

- Location in Ireland Rathmines (Dublin)
- Coordinates: 53.3225°N 6.2657°W
- Country: Ireland
- Province: Leinster
- County: County Dublin
- Local authority: Dublin City Council
- Dáil constituency: Dublin Bay South
- European Parliament: Dublin
- Elevation: 31 m (102 ft)

Rathmines (/ˈræθˌmaɪnz/; Irish: Ráth Maonais, meaning 'ringfort of Maonas') is an inner suburb on the Southside of Dublin in Ireland. It begins at the southern side of the Grand Canal and stretches along the Rathmines Road as far as Rathgar to the south, Ranelagh to the east, and Harold's Cross to the west. It is situated in the city's D06 postal district.

Rathmines is a commercial and social hub and was well known across Ireland as "Flatland"—an area where subdivided large Georgian and Victorian houses provided rented accommodation to newly arrived junior civil servants and third-level students from outside the city from the 1930s. However, in more recent times, Rathmines has diversified its housing stock and many historic houses formerly divided into often tiny flats and bedsits have in a process of gentrifying been re-amalgamated into single-family homes. Rathmines gained a reputation as a "Dublin Belgravia" in the 19th century.

== Name ==
Rathmines is an Anglicisation of the Irish Ráth Maonais, meaning "ringfort of Maonas"/"fort of Maonas". The name Maonas is perhaps derived from Maoghnes or the Norman name de Meones, after the de Meones family who settled in Dublin about 1280; Elrington Ball states that the earlier version of the name was Meonesrath, which supports the theory that it was named after the family. Like many of the surrounding areas, it arose from a fortified structure which would have been the centre of civic and commercial activity from the Norman invasion of Ireland in the 12th century. Rathgar, Baggotrath and Rathfarnham are other areas of Dublin whose placenames derive from a similar root.

== History ==
=== Origins ===
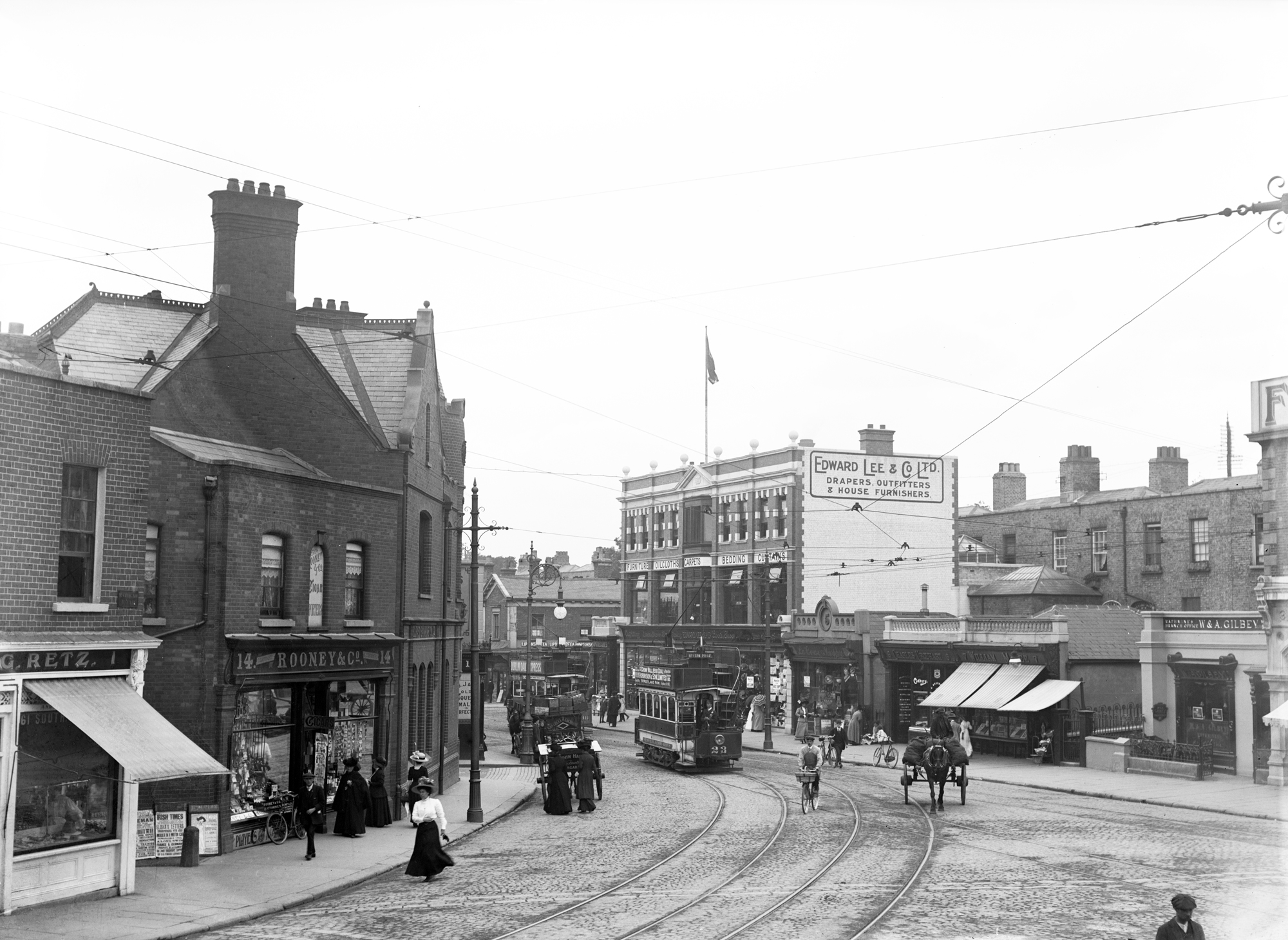
Rathmines c. 1911

Rathmines has a history stretching back to the 14th century. At this time, Rathmines and the surrounding hinterland were part of the ecclesiastical lands called Cuallu or Cuallan, later the vast Parish of Cullenswood, which gave its name to a nearby area. Cuallu is mentioned in local surveys from 1326 as part of the manor of St. Sepulchre (the estate, or rather liberty, of the Archbishop of Dublin, whose seat as a Canon of St. Patrick's Cathedral takes its name from this). There is some evidence of an established settlement around a rath as far back as 1350. Rathmines is part of the Barony of Uppercross, one of the many baronies surrounding the old city of Dublin, bound as it was by walls, some of which are still visible. In more recent times, Rathmines was a popular suburb of Dublin, attracting the wealthy and powerful seeking refuge from the poor living conditions of the city from the middle of the 19th century. A substantial mansion, generally called Rathmines Old Castle, was built in the seventeenth century, probably at present-day Palmerston Park, and rebuilt in the eighteenth; no trace of it survives today.

Rathmines is arguably best known historically for a bloody battle that took place there in 1649, during the Cromwellian conquest of Ireland, leading to the death of perhaps up to 5,000 people. The Battle of Rathmines took place on 2 August 1649 and led to the routing of Royalist forces in Ireland shortly after this time. Some have compared the Battle of Rathmines – or sometimes Baggotrath – as equal in political importance to England's Battle of Naseby. The battle brought a swift end to the ongoing Royalist Siege of Dublin.

In the early 1790s, the Grand Canal was constructed on the northern edge of Rathmines, connecting Rathmines with Portobello via the La Touch Bridge (which through popular usage became better known as Portobello Bridge).

The population was 2,429 inhabitants at the time of the 1841 census.

For several hundred years Rathmines was the location of a "spa" – in fact, a spring – the water of which was said to have health-giving properties. It attracted people with all manner of ailments to the area. In the 19th century, it was called the "Grattan Spa", as it was located on property once belonging to Henry Grattan, close to Portobello Bridge. The "spa" gradually fell into a state of neglect as the century progressed, until disputes arose between those who wished to preserve it and those (mainly developers) who wished to get rid of it altogether. In 1872 a Dr. O'Leary, who held a high estimate of the water quality, reported that the "spa" was in "a most disgraceful state of repair", upon which the developer and alderman Frederick Stokes sent samples to the medical inspector, Dr. Cameron, for analysis. Dr. Cameron, a great lover of authority, reported: "It was, in all probability, merely the drainings of some ancient disused sewer, not a chalybeate spring." Access to the site was blocked up and the once popular "spa" faded from public memory.

Dublin Rathmines was a parliamentary county constituency at Westminster from 1918 to 1922. It returned Unionist candidate Maurice Dockrell as its MP in 1918, elected on a majority. Dockrell was the only Unionist elected in a geographical constituency outside Ulster.

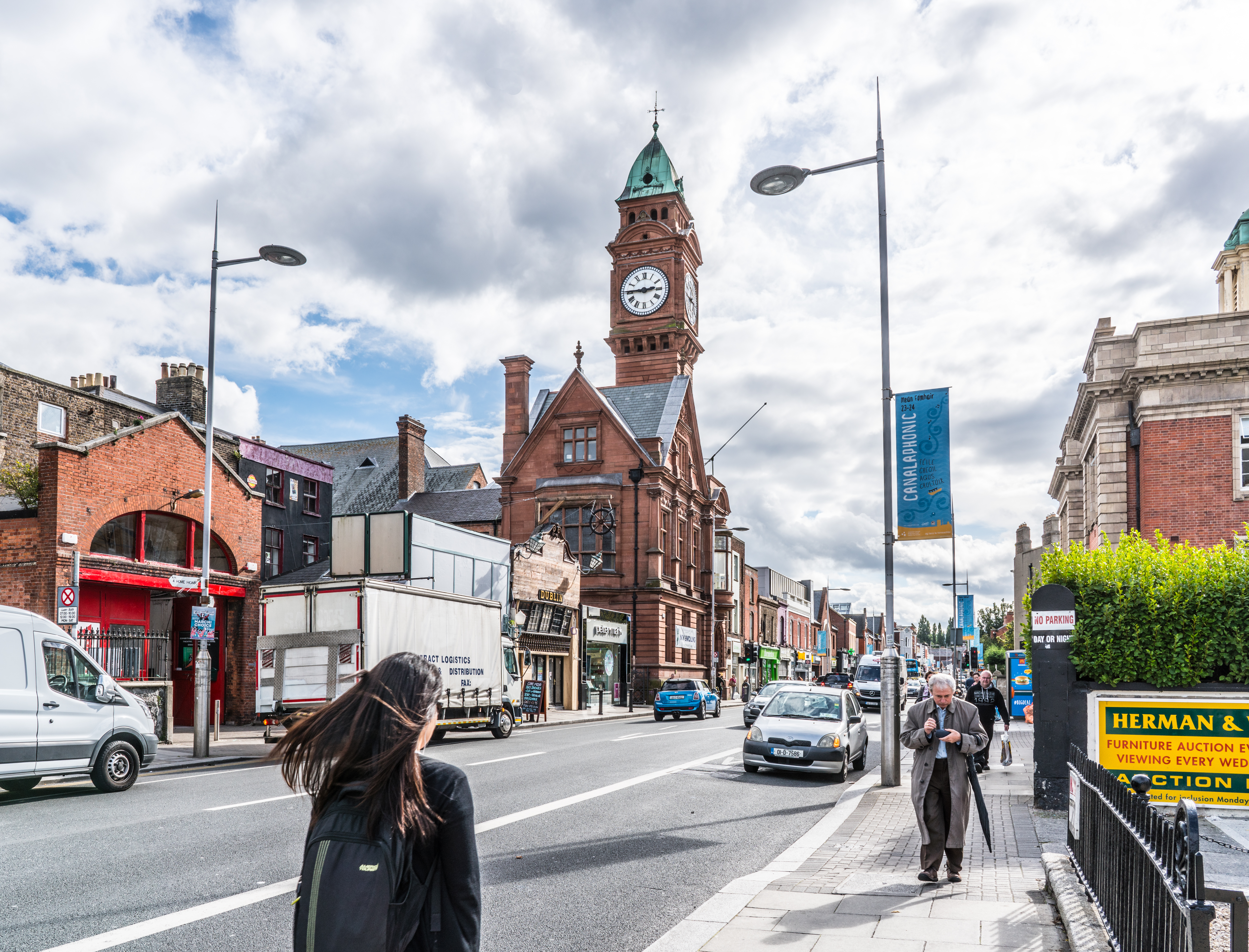
Rathmines Town Hall in Rathmines Road

=== Easter Rising, War of Independence & Civil War ===
On 25 April 1916, during the Easter Rising, Captain John Bowen-Colthurst, an officer of the 3rd battalion Royal Irish Rifles, went on a raiding party in Rathmines holding Francis Sheehy-Skeffington as hostage. At Rathmines Road, he shot dead 19-year-old James Joseph Coade of 28 Mountpleasant Avenue. Coade had been attending a Sodality meeting at the nearby Catholic Church of Our Lady of Refuge. Sheehy-Skeffington was later shot dead in Portobello Barracks.

Rathmines Church was used as a weapons store during the War of Independence. On 26 January 1920, a fire started at the electrical switchboard in the vestry. There were reports of several members of 'A' Company of the IRA Dublin Brigade entering the church during the fire to retrieve the weapons. The fire caused £30-35,000 worth of damage and completely destroyed the dome.

During the Irish Civil War on 20 December 1922 Séamus Dwyer, a pro-treaty Sinn Féin politician, was shot dead in his shop at 5 Rathmines Terrace. On 23 March 1923 Thomas O'Leary, a member of the anti-Treaty IRA, was found dead and riddled with bullets outside of Tranquilla Convent (now Tranquilla Park). In 1933 a Celtic cross was erected in his memory at the location.

On 28 January 1928, IRA assassin Timothy Coughlin was himself shot dead on the Dartry Road.

=== Rathmines Township ===
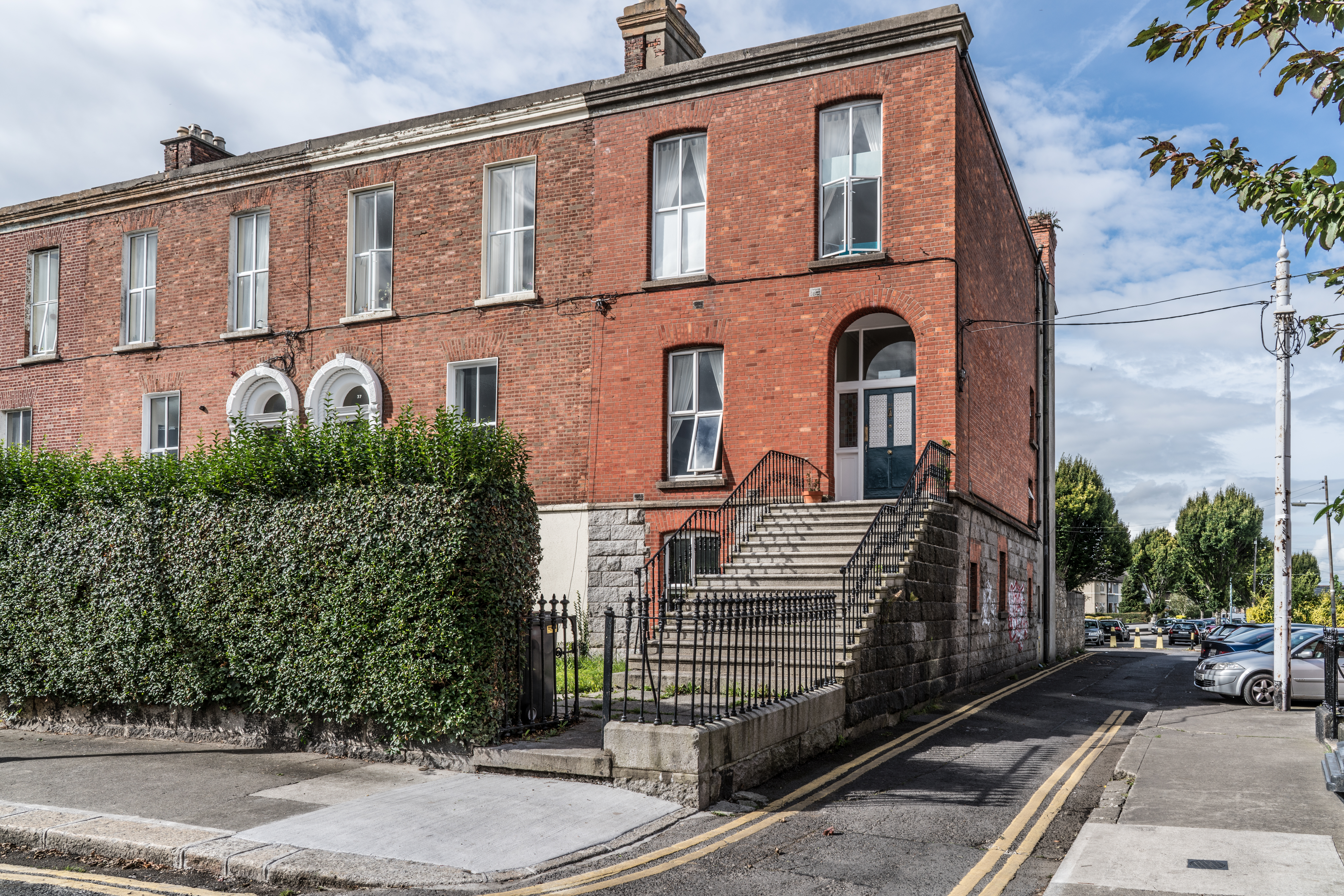
Grosvenor Square, Rathmines

The Rathmines Township was created by an Act of Parliament in 1847. The area was later renamed Rathmines and Rathgar and expanded to take in the areas of Rathgar, Ranelagh, Sallymount and Milltown. The township was initially responsible only for sanitation, but its powers were extended over time to cover most functions of local government. It became an urban district under the Local Government (Ireland) Act 1898, but was still usually called a "township". Initially, the council was made up of local businessmen and other eminent figures; the franchise was extended in 1899 and the membership changed accordingly.

Rathmines Town Hall is still one of Rathmines's most prominent buildings with its clock tower (because the clock is famously inaccurate and has four large apparently unsynchronised clock faces (i.e., they sometimes show different times), it is known locally as the "Four Faced Liar".)

The township was incorporated into the City of Dublin in 1930, and its functions were taken over by Dublin Corporation, now known as Dublin City Council. Kimmage–Rathmines is a local electoral area of Dublin City Council, electing six councillors; the boundaries of the electoral areas in Rathmines have varied over the years.

== Places of interest ==
Cathal Brugha Barracks (known in the past as Portobello Barracks) is a large army barracks which is home to many units of the Irish Army including, the 2 Brigade and the 7th Infantry Battalion. Portobello GAA are based on their pitch on Leinster Road and fields adult teams in Gaelic football and hurling which serve Rathmines for GAA.

Rathmines Library was opened on 24 October 1913 following a grant of £8,500 from Andrew Carnegie, to a design by architect, Frederick Hicks.

== Churches ==
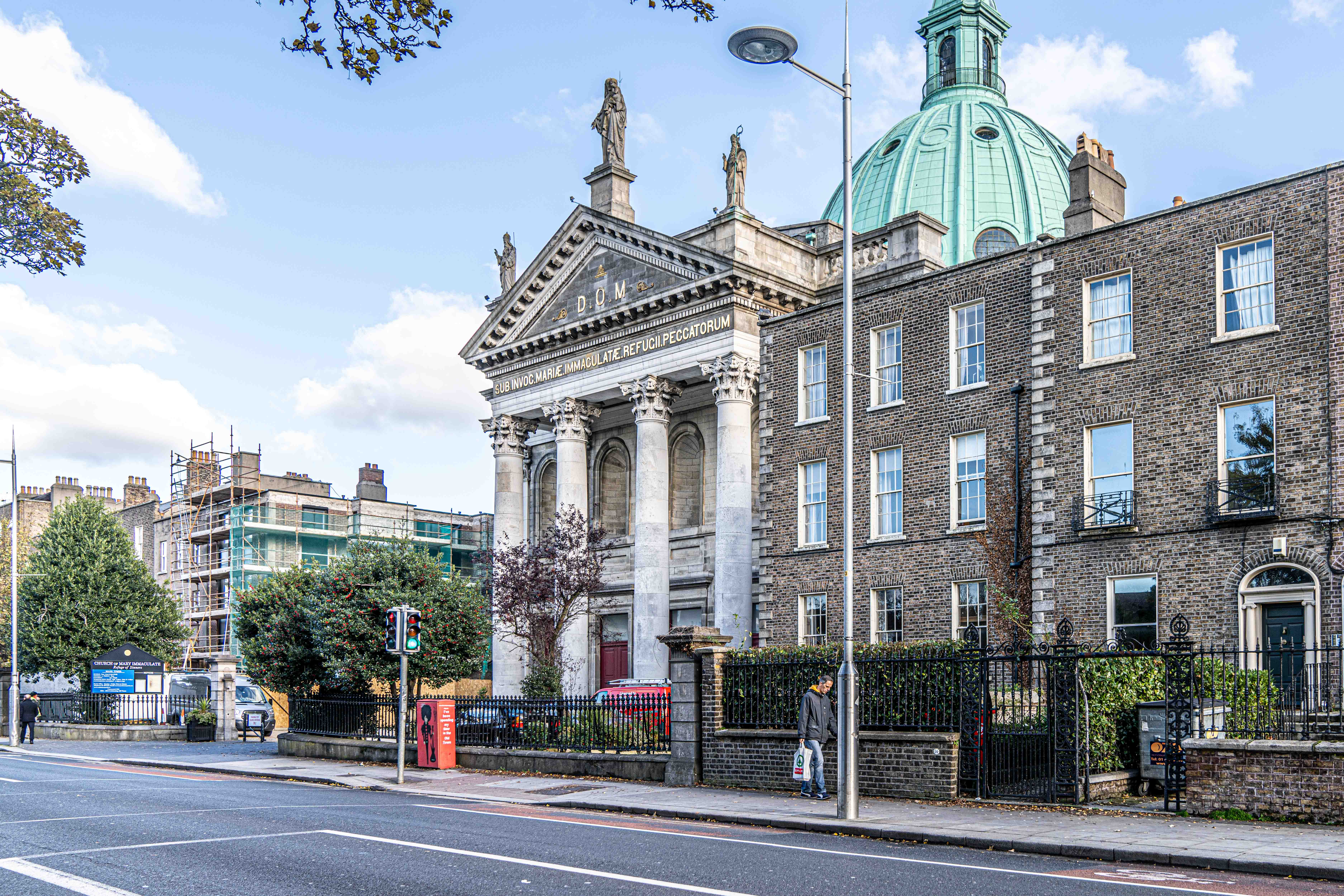
The neoclassical Mary Immaculate church with Georgian townhouses nearby

The green copper oxide dome of Mary Immaculate, Refuge of Sinners Church is a prominent landmark. The original dome was destroyed in a fire in 1920 and replaced by the current one when reopened in 1922. The dome was to be used in St Petersburg but the political and social upheaval in that city caused it to be diverted to Dublin.

The Holy Trinity Church (Church of Ireland) was designed by John Semple (1801–1882) in the Gothic Revival style and consecrated on 1 June 1828. Constructed of Black Calp, a local limestone that turns black in the rain, the Church was one of two in Dublin to be known as the 'Black Church,' (the other also being designed by Semple and in St. Mary's Place).

Rathmines is also the location of Grosvenor Road Baptist Church.

== Education ==
There are two secondary schools in Rathmines, St Mary's College and St Louis High School. The former is a fee-paying boys school run by the Congregation of the Holy Spirit, and the later is a girls school originally established by the Sisters of St. Louis and now under the trusteeship of The Le Cheile Schools Trust.

There are four primary schools including St Mary's Junior School (co-located with St Mary's College), St Louis Primary School, John Scottus National School and Kildare Place National School. The latter is a Church of Ireland-sponsored primary school situated on the grounds of the former Church of Ireland College of Education on Rathmines Road Upper.

Rathmines College of Further Education is located in the Town Hall.

== Retail ==
On 14 September 2014, the old Swan cinema was upgraded, refurbished, and enhanced, at a cost of nearly €8 million. From the original seating capacity of 258, it was expanded to 1,519, over a total of eight movie screens. This has multiple screens, it shows up-to-date movies and features 3D movies. In October 2017, the Stella Cinema, a vintage cinema popular in the 1980s was refurbished and reopened, offering classic films and blockbusters.

== Transport ==
From the 1850s, horse-drawn omnibuses provided transport from Rathmines to the city centre. Portobello Bridge, which had a steep incline, was often a problem for the horses, which led to the fatal accident of 1861.

On 6 October 1871 work was commenced on the Dublin tram system on Rathmines Road, just before Portobello Bridge, and a horse-drawn tram service was in place the following year. The following year also the long-awaited (since the 1861 accident) improvements to Portobello Bridge were carried out, the Tramway Company paying one-third of the total cost of £300.

Rathmines was once served by Rathmines and Ranelagh railway station on the Harcourt Street railway line. The station opened on 16 July 1896 and finally closed on 1 January 1959.

Today Rathmines is served by the Luas light rail system: Ranelagh on the Green Line is the most convenient for access to the main street, while the Charlemont, Beechwood (which is near the former railway station) and Cowper stops are also within walking distance of the area.

Dublin Bus routes S2, 14, 15, 15A, 15B, 65, 65B, 80, 82 and 142 serve Rathmines. The area is also served by the Dublin Bus Nitelink route 49N on Friday and Saturday nights and on public holidays. The Dublin Express route 783 runs from Rathmines to Dublin Airport.

== Gallery ==
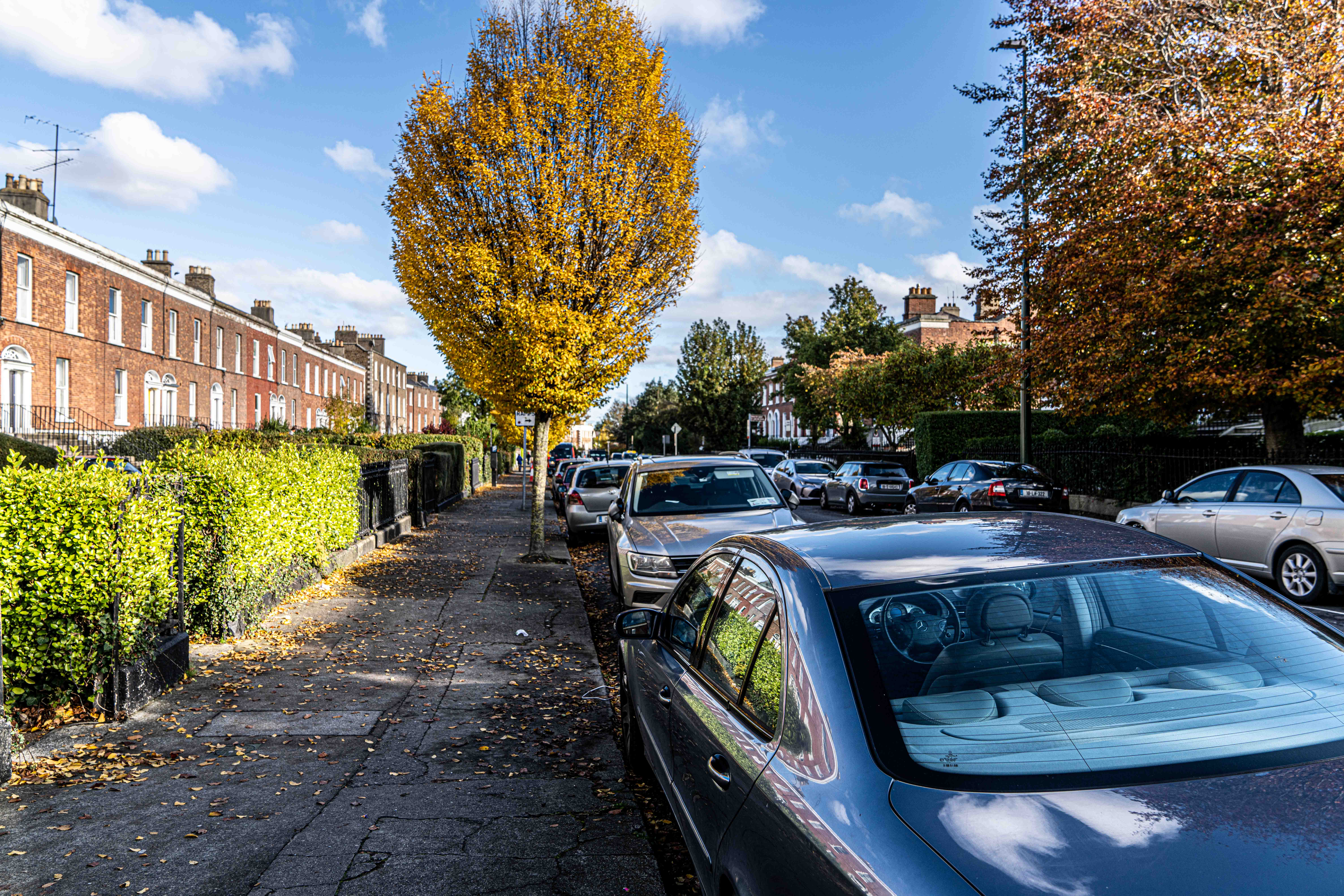
Townhouses on Leinster Road, Rathmines

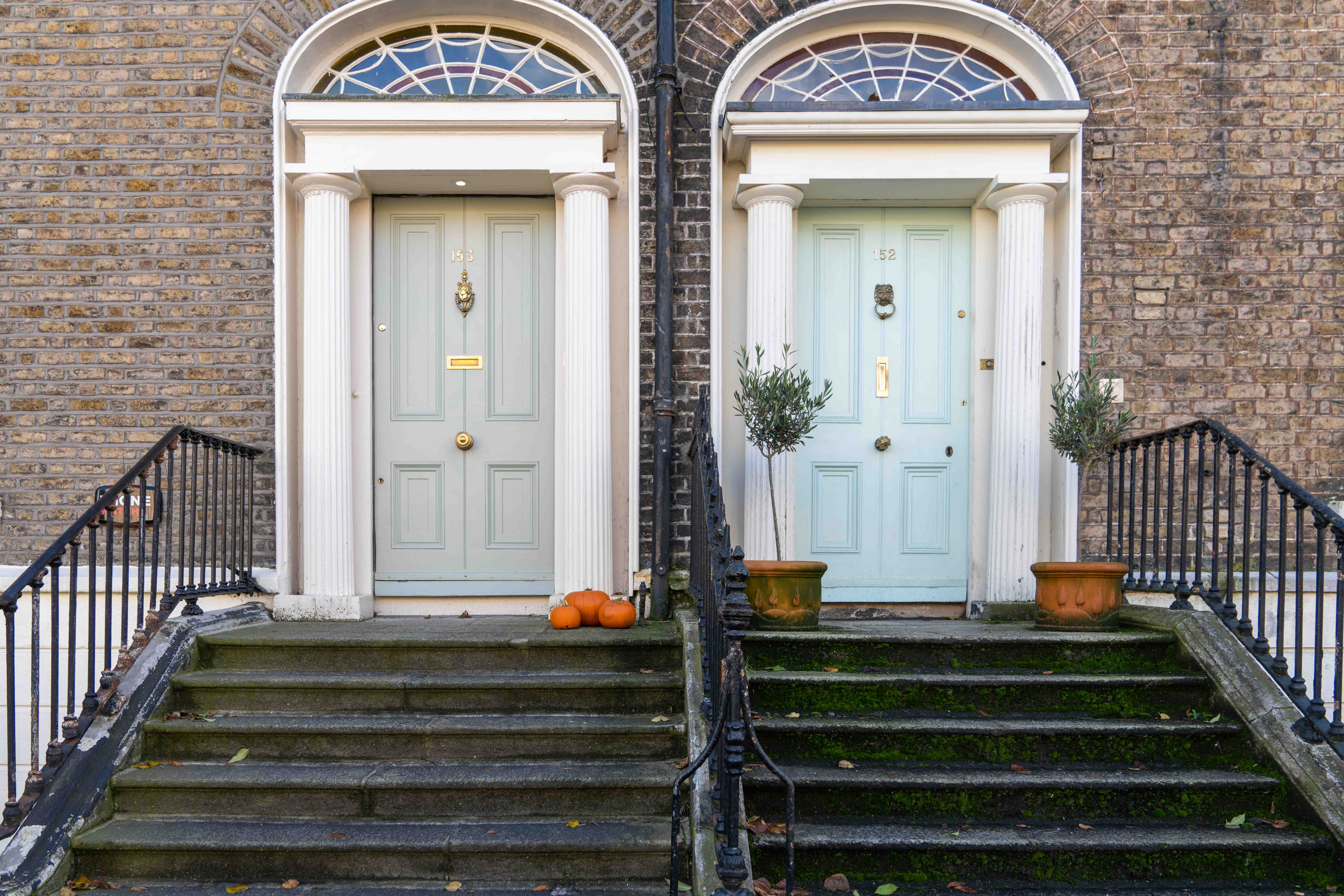
Georgian doorways in Rathmines

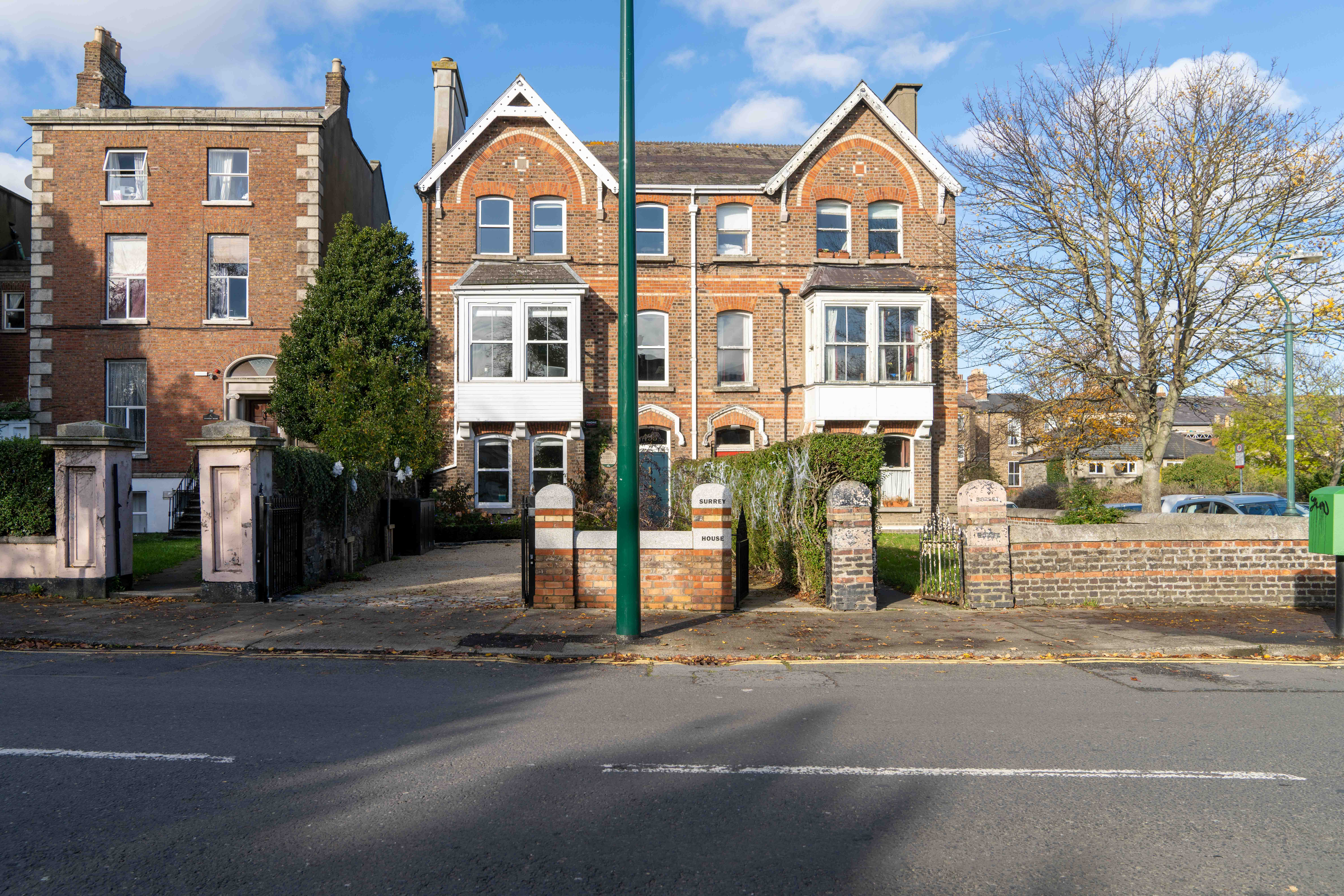
Houses on Leinster Road, Rathmines

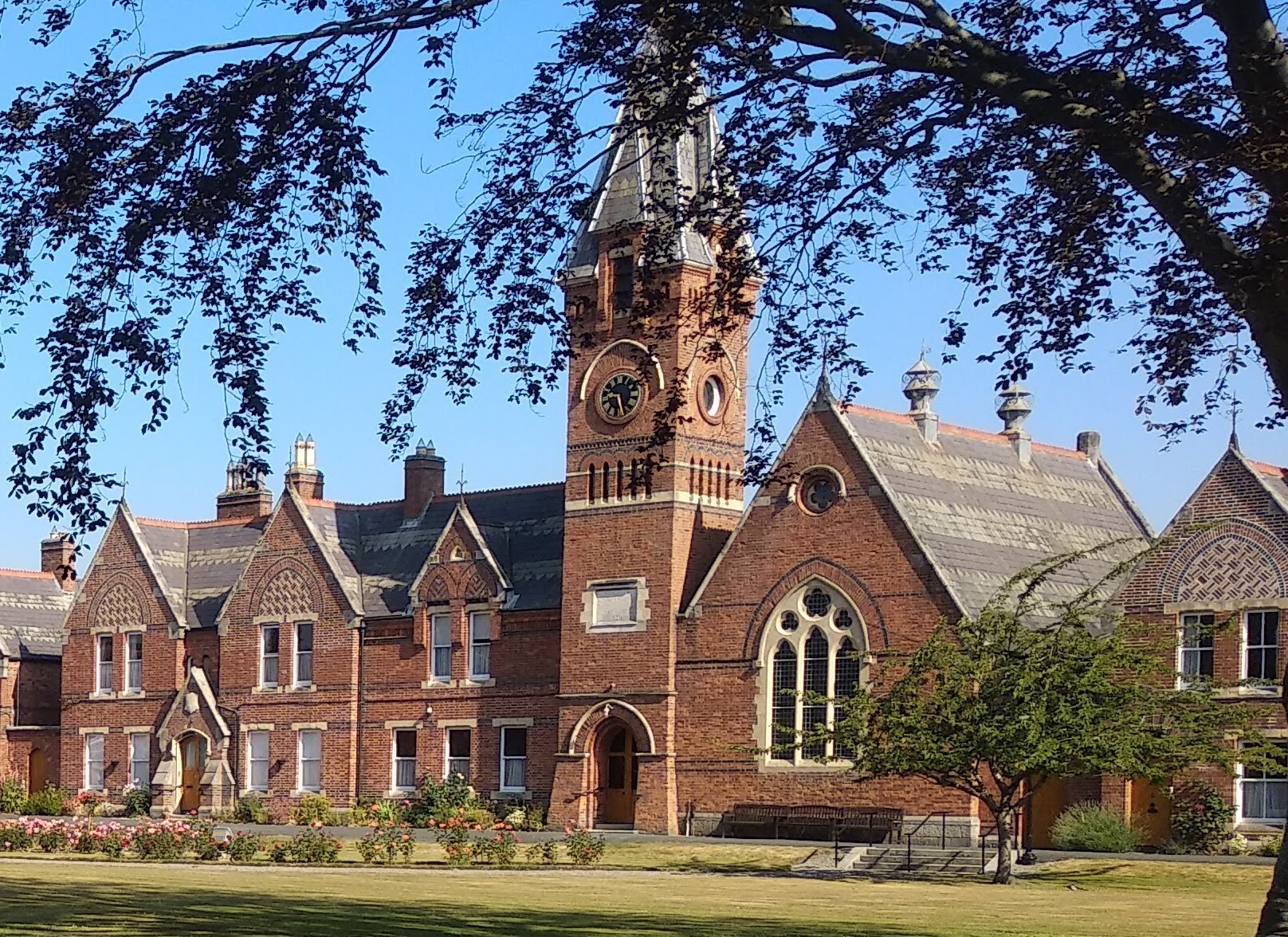
The Mageough Home

== Notable people ==
- Cathal Brugha, Irish nationalist, lived on Rathmines Road
- Mamie Cadden, midwife, backstreet abortionist and convicted murderer, operated a maternity nursing home, St Maelruin's, at 183 Lower Rathmines Road
- Martin Cahill (1949-1994) aka The General, career criminal, lived in Cowper Downs prior to his murder in 1994
- Michael Cleary (priest) was living on Leinster Road, Rathmines when the controversy about his child was first reported
- Nora Connolly O'Brien, second daughter of James Connolly, was an activist and writer; she was also a member of the Irish Senate, and lived on Belgrave Square
- Matt Cooper (Irish journalist), resident
- Frederick William Cumberland (1820–1881), architect, railway manager and politician, grew up in Rathmines; his father Thomas was employed at Dublin Castle
- Andrew Cunningham, 1st Viscount Cunningham of Hyndhope, British admiral of the Second World War
- Sidney Gifford Czira (1889–1974), Irish journalist, broadcaster, writer and revolutionary born in Rathmines and lived at Cambridge Road.
- Vincent Dowling, Director of the Arts, was born in Rathmines
- Séamus Dwyer, Sinn Féin TD in the Second Dáil, Pro-Treaty candidate in 1922 General Election, shot dead in his shop at 5 Rathmines Terrace on 20 December 1922
- Madeleine ffrench-Mullen (30 December 1880 – 26 May 1944) was an Irish revolutionary and labour activist who took part in the Easter Rising in Dublin in 1916
- Paddy Finucane, Second World War fighter pilot, was born in Rathmines
- Grace Gifford, an artist and cartoonist who was active in the Republican movement, was born in Rathmines; she married Joseph Plunkett in 1916 only a few hours before he was executed
- Stephen Gwynn Protestant Nationalist MP, writer, poet and journalist lived at Palmerstown Road
- Lafcadio Hearn, ghost-story writer who settled in Japan, was brought up in Rathmines
- Sean Hogan married Christina Butler at Our lady Refuge of Sinners Church in Rathmines, 24 February 1925
- Rosamund Jacob, suffragist, republican and writer lived at Belgrave Square and Charleville Road
- James Joyce was born at 41 Brighton Square and spent some of his childhood at 23 Castlewood Avenue
- Thomas Goodwin Keohler (1873-1942), poet, journalist and friend of James Joyce lived at 12 Charleville Road
- Aine Lawlor, RTÉ journalist
- The Earl of Longford had a large house in the Grosvenor park area of the Leinster road between Rathmines and Harold's Cross, that was demolished and replaced with a modern housing estate in recent decades
- Kathleen Lynn, 1874–1955, Sinn Féin politician, activist and medical doctor lived and practised on Belgrave Road, Rathmines
- Éamonn MacThomáis, 1927–2002, born in Rathmines, was an author, broadcaster, historian, Republican, advocate of the Irish language and lecturer, noted for numerous RTÉ documentaries on his native Dublin
- Constance Markievicz, Irish revolutionary. In 1903 after a visit to Ukraine, she and her husband Casimir Markievicz returned to live in a house provided by Constance's mother in Rathmines to bring up her daughter Maeve and stepson Stanislaus
- John Mitchel was living with his family at 8 Ontario Terrace when he was arrested in 1848
- Conor Cruise O'Brien was born in 1917 in Rathmines, the only child of Francis Cruise O'Brien, a journalist who worked for the Freeman's Journal, and Kathleen Sheehy
- Brian O'Driscoll, Irish rugby player, lives in Rathmines
- Walter Osborne, a famous Irish impressionist painter, was born at 5 Castlewood Avenue
- Seumas O'Sullivan, writer, was born on Charleston Avenue and the family pharmacy operated from 30 Rathmines Road
- Edward Pakenham, 6th Earl of Longford Irish Nationalist, Senator and writer
- Arthur Alcock Rambaut, astronomer, educated at Rathmines School
- Thomas Matthew Ray (1801-1881), Irish nationalist, living in Rathmines when he died
- George William Russell, Irish nationalist and mystic, educated at Rathmines School
- Michael Scott (1905–1989), modernist architect, lived with his family at Leinster Road West in the 1920s while serving his apprenticeship.
- Johnny Sexton, Irish rugby player, lives in Rathmines
- Francis Sheehy-Skeffington, suffragist, pacifist and writer, lived in 11 Grosvenor Place Rathmines
- Hanna Sheehy-Skeffington, suffragette and Irish nationalist, lived in 11 Grosvenor Place Rathmines
- Owen Sheehy-Skeffington, university lecturer and senator, spent early childhood in 11 Grosvenor Place Rathmines
- Dora Sigerson Shorter, poet, spent some of her childhood at Richmond Hill
- Annie M. P. Smithson, novelist, nurse and Nationalist, lived at 12 Richmond Hill until her death
- John Millington Synge, dramatist, lived here from February to April in 1908
- George William Torrance, composer of church music
- Elizabeth Mary Troy (1914–2011), obstetrician
- Maev-Ann Wren, journalist, economist, and author, grew up in Rathmines
- Robert Wynne, 1760–1838, built Rathmines Castle c. 1820
- Ella Young, poet and Celtic mythologist lived in Grosvenor Square

== See also ==
- List of towns and villages in Ireland
