= Church of Ireland Theological Institute =

Anglican seminary in Dublin, Ireland

Coordinates: 53.3031°N 6.2684°W

- (Irish: Institiúid Diagachta Eaglais na hÉireann)
- Former names: Church of Ireland Theological College, COI Divinity School; Divinity Hostel.
- Motto: "Growth, Unity and Service"
- Established: 2007
- Religious affiliation: Church of Ireland (Anglican)
- Academic affiliations: University of Dublin
- Director: Maurice Elliot
- Location: Churchtown, Dublin 14, Ireland
- Campus: Suburban
- Website: theologicalinstitute.ie

The Church of Ireland Theological Institute (formerly the Church of Ireland Theological College) is responsible for ministerial formation and lay training within the Church of Ireland. It is located in Churchtown in Dublin. The Church of Ireland, Representative Church Body (RCB) Library and archives, are also housed on the CITI Campus.

== History ==
Traditionally Church of Ireland clergy were trained for the priesthood by attending Trinity College Dublin, studying at the divinity school. In 1873, following the Dublin University Act, Trinity officially became a non-denominational university. While most Penal Laws had by that time been abolished, and the Church of Ireland had been disestablished in 1871, nevertheless, the University Bill continued the practice of anti-Catholicism, while the Irish Church Act 1869 disestablished the church, scholars, fellows and professors of the college were still required to be Anglicans. In 1911 an arrangement was formalised by which the House of Bishops and the college board governed the divinity school. In 1913 the "Divinity Hostel" was set up in two buildings in Mountjoy Square, Dublin, initially housing 15 students. The Rev. Ernest Lewis-Crosby allowed his property on Mountjoy Square to be used by the Hostel. In 1961 the Church of Ireland RCB purchased Fetherstonhaugh House in Rathgar, Fetherstonhaugh Convalescent Home for the Adelaide Hospital, Dublin was built by architect George P. Beater (1850-1928) in 1894, following the addition of a residential wing by architect Ian Roberts, the Divinity Hostel, moved there in 1963, and was officially opened in 1964.. In 1969, the Church of Ireland Library was moved to the site of the Divinity Hostel, and a number of other archives of Church of Ireland organisations are held here.

Following the sudden death of warden Fr. Michael Ferrar in December 1960, he was succeeded by the Rev. John Simpson Brown, who was director of Education for Church of Ireland, and also held the position of Professor of Pastoral Theology at Trinity College.

Over the years as the Church of Ireland bishops' presence in the governance of Trinity diminished (where before 1980 as members of the board of the divinity school, the bishops could nominate the professors of theology), the divinity school at Trinity has been effectively replaced by the non-denominational School of Religious Studies and Theology.

In 1980 the Church of Ireland Theological College was set up in the Divinity Hostel, which had moved to Rathgar in 1964. In 2007 Church of Ireland clerical training was reconstituted into the current institute.

Following a report commissioned by the bishops and proposals to the synod (which were accepted), the institute was formed in 2007 out of the Church of Ireland Theological College to modernize the training of Church of Ireland clergy and other people for lay ministry. The Revd Maurice Elliot was appointed the director of the institute succeeding Rev Dr Adrian Empey who was principal of the college since 2001. Rev. James Hartin served as principal from 1980 to 1989 and Rev. Canon Professor John R Bartlet served as principal from 1989 until 2001.

In 2019, the institute marked the 150th anniversary of the Irish Church Act 1869, which led to the disestablishment of the Church of Ireland and, along with the University Act, resulted in the foundation of what would become the Institute, by hosting a colloquium.

== Wardens, principals, directors ==
- The Rev. Canon William Elder George Ormsby Vandeleur (1928-1934), warden of Divinity Hostel, Mountjoy Square
- The Rev. Raymond G. F. Jenkins (1935-1939)
- The Rev. Michael Lloyd Ferrar (1939-1960)
- The Rev. Canon John S. Brown (1961-1980) known as warden of Divinity Hostel, Mountjoy Square, then Churchtown
- The Rev. Canon James Hartin (1980-1989) - known as principal, he was previously sub-warden of Divinity Hostel
- The Rev. Canon Prof. John R. Bartlet (1989-2001)
- The Rev. Canon Adrian Empey (2001-2008)
- The Rev. Canon Maurice Elliot (2008–present) known as director since 2007

== Courses ==
The institute has maintained the links with the University of Dublin. The Master in Theological Studies degree was first offered in conjunction with Trinity College, Dublin in 2009, replacing the B.Th. degree which was offered until 2010. The memorandum of understanding with Trinity was revised in 2018. The Institute also offers a Certificate in Christian Theology and Practice (CCTP), and is run through the Church of Ireland and Trinity College Dublin. This course is a prerequisite for ordinands hoping to study for the M.Th., and is also used for the training of lay readers within the Church. This lay readers course is a combination of distant learning (online), and contact time in CITI, and in the Diocese.

The Church of Ireland Certificate in third level Chaplaincy course run from CITI, was awarded in 2016.

The CITI also hosts retreats and a number of seminars and conferences, e.g. the Annual Irish Preachers Conference.

== Braemor Studies ==
Braemor Studies is an annual publication from the Institute, published by Church of Ireland Publishing. it was set up to promote publication of Church of Ireland related content.
