= E. J. Conway =

Irish biochemist

- Born: Edward Joseph Conway; 3 July 1894
- Died: 29 December 1968 (aged 74)
- Awards: FRS (1947)
- Scientific career
- Institutions: University College Dublin

Edward Joseph Conway FRS (3 July 1894 – 29 December 1968) was an Irish biochemist known for works pertaining to electrolyte physiology and analytical chemistry.

== Early life and education ==
Edward Joseph Conway was born on 3 July 1894 in Nenagh, North Tipperary. He attended the Christian Brothers' School at Nenagh where he earned sixth place in the whole of Ireland for the junior grade of the Intermediate Board examinations, qualifying for prizes in experimental science, mathematics and modern literature. He chose the science scholarship award and attended Blackrock College then University College Dublin (UCD), graduating M.Sc. after winning a studentship to the University of Frankfurt am Main, where he was awarded D.Sc.

He returned to Ireland to become the first Professor of Biochemistry and Pharmacology at University College Dublin in 1932, a post he held until 1963.

== Research ==
E. J. Conway was one of Ireland's most distinguished scientists; he was a world authority on electrolyte physiology, and in general on the physiology of the inorganic constituents of living tissue. He published over 120 papers, as well as two books: Microdiffusion Analysis and Volumetric Error and The Biochemistry of Gastric Acid Secretion.

His research focussed on renal function between 1920-1937, ionic balance of tissue, specifically muscle and chemical evolution of the ocean between 1937-1945, and acid secretion by yeast and gastric mucosa from 1945 until his retirement in 1963.

== Notable students ==
Ethna Gaffney, first female professor at the Royal College of Surgeons in Ireland.

== Awards ==
Conway was elected a Fellow of the Royal Society in 1947, his application citation stating that he was "Distinguished for investigations of chemical and physiochemical processes in living tissues, including a quantitative interpretation of the processes underlying potassium accumulation in isolated muscle, with applications to resting potentials and related questions; the exact determination of blood ammonia, the ammonia increase in shed blood, and studies of the deaminase involved; general structural relations of the mammalian kidney, and studies of diffusion rates through tissues; biochemical studies of yeast fermentation in relation to cationic exchanges and production of free hydrochloric acid; bio-geochemical study of oceanic evolution; new methods of micro-diffusion analysis".

In 1961 Conway became the first Irish scientist to become a Member of the Pontifical Academy of Sciences, nominated by Pope John XXIII.

In 1967 he was the recipient of the Royal Dublin Society's Boyle Medal. UCD's new Conway Institute of Biomolecular and Biomedical Research, which opened in August 2003, was named in his honour.
