= Henry O'Neill (illustrator) =

Irish artist and antiquarian (1798–1880)

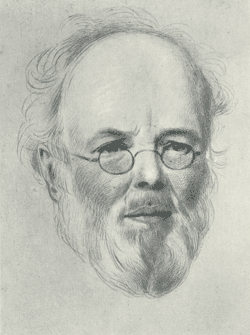
- self portrait held in the National Gallery of Ireland
- Born: 1798; Clonmel, County Tipperary or Dundalk, County Louth, Ireland
- Died: 21 December 1880 (aged 81–82); Dublin
- Occupations: artist and antiquarian

Henry O'Neill (1798–21 December 1880) was an Irish artist and antiquarian.

== Early life and education ==
Henry O'Neill in Clonmel, County Tipperary or Dundalk, County Louth, in 1798. His mother was possibly the daughter of Samuel Watson, a bookseller and publisher. Both his parents died when O'Neill was a child, and was raised by his paternal aunt, Sara O'Neill. She a haberdasher at 60 South Great George's Street, Dublin, who provided him a good education. From a young age, O'Neill demonstrated a talent for drawing, he enrolled as a pupil in the Dublin Society's Schools in 1815.

== Career ==
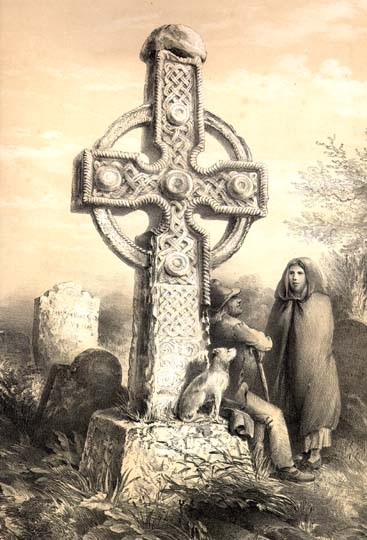
Illustration by Henry O'Neill; 1859 from Illustrations of Some of the Most Interesting Sculptured Crosses of Ancient Ireland

O'Neill was a diligent student, winning first premiums in every class he competed. As a pupil, he helped his aunt with designs for shawls and lace, and was employed by a print-seller on Dame Street, Allen. He worked in Dublin as a drawing teacher. He was presented with a silver medal "as a reward for his industry and talents" by the Dublin Society in 1825. He had a disagreement with his aunt over money, and was then supported by maternal relatives. By 1841, he was working briefly in the Library of Trinity College. From 1835 to 1879, he exhibited with the Royal Hibernian Academy. He was not offered membership of the Academy in 1843 when there was a vacancy, and resigned.

O'Neill was active politically, as a member of the Repeal Association, and some of his work depicted the imprisonment of Daniel O'Connell in Richmond Gaol and a series of lithograph portraits of the Young Irelanders, William Smith O'Brien and others. It is likely that Thomas Matthew Ray commissioned O'Neill to produce his watercolours of O'Connell's imprisonment.

Some of his drawings were published in the 1835 Picturesque Sketches of some of the finest Landscapes and Coast Scenery of Ireland by George Petrie and Andrew Nicholl and Fourteen Views in the county of Wicklow, from original drawings by Henry O'Neill and Andrew Nicholl by William Frederick Wakeman. Despite this, O'Neill struggled and moved to London in 1847 where he was unable to find work. He enlisted in the army, but was bought out by friends and returned to Dublin.

In 1855, he published his Descriptive Catalogue of Illustrations of the Fine Arts of Ancient Ireland, followed by Illustrations of the most interesting of the Sculptured Crosses of Ancient Ireland, Drawn to Scale and Lithographed by Henry O'Neill in 1857. In 1863 was published his Fine Arts of Ancient Ireland, illustrated with seven of his chromo-lithographs and wood-cuts by G. Hanlon in which asserted the pagan origin of round towers. His 1868 brochure, Ireland for the Irish, attacked landlordism. He planned a series on the round towers of Ireland, but only published one part in 1877, The Round Towers of Ireland, by Henry O'Neill. Part the First, containing descriptions of the four Round Towers in the county of Dublin. His last work was a lithograph of the Cross of Cong.

Most of O'Neill's works were watercolours, with occasional oils. His strongly held opinions led to his estrangement from friends and conflicts with learned societies, and his health suffered later in life due to the difficult financial circumstances he found himself in. In 1878, a committee was formed to help O'Neill and his family, with members including Lord Talbot de Malahide, Sir Arthur Guinness, and Sir Robert Kane.

== Death and legacy ==
O'Neill died in poverty on 21 December 1880 at 109 Gardiner Street. He was buried in an unmarked grave in Glasnevin Cemetery. He had a widow, Juliet (née Thierry) who was likely his second wife, a daughter and three sons. After his death, some of his family moved back to London. One of his sons was named Tyrone.

In 2016 a group of well-wishers came together to mark his grave with a Celtic cross. A viewing and reception to dedicate the monument was held on Tuesday 2 August 2016.

== Selected works ==
- Oil portrait of John Cornelius O'Callaghan (1874) held in the National Gallery of Ireland
- The Return of O'Rourke (1846), later owned by Daniel O'Connell
- A drawing of Bartholomew Lloyd as Provost of Trinity College, later engraved in mezzotint by C. Turner in 1838
- Pencil portrait of Zozimus from the John Joly collection in the National Library of Ireland
