= John Semple (architect) =

Irish architect (1801–1882)

- Born: 1801; Dublin, Ireland
- Died: 15 October 1882 (aged 80–81); Dublin
- Occupation: architect
- Known for: Church of Ireland churches

John Semple, also known as John Semple junior, (1801–1882) was an Irish architect who worked for the Board of First Fruits and designed such churches as Monkstown Church, Dublin and St. Marys Chapel of Ease, Dublin. He is noted for being ahead of his time in his style of architecture.

== Family ==
He was the eldest son of architect and engineer, John Semple senior (1763–1840), and Mary Russell. He was born in 1800 or 1801. He was the grandson of John Semple (died 1784) as well as the grand-nephew of George Semple. Other relatives included the stuccodors Patrick and Edward (fl. 1760) and carpenter and treasurer of Dublin freemasons, William (died 1813).

Semple married Harriet Cuppaidge in 1832, and the couple had at least 8 children. He died at his son, John George's house, on 15 October 1882, following a fall.

== Career ==
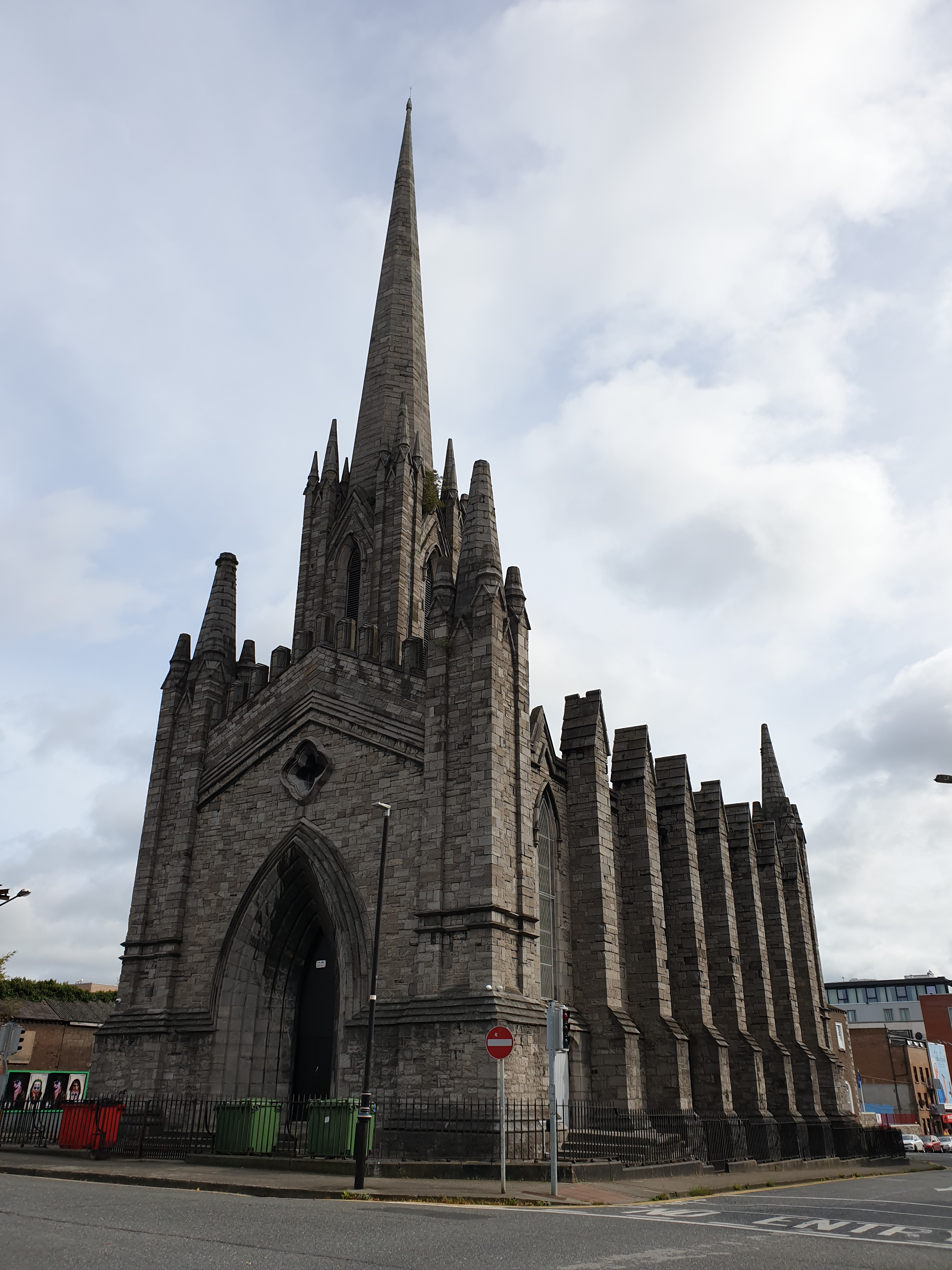
St. Marys Chapel of Ease, Dublin (1830)

His father worked for the Board of First Fruits and it is believed that he received his training from his father and in 1823-4 was taken into partnership with his father to the board under the auspices of the treasurer, William Magee. Until Magee's death in 1831, the Semples produced at least 25 churches. Although their work is attributed to "Semple & Son", the "more idiosyncratic series of churches" dating from 1825 and 1831 are believed to be Semple junior's work. They lost their appointment to the Board of First Fruits to Frederick Darley. After the deaths of his father and Magee, the quality of Semple's work declined.

Semple then became engineer to the Pipe Water Establishment until he was dismissed in 1842. He designed Carysfort Royal School at Macreddin and made additions to Carlow and Wexford jails. He was declared bankrupt in 1849, and lost his Regency villas at Seaview Terrace and Belgrave Square. After this, he lived with his brother, James, a barrister until James' death in 1869. He moved in with his eldest son, John George (died 1900) at 6 Ontario Terrace, Rathmines in 1876.

== Selection of Works ==
- St. Mary's Church, Donnybrook (1827)
- St. Maelruain's Church, Tallaght (1829)
- Monkstown Church, Dublin (1830)
- St Mary's, Dublin (chapel of ease) (1830)
- Seaview Terrace Donnybrook
- Selskar Abbey, Wexford
