= St Mary's, Dublin (chapel of ease) =

Former church in Ireland

Coordinates: 53.354726°N 6.268267°W

St. Marys Chapel of Ease
- St. Marys Chapel of Ease, Dublin
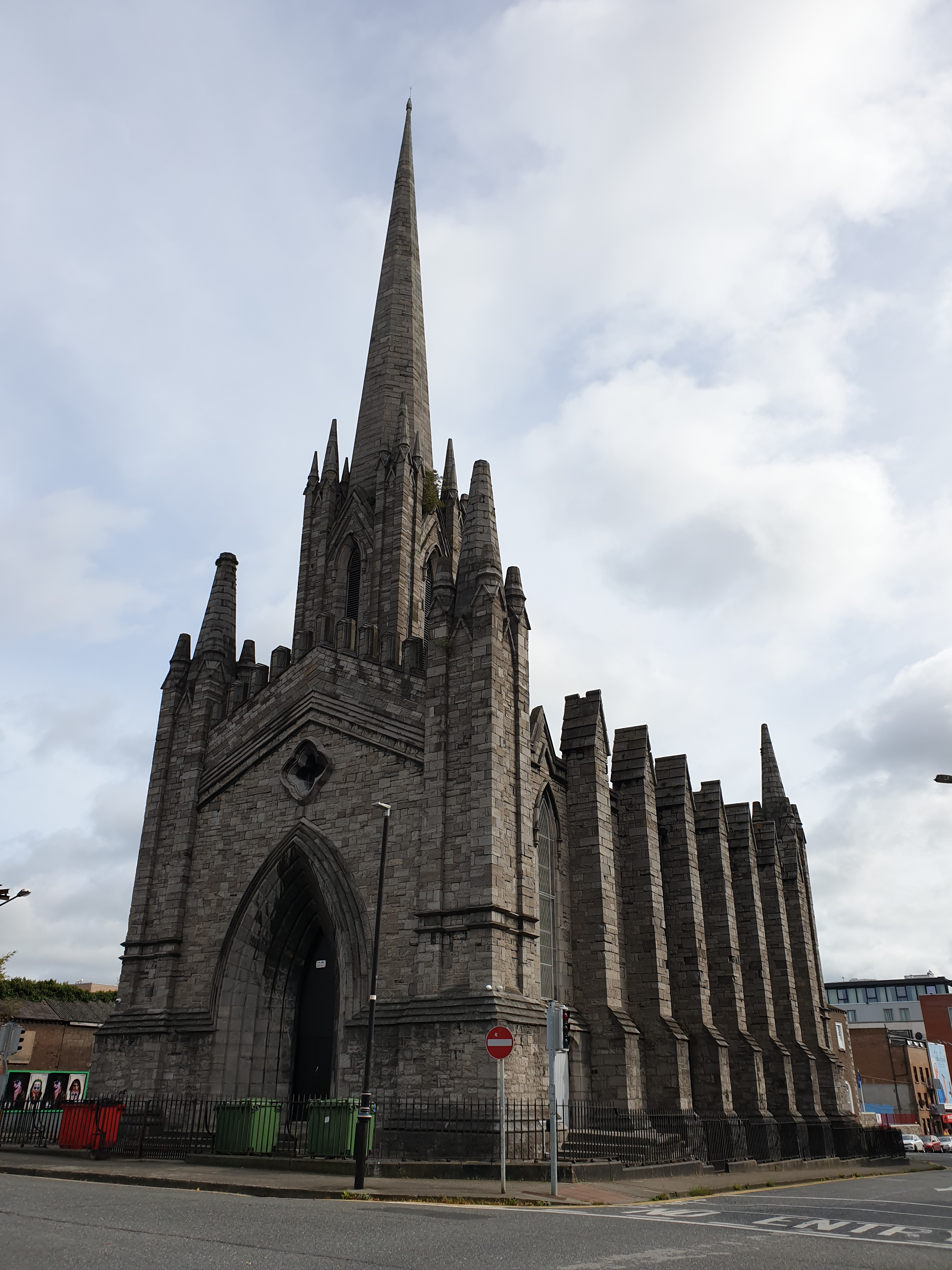
- The church in 2019

- Location within Central Dublin
- Location: St. Mary's Place; Dublin
- Country: Ireland
- Denomination: Church of Ireland

History
- Founded: 1830
- Consecrated: 1830

Architecture
- Architect: John Semple
- Architectural type: Church
- Style: Gothic Revival
- Closed: 1962

Specifications
- Capacity: 1000

St Mary's Chapel of Ease, also known as "The Black Church", is a former chapel of ease in Dublin, Ireland. Now deconsecrated, it was a church of the Church of Ireland located on St Mary's Place, Broadstone, Dublin. It is constructed from local calp limestone which takes on a dark hue when wet. This is the origin of the building's nickname. A chapel of ease is a church building, other than a parish church, that is located within the bounds of a parish for the convenience of those who cannot conveniently reach the main church. The parish's main church, now also deconsecrated, was St Mary's on Mary Street.

== History ==
The ground for the church was donated by the Viscount Mountjoy. The church was built in 1830 following designs by John Semple of the Board of First Fruits. He was given many contracts by patron Archbishop McGee, during an intense building period when the Church of Ireland and the Roman Catholic Church vied for control of the population.

One of the striking features of the church is the construction of the interior. There are no interior walls but instead the exterior walls are arched towards the ceiling to create a large parabolic vault. It was the culmination of a series of designs which Semple constructed around Dublin and countrywide over a 12-year period. The yearly progression of Semple's work is reflected in the refinement of his designs. For example, what began as a simple cross type motif over the main door, eventually became the fully expanded Semple 'Rose' window. The main door-way itself became one of his 'trademark' features: a tall, ovoidal gothic multi-leaved entrance.

The church was deconsecrated in 1962. After extensive modern refurbishment, the building is now used for offices.

The church was a few minutes walk from the Episcopal chapel of the Rotunda (Lying-in) Hospital and even closer to the Bethesda Episcopal chapel.

== Legend ==
Local lore says that one can summon the Devil if they run around the church 3 times.

== Literary references ==
The Black Church is mentioned briefly in the novel Ulysses by Irish author James Joyce, in the chapter entitled 'Circe', as the location of one of Bloom's many sins: He went through a form of clandestine marriage with at least one woman in the shadow of the Black Church. Joyce lived for a few months in 1909-1910 only yards from the Church in Broadstone, at 44 Fontenoy Street, one of the Joyce family's many temporary homes around Dublin. He stayed there with his son Giorgio from July to September 1909 and again alone from October 1909 to June 1910 while trying to set up the first cinema in Dublin.

It was the favourite church of English poet Sir John Betjeman and the Dubliner Austin Clarke. Clarke mentions the local legend of ‘Old Nick’ appearing in his 1962 autobiography titled Twice Round the Black Church.

== Gallery ==
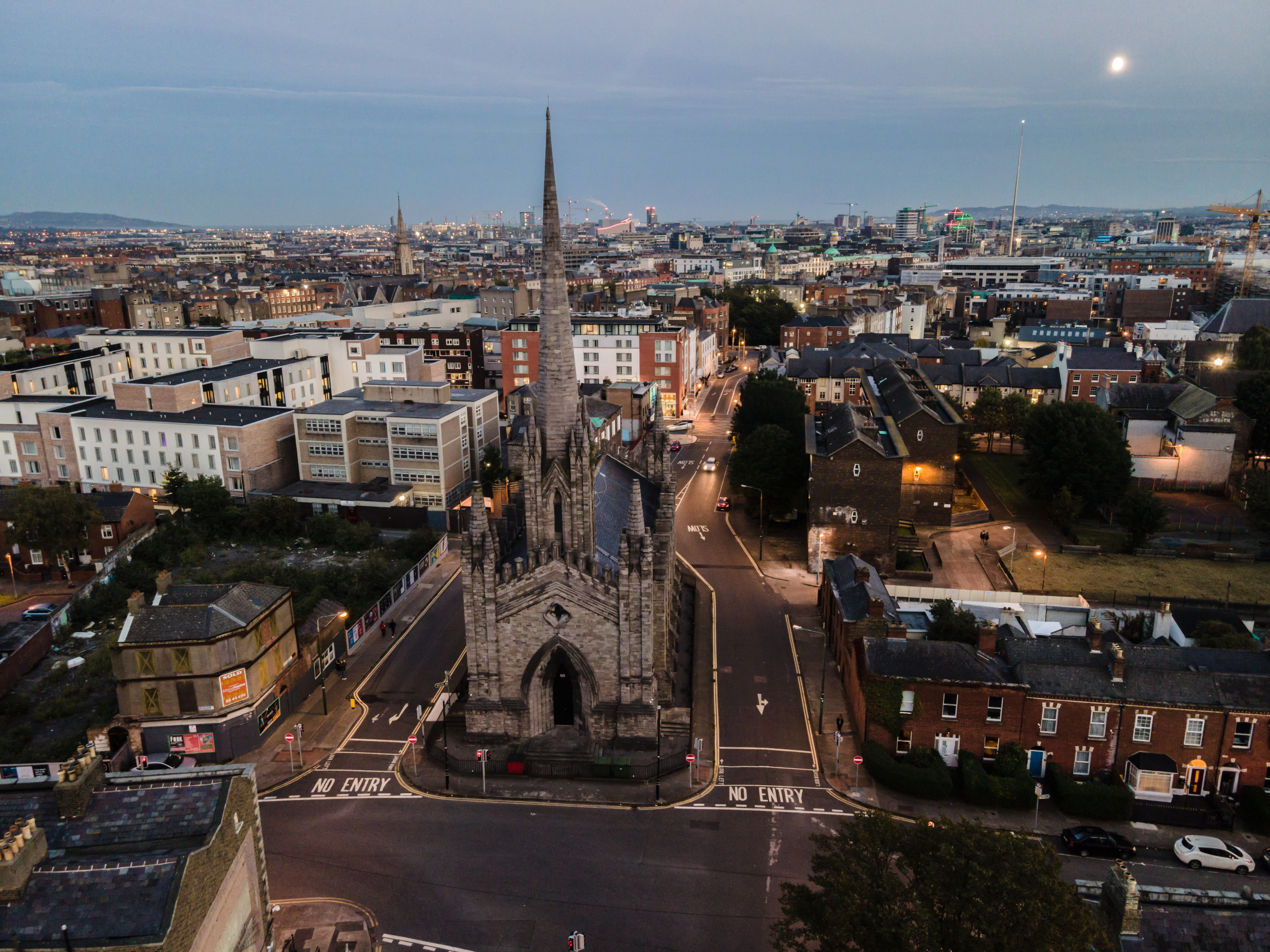
Church within its wider streetscape

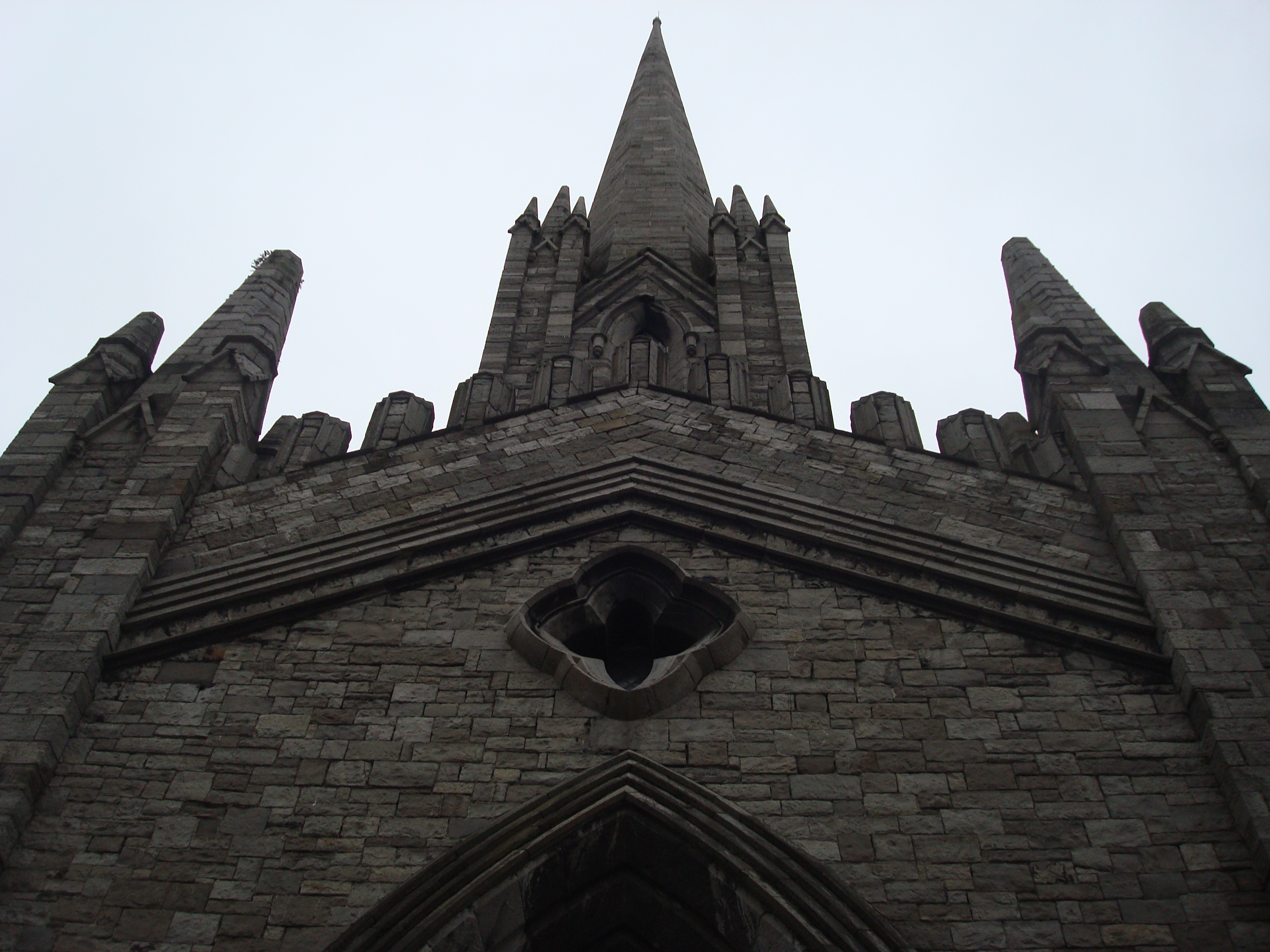
View of the steeple from the main door

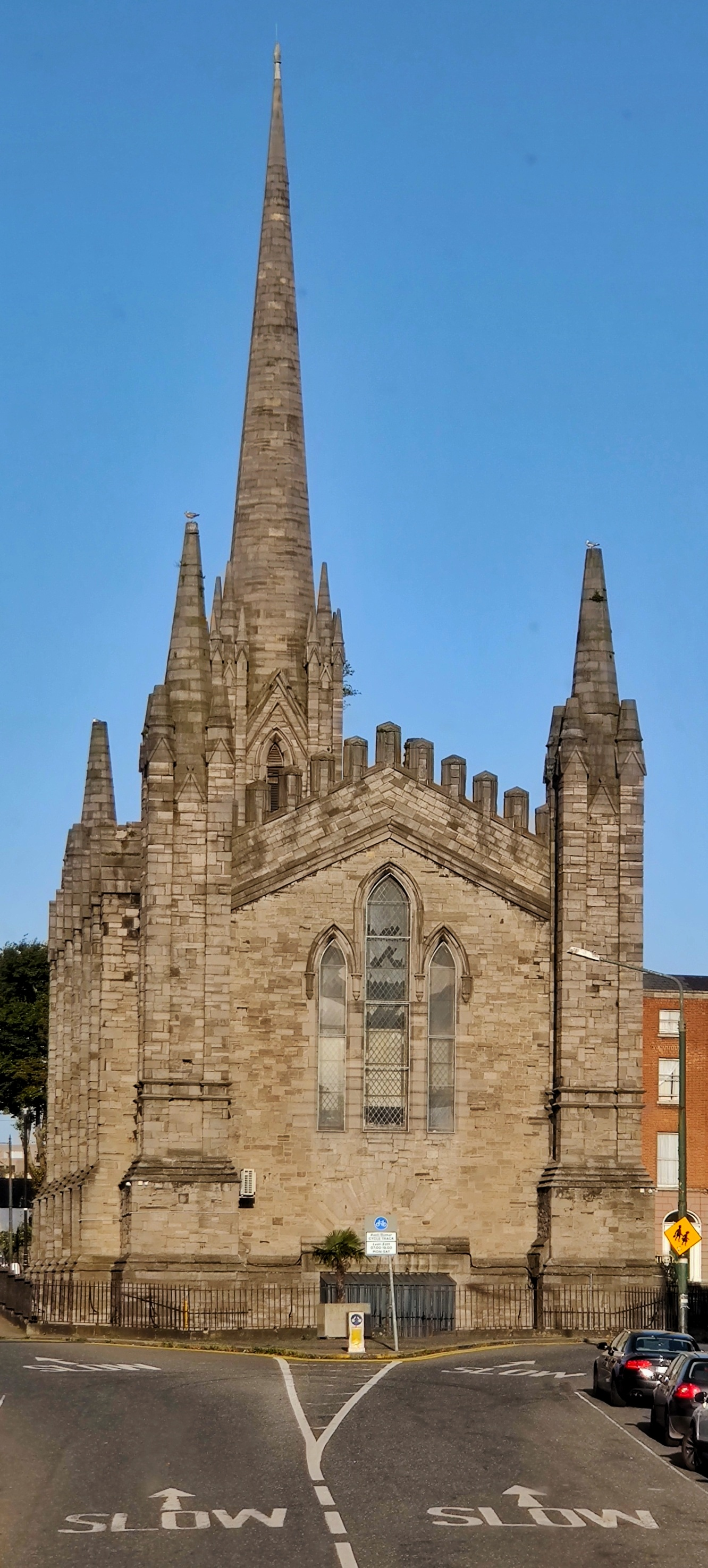
A South view of the church from Upper Dorset Street

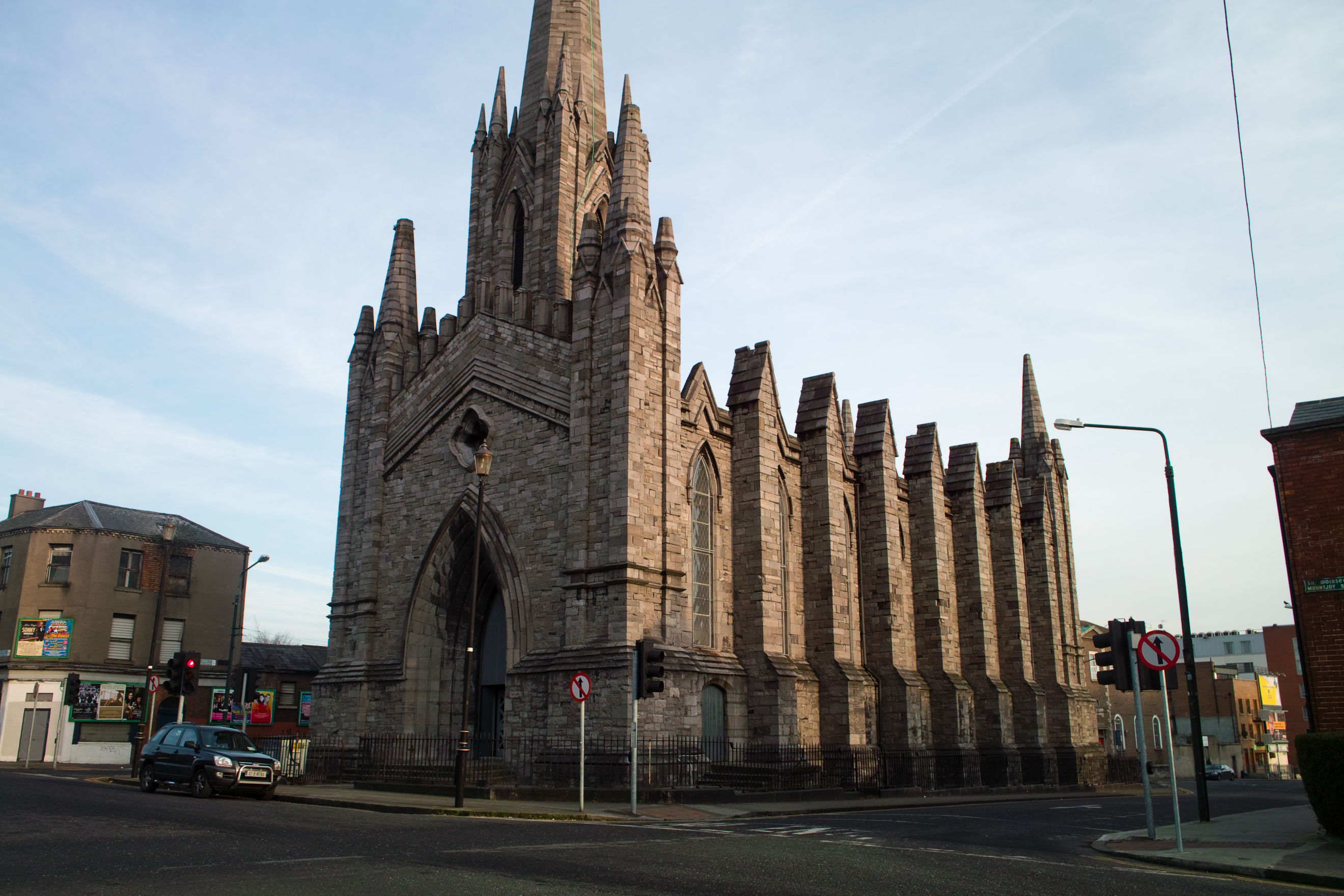
A side view of the church
