= Philip Smith (VC) =

Recipient of the Victoria Cross

- Born: c. 1829; Lurgan, County Armagh
- Died: 16 January 1906; Dublin
- Burial place: Glasnevin Cemetery, Dublin
- Military career
- Allegiance: United Kingdom
- Branch: British Army
- Rank: Lance Sergeant
- Units: 17th Regiment of Foot
- Conflicts: Crimean War
- Awards: Victoria Cross; Médaille militaire (France)

Philip Smith VC (1829 – 16 January 1906) was an Irish recipient of the Victoria Cross, the highest and most prestigious award for gallantry in the face of the enemy that can be awarded to British and Commonwealth forces.

== Details ==
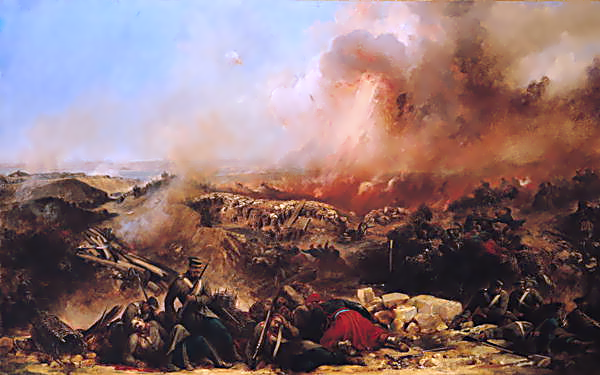
Depiction of The Battle of Sebastopol

He was 26 years old, and a corporal in the 17th Regiment (later the Leicestershire Regiment), British Army during the Siege of Sevastopol in the Crimean War when the following deed took place for which he was awarded the VC.

For repeatedly going out in the front of the advanced trenches against the Great Redan, on the 18th June, 1855, under a very heavy fire, after the column had retired from the assault, and bringing in wounded comrades.

== Further information ==
Having achieved the rank of lance sergeant, he was later reduced to the ranks and when discharged he was a private. He died at Harolds Cross, Dublin on 16 January 1906 and was buried at Glasnevin Cemetery, Dublin.

== The medal ==
His Victoria Cross is displayed at the Museum of the Royal Leicestershire Regiment now housed in the Newarke Houses Museum, Leicester, England.
