= Ethna Gaffney =

Irish professor and scientist (1920–2011)

Prof. Ethna Gaffney
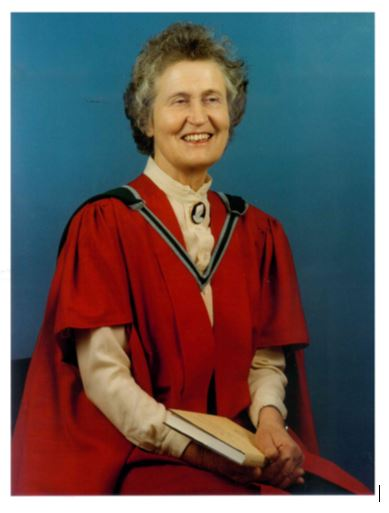
- Born: Ethna Elizabeth O’Malley; 6 May 1920; Galway
- Died: 29 September 2011 (aged 91); Dublin
- Education: University College Galway, University College Dublin
- Known for: First female professor at the Royal College of Surgeons in Ireland,

Ethna Elizabeth (née O’Malley) Gaffney (6 May 1920 – 29 September 2011) was an Irish professor and scientist. She was the first female professor at the Royal College of Surgeons in Ireland, holding the position for over twenty years from 1967–1987.

== Early life and education ==
Ethna Elizabeth O'Malley was born on 6 May 1920 in Galway to Christina (nee Ryan) and Michael O’Malley, a Professor of Surgery. Her siblings included Eoin (1919-2007), Sheila and Brian. A maternal aunt was Irish Nationalist and chemist Phyllis Ryan (Phyllis Bean Uí Cheallaigh), second wife of Seán T. O'Kelly, President of Ireland.

O'Malley was educated at the Dominican Convent, Galway and Loreto Abbey, Rathfarnham, in Co. Dublin. After taking a BSc (1940) at University College Galway, she moved to University College Dublin for postgraduate study in Biochemistry, where she worked under E. J. Conway.

She earned an MSc (1941) for work on elaborating micro-diffusion biochemical techniques for the determination of ammonia. She obtained a research scholarship from the Medical Research Council of Ireland to work between 1941 and 1944 on the development of a microdiffusion technique for the determination of blood glucose; her PhD (1945) was awarded for a thesis on the interchange of electrolytes across the yeast cell membrane during fermentation.

== Early career ==
In September 1944, on the inauguration of the Dietetics Course in St Mary's College of Domestic Science, Cathal Brugha Street, she was appointed to design and deliver the science programme, lecturing in Chemistry, Biochemistry, Bacteriology, Physiology and Nutrition in Health.

Subsequent to her marriage (August 1947) she resigned from this position in March 1948. Suddenly widowed in January 1952 following a plane crash, she was obliged to return to work. In September of that year she was awarded a 3-year Lasdon Research Fellowship in Bacteriology, where she worked with Vincent Barry, Director of the Medical Research Council of Ireland laboratories, Trinity College Dublin, on the chemotherapy of tuberculosis. In addition, she lectured on dietetics to 2nd-year Social Science students at Trinity.

Her official association with the Royal College of Surgeons in Ireland (RCSI) began in the academic year 1952–53, when she was appointed External Examiner in Chemistry and Physics to the College. In the spring of 1954, she lectured in Chemistry while Rae was on sick leave, and finally joined the staff as lecturer in Chemistry and Physics in September 1954. She was appointed first female Professor of Chemistry and Physics and Director of the Department of Chemistry and Physics in 1961 and remained at RCSI until her retirement in 1987.

== Career as a female academic ==
Gaffney's career is both typical and atypical of the professional profile of married women academics in mid- to late twentieth-century Ireland. Given the social and cultural pressures on wives not to work outside the home, there is frequently a hiatus when women left work to look after children. Once married, Ethna Gaffney resigned from her first lectureship. Suddenly widowed less than five years later, she managed successfully to combine childrearing with the world of work — a particularly male world. She was very proud of being the first woman to be promoted professor in Surgeons and used to recall formal dinners and honorary conferrings where she was the only woman present in a room full of men. This would not have intimidated her, as her older brother, Eoin O’Malley, was a surgeon, later to serve as President of the RCSI. In mid-twentieth-century Ireland, it was rare for a woman to have done a PhD, and still rarer a PhD in Science. Nothing in her early education had pointed Ethna O’Malley in the direction she took; she had not studied Science at school. She used to say that she opted for a BSc degree because the queue was the shortest at registration. Perhaps her family background played a role too: her father was Professor of Surgery in Galway and had three medical brothers; a maternal aunt Phyllis Ryan had done an MSc in Chemistry and was a public analyst.

Ethna proved to have aptitude. After a promising start to her career (NUI entrance scholarship, brilliant undergraduate results, a completed doctorate at the age of 24), her research output is heavily weighted to the early years. Accounts of her investigations for and with E. J. Conway and Vincent Barry appeared, some co-authored, in Nature magazine, in The Biochemical Journal, The Lancet and The Irish Journal of Medical Science. However, there is no record of further research publications. This discontinuity in research profile may have been typical of the age, and can be partly ascribed to the lack of incentives for full-time teaching academics to carry out research.

== Teaching ==
Ethna Gaffney's teaching commitments were confined to the pre-medical year. Perhaps even more pertinently, her particular domestic circumstances vitiated any research projects she might have entertained. Plunged into widowhood as a young mother of 31 with three children under the age of 3, she faced a heavy workload involving daily lectures and labs and meeting the needs of large classes of students from a wider range of cultures than would have been found in other Irish institutions of higher learning. Combining such pressures with lone parenting was not easy. For a number of personal and professional reasons, then, Ethna's teaching and administration duties were inevitably prioritised over research activities. These gender-related constraints and discontinuities, still relevant, are only now being fully recognised and addressed. Taken as a whole, her career trajectory also illustrates the way wives can often become involved, unseen, in behind-the-scenes work to assist their husbands.

In Ethna Gaffney's case, it was behind-the-scenes work that gave her link with the RCSI a valued continuity. She had been unofficially associated with the college, as a married woman, for several years before she sought full-time employment there as a widow. She told the tale of how she came to assist the RCSI external examiner in chemistry and physics, her husband, Jim Gaffney, who was a pathologist lecturing in Trinity. A couple of months before they were married, Alan O’Meara suggested to the engaged couple that Ethna could "work extramurally" for Jim. O’Meara, as RCSI's outgoing extern in chemistry and physics, wanted to propose Jim for this job. In his view, they would make an ideal husband and wife team: Jim was a fellow of the Royal College of Physicians, the essential qualification, but his wife would be able to correct the scripts in chemistry and physics at home, as well as coach him for the orals in Physics. Jim Gaffney was duly appointed as an external examiner at RCSI from 1948 until he was killed in a plane crash in January 1952.

The work was onerous (for Ethna), but (to quote her) "it paid very well, and Jim did enjoy attending the Charter Day dinners …". After Jim's death, O’Meara proposed her name as extern and, despite not being a fellow of the Royal College of Physicians, she was appointed. That association with the RCSI — both unofficial and official — was perhaps a key factor tipping the balance in favour of the RCSI when, in 1954, she was faced with a choice between returning to UCD's Biochemistry Department (as Conway was urging her to do) and taking up the offer of a lectureship at the RCSI.

== Personal life ==
Ethna Elizabeth O'Malley married Dr James C. (Jim) Gaffney in August 1947. The couple had four children, Patrick, Eoin, Michael and Phyllis. Their eldest son Patrick died in a drowning accident in October 1951 aged only three. Jim Gaffney was killed on 10 January 1952 in Snowdonia, in the first Aer Lingus plane crash. Ethna was pregnant at the time and gave birth to a premature daughter, Phyllis Gaffney, who was moved to Temple Street Children's Hospital in Dublin where she was the first incubator baby.

== Death and legacy ==
Ethna Gaffney died in Dublin on 29 September 2011. She was buried at Glasnevin Cemetery.

In 2017 the Royal College of Surgeons commissioned an oil painting of Gaffney from portrait artist Vera Klute.

In 2018, the Teaching laboratory in Royal College of Surgeons in Ireland was named after Ethna in honour of the service to the college and her dedication to teaching. The Ethna Gaffney Award is awarded by the RCIS to the student who achieves the best aggregate mark across all modules in their Foundation Year.
