= Raymond Jenkins =

Irish Anglican priest

Raymond Gordon Finney Jenkins (26 September 1898 – 16 January 1998) was an Irish Anglican priest: he was Archdeacon of Dublin from 1961 to 1974.

== Birth, education, and training ==
Jenkins was born in 1898, and following his school career entered the banking profession, with the Royal Bank of Ireland.

Following a lengthy banking career, Jenkins entered Trinity College, Dublin (TCD), as a mature student. He subsequently enrolled at the Divinity Hostel of the Church of Ireland (attached to TCD) and completed professional training for ordination. He was ordained as a deacon in 1930, and as a priest (aged 32) in 1931, followed by training curacies at two Dublin churches.

== Church career ==
Jenkins occupied a number of prominent roles in Church life in and around Dublin. Owing to the nature of his work, and of the Church community, many of these appointments overlapped, and there were many times when he held more than one appointment.

In 1935 he returned to his old college, occupying a number of roles including Dean of Residence, and Warden of the Divinity Hostel (1935 – 1949), and college Lecturer (1939 – 1970).

In 1939 he was appointed Rector (parish priest) of All Saints Church, Grangegorman, one of three leading churches of the Anglican Tractarian movement in Dublin. He served in this post for over thirty-five years, retiring in 1976. During the same period (1939 – 1976) he also served as Chaplain of St. Brendan's Hospital, Dublin, a psychiatric facility.

He also had a long and notable period on the staff of St Patrick's Cathedral, Dublin, the national cathedral of the Church of Ireland. He served as Canon Treasurer from 1952 to 1962, and then as Canon Chancellor from 1962 to 1976.

He was additionally appointed Archdeacon of Dublin by the Archbishop of Dublin, in 1961. He held this post until 1974.

== Retirement and death ==
Jenkins retired from all appointments in 1976 (at the age of 78). He died in 1998 (aged 99).
