= Thomas Matthew Ray =

Irish Nationalist, politician, activist and author

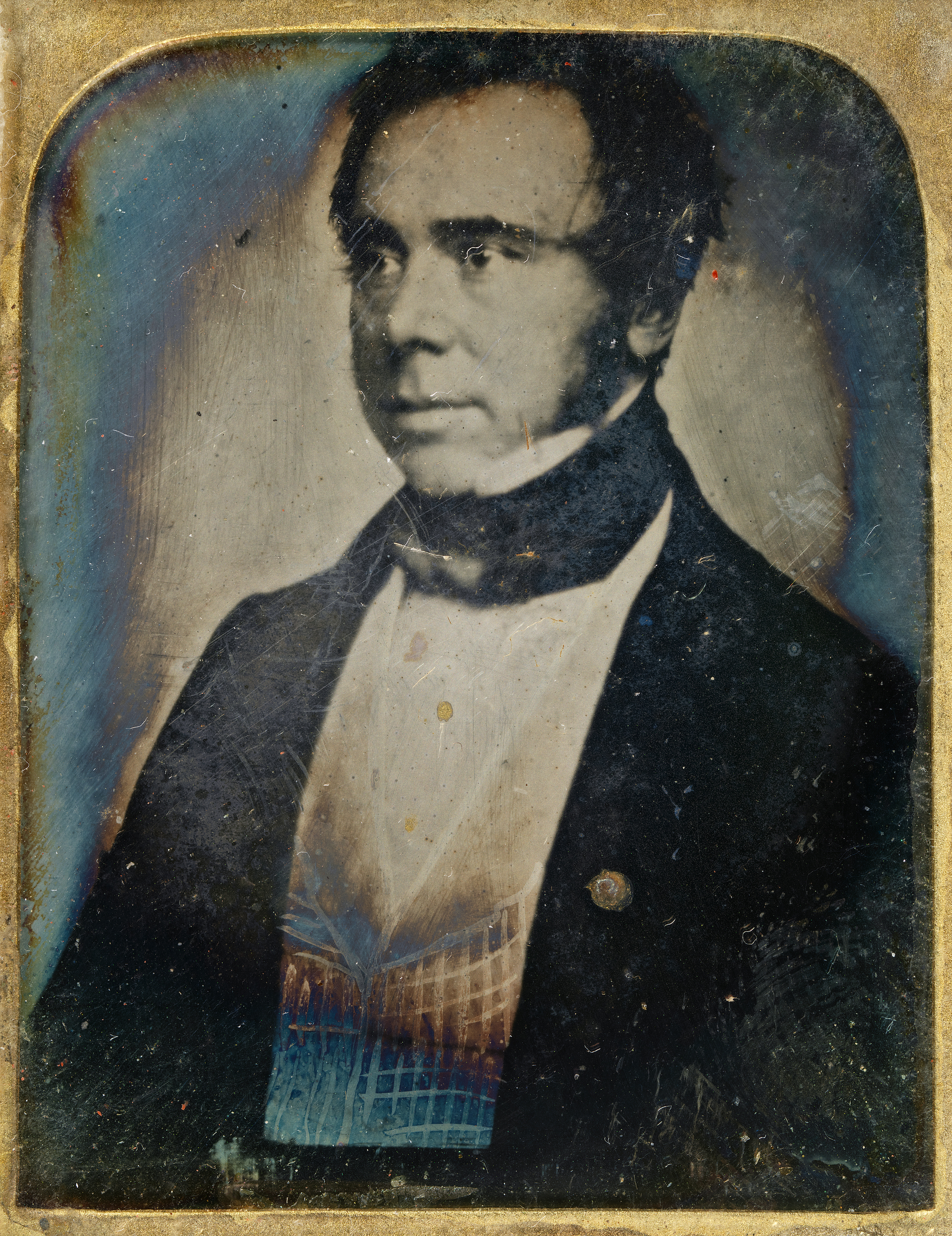
- Born: 1801; Dublin
- Died: 1881 (aged 80); Rathmines
- Other names: Irish Name: Tomás Maitiú Ó Riabhaigh
- Known for: Irish Nationalist, politician, activist and author

Thomas Matthew Ray (Irish: Tomás Maitiú Ó Riabhaigh) was an Irish Nationalist, politician, activist and author. Ray was born in Dublin in 1801. He was the son of Matthew Ray, who was also from Dublin.

Early in life, Ray was involved in the Nationalist movement in Ireland. He became the secretary of the Trades' Political Union in Dublin. It was here Ray attracted the attention of Daniel O'Connell, who appointed Ray as secretary of the Loyal National Repeal Association in about 1840.

While secretary of the Loyal National Repeal Association, Ray wrote letters for the association. In 1842, he organised the Repeal Reading Rooms, and established them in several towns, the first in Newcastle West, County Limerick.

In 1844, Ray was charged with exciting disaffection in Ireland and he, along with O'Connell and a number of others, was condemned to imprisonment. Months later, the decision was reversed on appeal to the House of Lords in Britain.

Upon the breaking up of the Repeal Association, Ray obtained the post of Assistant Registrar of Deeds in Ireland, and held that office for many years. He was the author of A List of the Constituency of the City of Dublin Elections, published in 1835.

Ray died at 5 Leinster Road, Rathmines, on 5 January 1881 in Dublin. He is buried in Glasnevin Cemetery.

== Sources ==
- A report of the proceedings on an indictment for a conspiracy in the case of the Queen v. Daniel O'Connell, John O'Connell, Thomas Steele, Charles Gavan Duffy, Rev. Thomas Tierney, Rev. Peter James Tyrrell, Richard Barrett, John Gray, and Thomas Matthew Ray, in Michaelmas term 1843, and Hilary term, 1844 by John Simpson Armstrong, and Edward Shirley Trevor 1844, Hodges and Smith, Dublin
- Historic Graves in Glasnevin Cemetery by Richard J. O'Duffy (pages 26–27); ISBN 1152294229, 9781152294226, 9781177577908
