= Belgrave Square, Dublin =

Residential location in Dublin, Ireland

Belgrave Square
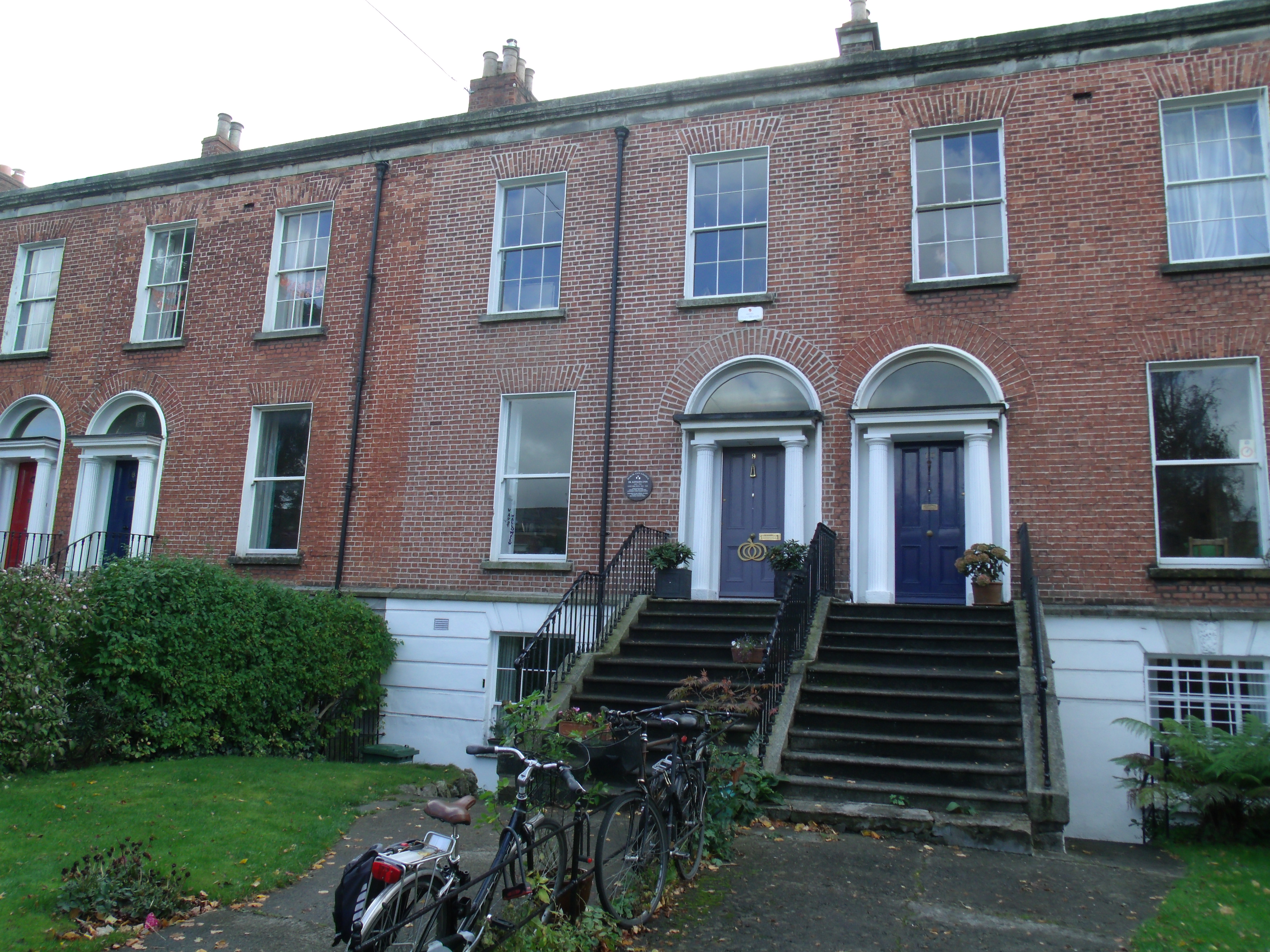
- typical Victorian houses in Belgrave Square

- Location within Dublin
- Type: Historic Square
- Location: Dublin, Ireland
- OSI/OSNI grid: O 15912 31722
- Coordinates: 53.322568°N 6.260475°W
- Area: 1 hectare (2.5 acres)
- Operator: Dublin City Council
- Designation: 1851

Belgrave Square is a residential Victorian square in D6, Dublin, located off of Castlewood Avenue between Rathmines and Ranelagh.

There is a small playground and old large chestnut trees, along with a rolling grassy area. Belgrave Square has hosted events, musical performances, and recreational outings.

== History ==
The area of the square was originally a wasteland known as Church Fields. The residential square was constructed in 1851.

By the 1890s the square had fallen into disrepair. The Governors of the Erasmus Smith School bought Belgrave Square from Mr John Holmes. It was used for 70 years as a sports ground for tennis, cricket, and rugby games by the students of the High School, Harcourt Street.

Work was done on a pavilion / caretaker's lodge in 1897 by John Good. The Governors rented the square for grazing sheep for £8 a year to keep grass cropped. The rent amount stayed unchanged until the end of this agreement in 1938.

In 1942, during World War II, the High School made Belgrave Square available to use an assembly center if it were necessary to put the government evacuation plan into action. Fortunately, evacuation was not necessary, although a water storage tank was constructed on the square by the Department of Defence. The water tank was dismantled within two years to restore sports area to the students.

The Sergeant's Pavilion was planned in 1952 to include dressing rooms, a kitchen, and a caretaker's residence.

In 1961, new school was built which moved the students to their sports grounds, so the High School no longer used the square for sports. The Diocesan School for Girls purchased the square. The students used the square for hockey, tennis, and netball.

In the early 1970s the Diocesan School for Girls merged with the High School, so did not need the square for sports any longer. The square remained private property and closed to the public, including to residents.

Residents called a public meeting on 8 October 1973 in the Rathmines and Rathgar Musical Society, which formed the Belgrave Residents Association. The square was posted for sale in 1975. The Dublin City Council acquired the square to develop into a local park on Sept 16, 1975, from the Dublin, Glendalough, and Kildare Diocesan Board of Education for £7500.

Paths were laid out, grass and shrubs planted, but the shrubs became too dense so were removed and converted to a rolling landscape with grass and trees.
