= Diocese of Tuam, Limerick and Killaloe =

Anglican diocese of the Church of Ireland

United Dioceses of Tuam, Limerick and Killaloe

Location
- Ecclesiastical province: Dublin and Cashel

Statistics
- Parishes: 25
- Churches: 89

Information
- Cathedral: St Mary's Cathedral, Tuam; St Mary's Cathedral, Limerick; Killaloe Cathedral; Clonfert Cathedral; Killala Cathedral

Current leadership
- Bishop: Michael Burrows, Bishop of Tuam, Limerick and Killaloe

Website
- https://tlk.ie/

The Diocese of Tuam, Limerick and Killaloe (full title The United Dioceses of Tuam, Killala, Achonry, Limerick, Ardfert, Aghadoe, Killaloe, Kilfenora, Clonfert, Kilmacduagh and Emly) is a diocese of the Church of Ireland that is located in the west of Ireland. The diocese was formed by a merger of the former Diocese of Tuam, Killala and Achonry and the former Diocese of Limerick and Killaloe between late 2021 and early 2022, after the retirement of the separate dioceses' bishops. Michael Burrows was appointed as bishop of the united diocese in early 2022. It is in the ecclesiastical province of Dublin. It is one of the eleven Church of Ireland dioceses that cover the whole of Ireland. The largest diocese by area in the Church of Ireland, it covers all of counties Clare, Galway, Kerry, Limerick and Mayo, plus parts of counties Cork, Sligo, Roscommon, Offaly, Laois and Tipperary.

== Overview and history ==
When the Church of England and the Roman Catholic Church broke communion, it was established by the state as the established church. Later, by decree of the Irish Parliament, the Church of Ireland became the independent State Church of the Kingdom of Ireland. It assumed possession of most Church property (and so retained a great repository of religious architecture and other items, though some were later destroyed). The substantial majority of the population remained faithful to Roman Catholicism, despite the political and economic advantages of membership in the state church. The English-speaking minority mostly adhered to the Church of Ireland or to Presbyterianism.

On 13 April 1834, the diocese of Killala and Achonry was united to the Archdiocese of Tuam. On the death of Archbishop Trench of Tuam in 1839, the Province of Tuam was united to the Province of Armagh and the see ceased to be an archbishopric and became a bishopric with Thomas Plunket becoming the first bishop of Tuam, Killala and Achonry. Meanwhile, in 1833, the two provinces of Dublin and Cashel were merged. Over the centuries, a number of dioceses were merged (see below), in view of declining membership. It is for this reason that the united diocese has five cathedrals.

In 2019, the Church of Ireland General Synod agreed to amalgamate the two dioceses upon the retirement of their incumbent bishops. These retirements took place in 2021, and in 2022, Burrows was elected as the first bishop of Tuam, Limerick and Killaloe. He finished his service in the Diocese of Cashel, Ferns and Ossory in April 2022 and was installed in the united diocese that same month. Despite being the largest single diocese in area, the two prior dioceses each saw the lowest average Sunday attendance of any Church of Ireland dioceses with just 612 in attendance in Tuam, Killala and Achonry and 1,205 in attendance in Limerick and Killaloe, according to the most recently available Church of Ireland census data. The united diocese's attendance of 1,817 makes it the second-least-attended diocese in the Church of Ireland after Meath and Kildare.

=== Predecessor dioceses ===
The present united diocese dates from 2022, the result of a number of mergers of sees beginning in the seventeenth century:

Ancient dioceses	Unions before 1976		1976	2022
Diocese of Ardfert & Aghadoe	1661: Diocese of Limerick, Ardfert and Aghadoe		Diocese of Limerick & Killaloe	Diocese of Tuam, Limerick and Killaloe
Diocese of Limerick	1661: Diocese of Limerick, Ardfert and Aghadoe		Diocese of Limerick & Killaloe	Diocese of Tuam, Limerick and Killaloe
Diocese of Clonfert	1602: Diocese of Clonfert & Kilmacduagh	1834: Diocese of Killaloe & Clonfert	Diocese of Limerick & Killaloe	Diocese of Tuam, Limerick and Killaloe
Diocese of Kilmacduagh	1602: Diocese of Clonfert & Kilmacduagh	1834: Diocese of Killaloe & Clonfert	Diocese of Limerick & Killaloe	Diocese of Tuam, Limerick and Killaloe
Diocese of Kilfenora	1752: Diocese of Killaloe & Kilfenora	1834: Diocese of Killaloe & Clonfert	Diocese of Limerick & Killaloe	Diocese of Tuam, Limerick and Killaloe
Diocese of Killaloe	1752: Diocese of Killaloe & Kilfenora	1834: Diocese of Killaloe & Clonfert	Diocese of Limerick & Killaloe	Diocese of Tuam, Limerick and Killaloe
Diocese of Emly	United to Cashel from 1569-1976		Diocese of Limerick & Killaloe	Diocese of Tuam, Limerick and Killaloe
Archdiocese of Tuam	1834: Diocese of Tuam, Killala and Achonry			Diocese of Tuam, Limerick and Killaloe
Diocese of Killala and Achonry	1834: Diocese of Tuam, Killala and Achonry			Diocese of Tuam, Limerick and Killaloe

== Cathedrals ==
- St. Mary's Cathedral, Tuam
- St. Patrick's Cathedral, Killala.
- St Mary's Cathedral, Limerick,
- St Flannan's Cathedral, Killaloe,
- St Brendan's Cathedral, Clonfert.

Five others are in ruins or no longer exist:

- St Brendan's Cathedral, Ardfert was destroyed by fire in 1641
- St Alibeus' Cathedral, Emly was demolished in 1877.
- Kilmacduagh cathedral, which is partly in ruins
- Aghadoe Cathedral, which is partly in ruins
- Kilfenora Cathedral, which is partly in ruins, dates from the 12th century.

St. Crumnathy's Cathedral, Achonry was deconsecrated in 1998 and is now used for ecumenical events.

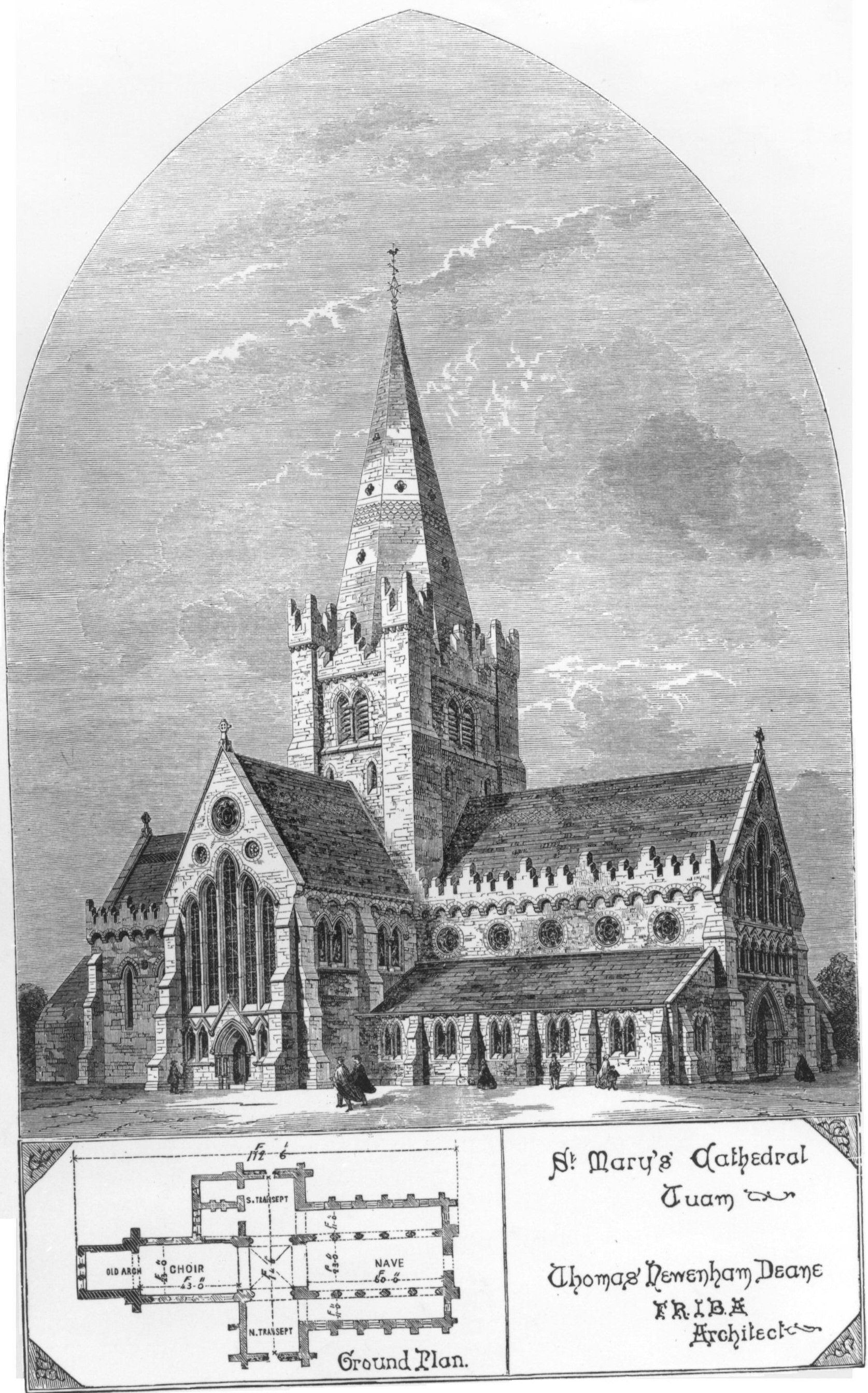
An engraving of St Mary's Cathedral, Tuam.

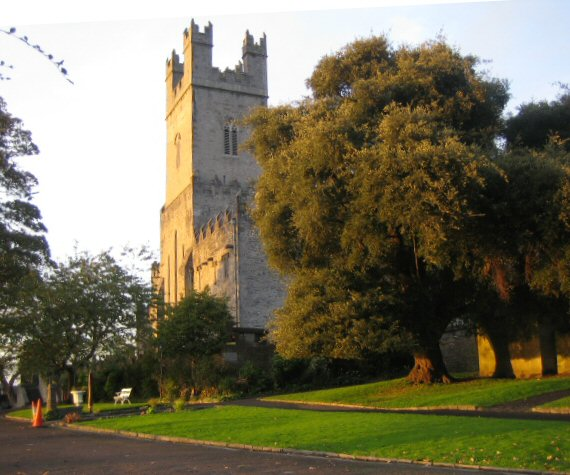
St Mary's Cathedral, Limerick

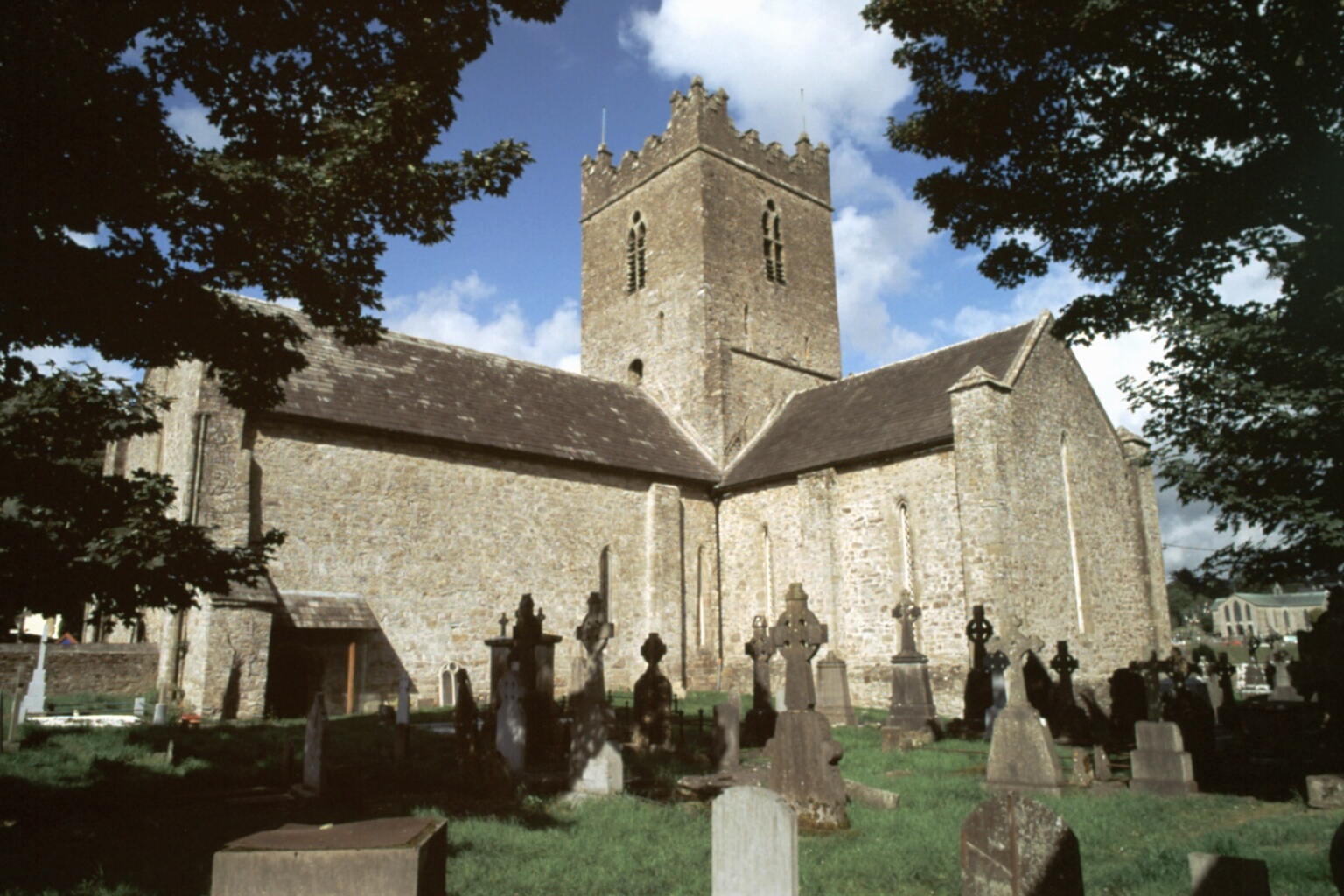
St Flannan's Cathedral, Killaloe

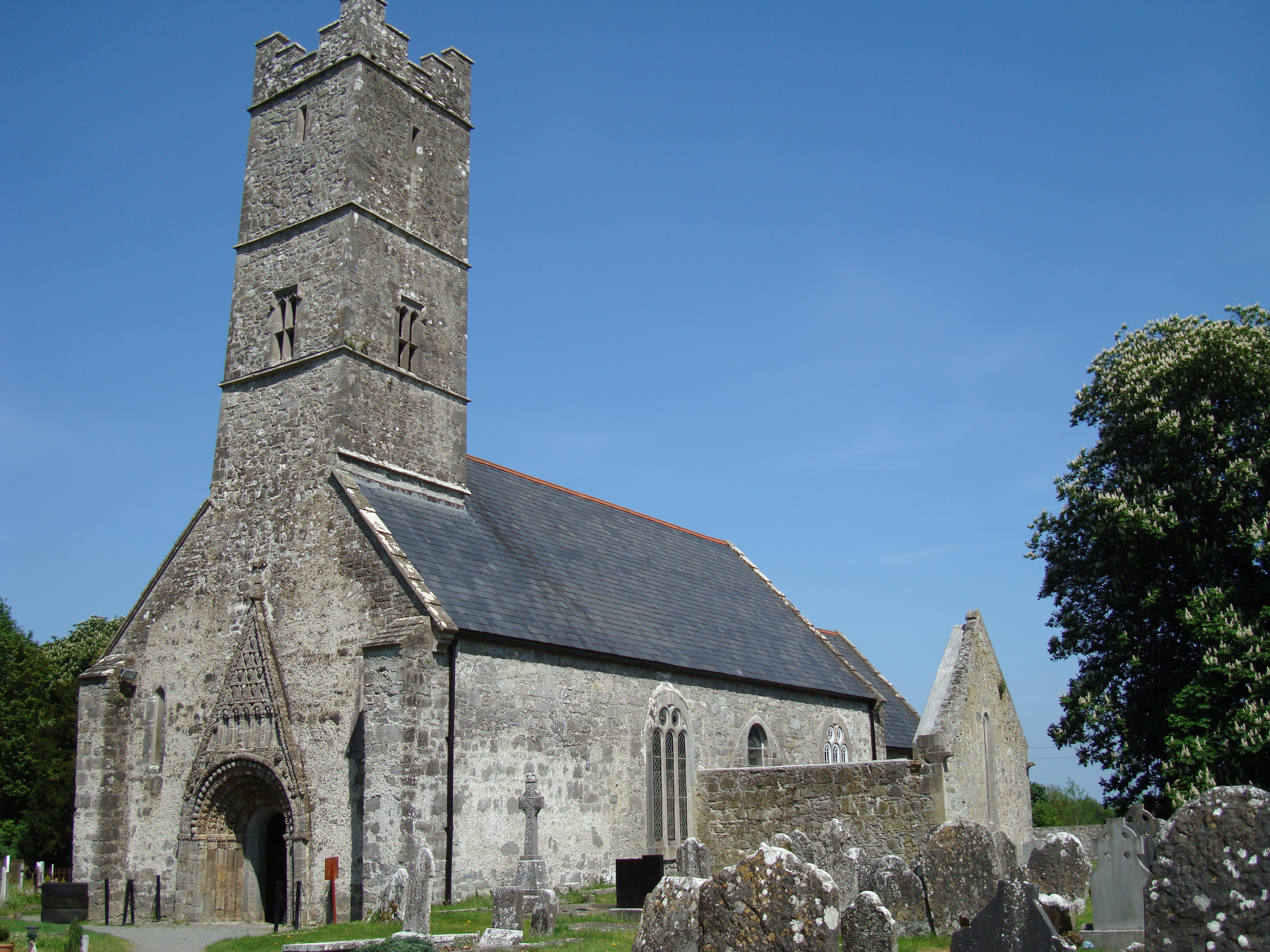
St Brendan's Cathedral, Clonfert

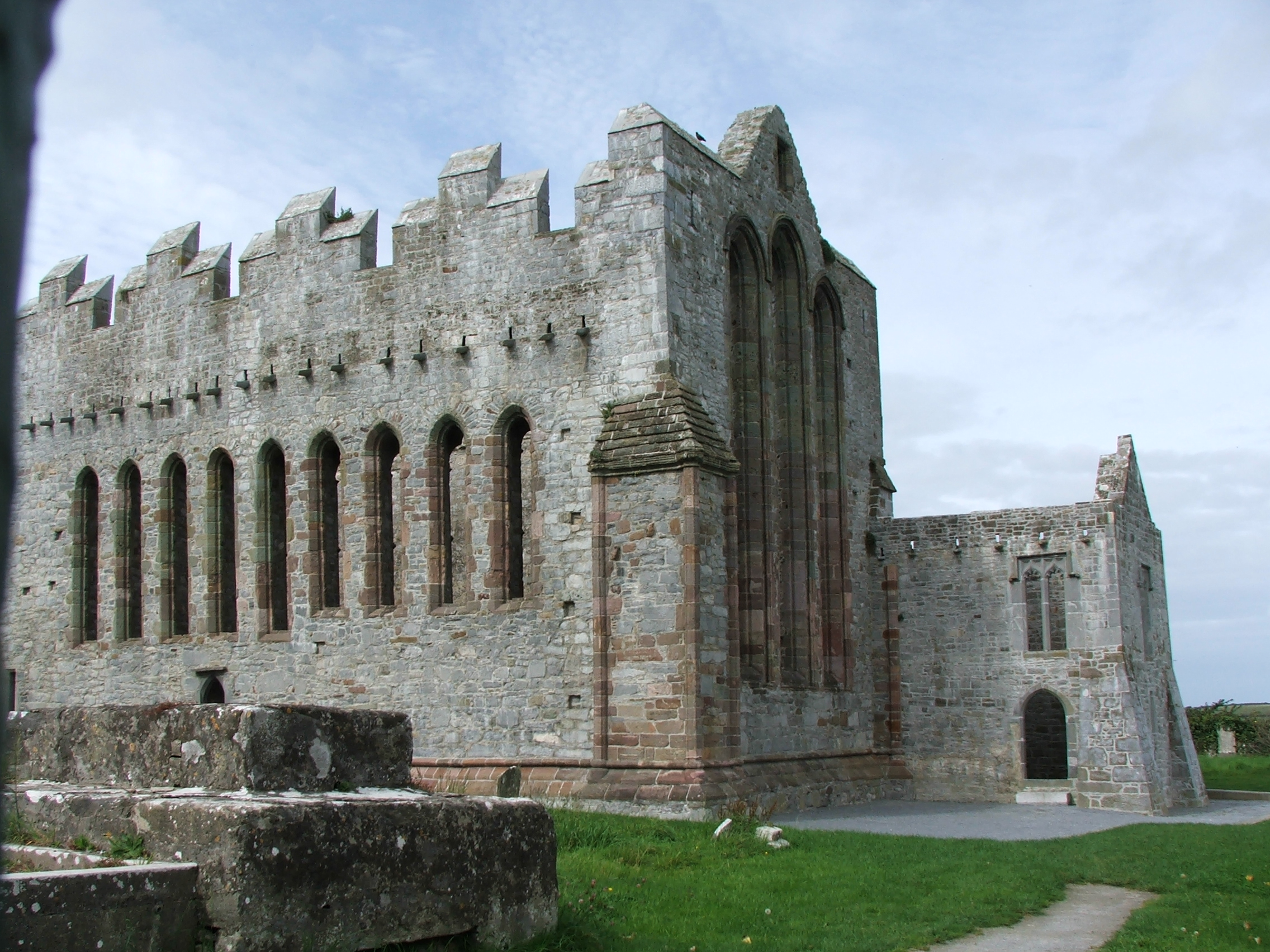
St. Brendan's Cathedral, Ardfert

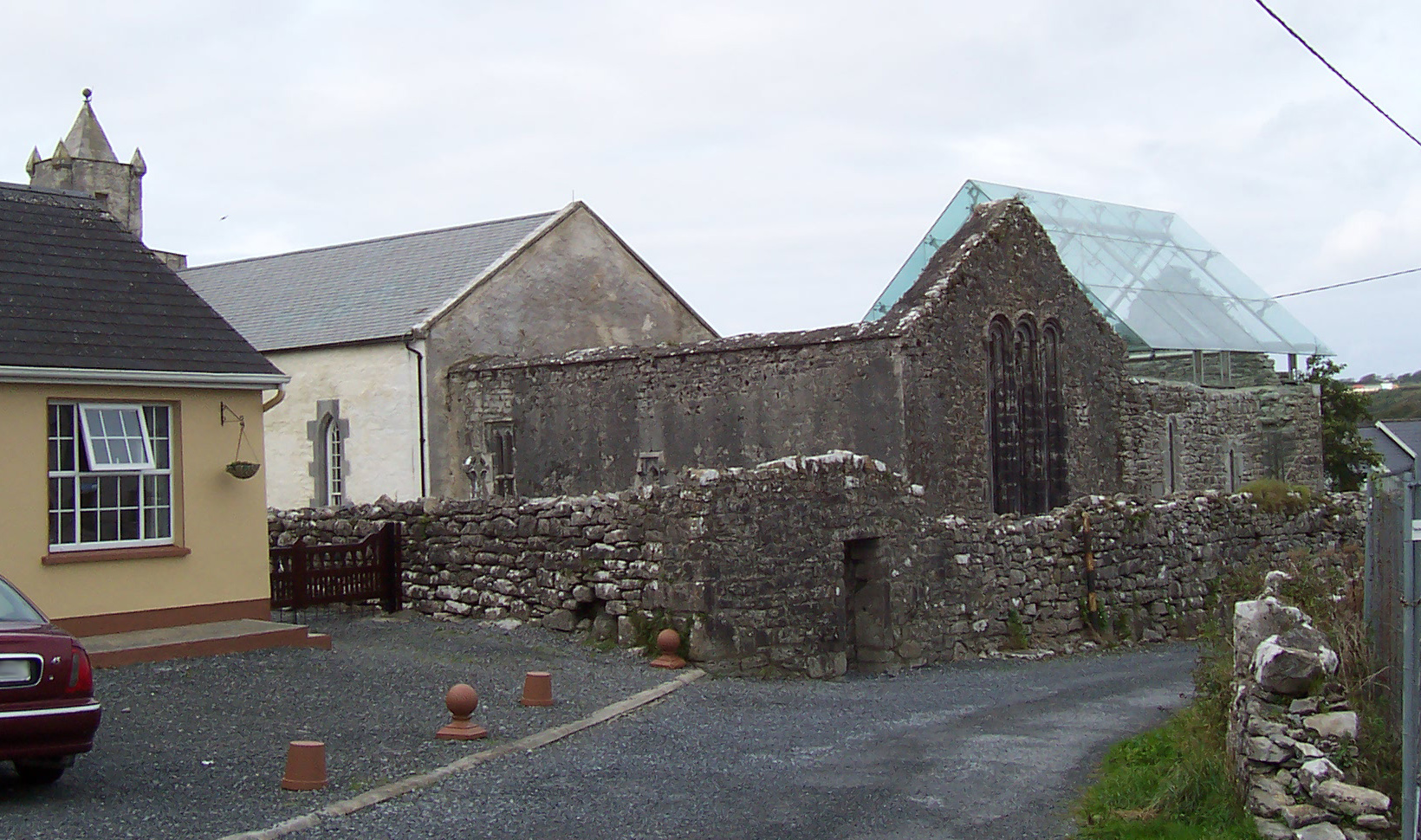
St. Fachnan's Cathedral, Kilfenora

== Parish groups ==
As of 2022, the united diocese is divided into a number of parishes, each led by a priest serving multiple churches.

- Achonry Parish: St George's Church, Tubbercurry • Rathbarron.
- Adare Parish: St Nicholas', Adare • Croom • St Peter & St Paul's, Kilmallock • St Beacon's, Kilpeacon.
- Aughaval (Westport) Parish: Christ Church, Castlebar • St. Thomas' Church, Dugort • Turlough Church • Holy Trinity Church, Westport.
- Aughrim Parish: St Catherine's, Ahascragh • Ardrahan • Holy Trinity, Aughrim • St John the Evangelist, Creagh • Woodlawn, Kilconell.
- Birr Parish: St Brendan's, Birr • Dorrha • Lockeen • St Ruadhan's, Lorrha.
- Clonfert Parish: St Brendan's Cathedral, Clonfert • St John the Baptist, Donanaughta • Christ Church, Lickmolassy • St Paul's, Rynagh.
- Cloughjordan Parish: Ballingarry • Borrisnafarney • Borrisokane • St Kieran's, Cloughjordan.
- Drumcliffe (Ennis) Parish: St Columba, Drumcliffe • Kilfarboy • St Fachan's, Kilfenora • St James', Kilfieragh • Kilnasoolagh.
- Galway Parish: St. Nicholas' Collegiate Church, Galway • Kilcummin Church, Oughterard.
- Kenmare Parish: St Patrick's, Kenmare • Church of the Transfiguration, Sneem • St. Michael and All Angels, Waterville • St. John the Baptist, Valentia
- Kilcolman (Killorglin) Parish: St Michael's, Killorglin • St Carthage's, Kiltallagh.
- Killala Parish: St. John's Church, Ballycastle • St. Mary's Church, Crossmolina • St. Patrick's Cathedral, Killala
- Killaloe Parish: Iniscaltra • St Flannan's Cathedral, Killaloe • St Senan's, Kiltinanlea • All Saints', Stradbally • St. Cronan's Church, Tuamgraney.
- Killarney Parish: St Mary, Killarney • Holy Trinity, Muckross.
- Kilmoremoy Parish: St. Michael's, Ballina • Straid Parish Church, Foxford • Killanley Church, Castleconnor • St. Anne's Easkey • Kilglass.
- Limerick City Parish: St Mary's Cathedral, Limerick • Sts John and Ailbe, Abington • St Michael's, Limerick.
- Nenagh Parish: Killodiernan • St Mary's, Nenagh • Templederry.
- Omey (Clifden) Parish: Christ Church, Clifden • Holy Trinity Church, Errislannan • St. Thomas' Church, Ballynakill • St. Mary's Church, Roundstone.
- Rathkeale and Kilnaughtin Parish: St Mary's, Askeaton • Castletown, Kilcornan • St Brendan's, Kilnaughtin • Holy Trinity, Rathkeale.
- Roscrea Parish: St Bruchin's, Bourne • Christ Church, Corbally • St Molua, Kyle • St Cronan's, Roscrea.
- Shinrone Parish: Aghancon • Dunkerrin • St Finnian's, Kinnitty • St Mary's, Shinrone.
- Skreen Parish: Christ Church, Dromard • St. Mary's Church, Kilmacshalgan • Skreen.
- Tralee Parish: Ballymacelligott • Ballyseedy • St James's, Dingle • Kilgobbin Camp • St. Brendan's, Killiney, Castlegregory • St John's, Tralee.
- Tuam Parishes: St. John the Baptist, Aasleagh • St. Mary's, Cong • St. Mary's Cathedral, Tuam.
- University: University of Limerick Chaplaincy

== Lists of bishops ==
=== Bishops of Tuam, Killala and Achonry ===
- The Hon. Thomas Plunket (1839–1866)
- The Hon. Charles Brodrick Bernard (1867–1890)
- James O'Sullivan (1890–1913)
- The Hon. Benjamin John Plunket (1913–1919)
- Arthur Edwin Ross (1920–1923)
- John Orr (192–1927)
- John Mason Harden (1928–1931)
- William Hardy Holmes (1932–1938)
- John Winthrop Crozier (1939–1957)
- Arthur Hamilton Butler (1958–1969)
- John Coote Duggan (1970–1985)
- John Robert Winder Neill (1986–1997)
- Richard Crosbie Aitken Henderson (1998–2011)
- Patrick William Rooke (2011–2021)

=== Bishops of Limerick and Killaloe ===
- Edwin Owen (1976–1981)
- Walton Newcombe Francis Empey (1981–1985)
- Edward Flewett Darling (1985–2000)
- Michael Hugh Gunton Mayes (2000–2008)
- Trevor Williams (2008–2014)
- Kenneth Kearon (2015–2021)

=== Bishops of Tuam, Limerick and Killaloe ===
- Michael Burrows (2022–present)

== See also ==
- List of Anglican dioceses in the United Kingdom and Ireland
- Archdiocese of Tuam (Church of Ireland)
- Dean of Tuam
- Archdeacon of Tuam
- Dean of Limerick and Ardfert
- Dean of Killaloe and Clonfert
- Roman Catholic Archdiocese of Tuam
