= Diocese of Tuam, Killala and Achonry =

Anglican diocese of the Church of Ireland

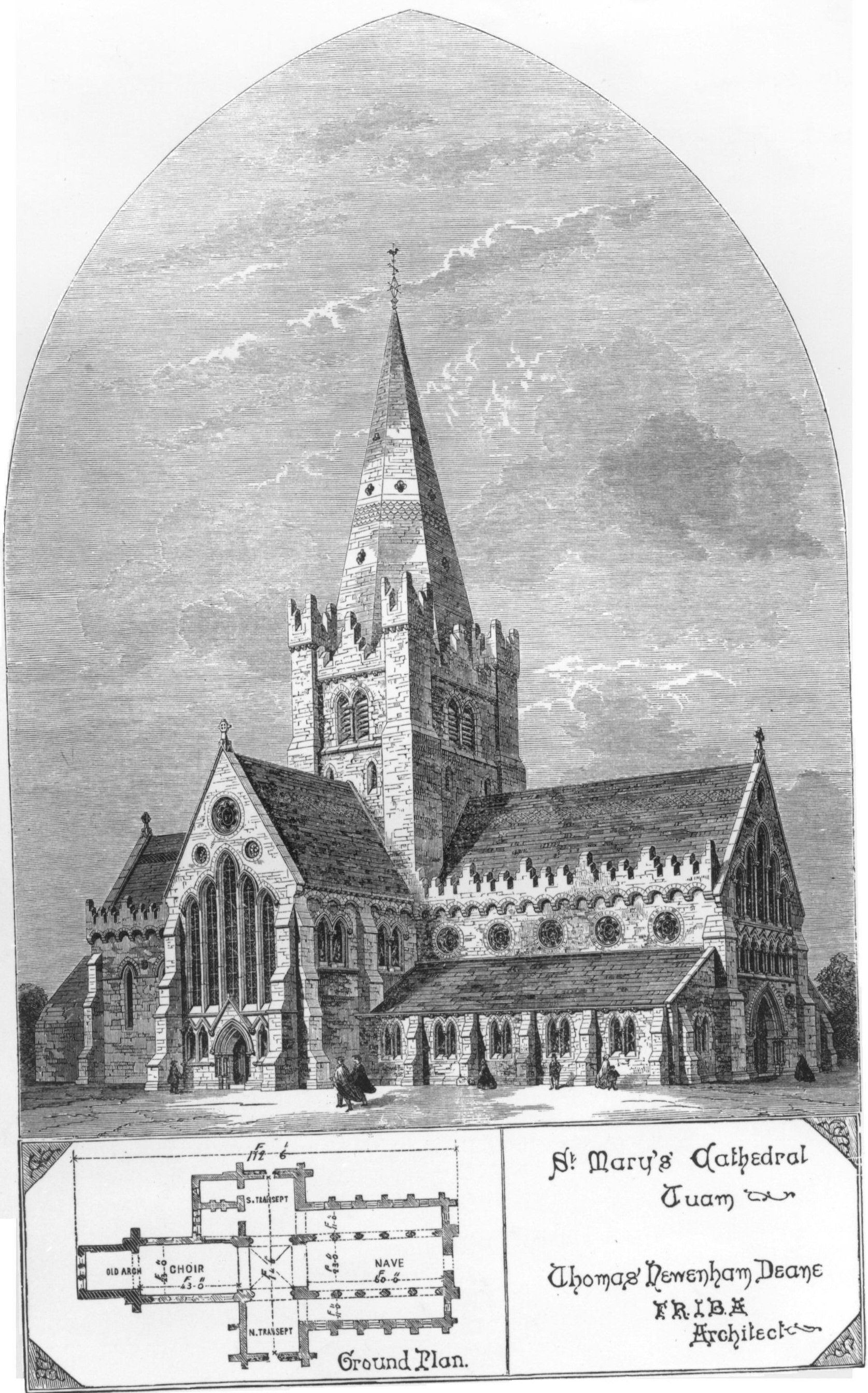
Engraving of St Mary's Cathedral, Tuam, as rebuilt in the 1870s and completed in 1878

The Diocese of Tuam, Killala and Achonry (also known as the United Dioceses of Tuam, Killala and Achonry) is a former diocese in the Church of Ireland located in Connacht; the western province of Ireland. It was in the ecclesiastical province of Armagh. Its geographical remit included County Mayo and part of counties Galway and Sligo. Between late 2021 and early 2022, the diocese was amalgamated into the Diocese of Tuam, Limerick and Killaloe.

== History ==
On 13 April 1834, the diocese of Killala and Achonry was united to the Archdiocese of Tuam. On the death of Archbishop Le Poer Trench of Tuam in 1839, the Province of Tuam was united to the Province of Armagh and the see ceased to be an archbishopric and became a bishopric with Thomas Plunket becoming the first bishop of Tuam, Killala and Achonry.

=== Coat of arms ===
Arms of the Bishops of Diocese of Tuam, Killala and Achonry

In November 2012, the Chief Herald of Ireland confirmed the following as the arms of the united diocese:

Azure beneath three Gothic arches as many figures or their hands faces and feet proper, in the middle the Blessed Virgin holding upon her left arm the Child their heads circled in glory on her dexter side a bishop pontifically vested his dexter hand raised in benediction the sinister hand holding a crozier bendwise and on her sinister an angel the head circled of the second the dexter arm elevated and beneath the sinister arm a lamb of the third impaled with Gules a pastoral staff or surmounted of an open book proper.

The two coats of arms recorded in the records of Ulster King of Arms for the dioceses of Tuam and Killala are impaled, or placed side to side, on the shield.

== Cathedrals ==
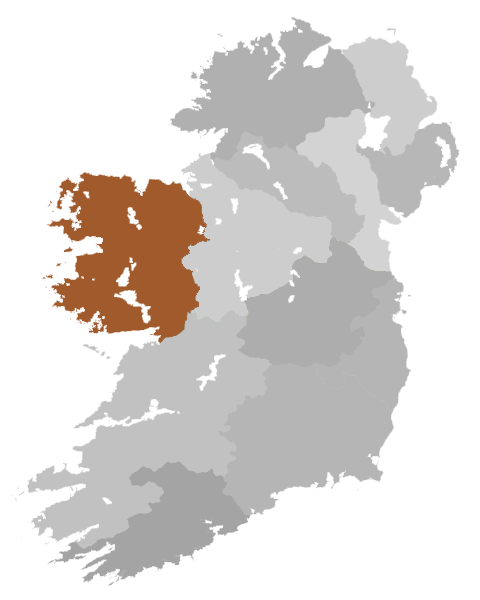
Diocese Highlighted

The bishop had two episcopal seats (Cathedra):

- St. Mary's Cathedral, Tuam
- St. Patrick's Cathedral, Killala.

St. Crumnathy's Cathedral, Achonry was deconsecrated in 1998 and is now used for ecumenical events.

== Parishes ==
Prior to its amalgamation, the diocese was divided into unions (or groups) of parishes.

Achonry Union:

- St. George's Church, Tubbercurry
- Rathbarron Church

Aughaval Group:

- Holy Trinity Church, Achill Sound
- Christ Church, Castlebar
- St. Thomas' Church, Dugort
- St. Thomas' Church, Knappagh
- Turlough Church
- Holy Trinity Church, Westport

Ballisodare Union:

- Holy Trinity Church, Ballisodare
- St. Paul's Church, Colloney
- Ballymote, Emlaghfad

Galway & Kilcummin:

- St. Nicholas' Collegiate Church, Galway
- Kilcummin Church, Oughterard

Killala Union:

- St. John's Church, Ballycastle
- St. Mary's Church, Crossmolina
- St. Patricks Cathedral, Killala

Kilmoremoy Union:

- St. Michael's, Ballina
- Killanley Church, Castleconnor
- St. Anne's Easkey
- Straid Church, Foxford
- Kilglass Church

Omey Union:

- Christ Church, Clifden
- Holy Trinity Church, Errislannan
- St. Thomas' Church, Moyard
- St. Mary's Church, Roundstone

Skreen Union:

- Christ Church, Dromard
- St. Mary's Church, Kilmacshalgan
- Skreen Church

Tuam Union:

- St. John the Baptist's Church, Aasleagh
- St. Mary's Church, Cong
- St. Mary's Cathedral, Tuam

== List of bishops ==
- Hon. Thomas Plunket (1839–1866)
- Hon. Charles Brodrick Bernard (1867–1890)
- James O'Sullivan (1890–1913)
- Hon. Benjamin John Plunket (1913–1919)
- Arthur Edwin Ross (1920–1923)
- John Orr (1923–1927)
- John Mason Harden (1928–1931)
- William Hardy Holmes (1932–1938)
- John Winthrop Crozier (1939–1957)
- Arthur Hamilton Butler (1958–1969)
- John Coote Duggan (1970–1985)
- John Robert Winder Neill (1986–1997)
- Richard Crosbie Aitken Henderson (1998–2011)
- Patrick William Rooke (2011–2021)

== Archdeacons ==
Reflecting a history of amalgamations within the diocese, the role of diocesan archdeacon changed over time. Stephen J. McWhirter was Archdeacon for Tuam, Killala and Achonry from 2017. In 2022 (coinciding with the diocese's amalgamation into the Diocese of Tuam, Limerick and Killaloe), McWhirter became incumbent of Rossorry Parish, Enniskillen.

== See also ==
- List of Anglican dioceses in the United Kingdom and Ireland
- Archdiocese of Tuam (Church of Ireland)
- Roman Catholic Archdiocese of Tuam
- Roman Catholic Diocese of Killala
- Roman Catholic Diocese of Achonry
- Dean of Tuam
