= List of archdeacons in the Church of Ireland =

Key
Active archdeacon	Male archdeacon
Inactive archdeacon	Female archdeacon
Position vacant &/or acting archdeacon	

The archdeacons in the Church of Ireland are senior Anglican clergy who serve under their dioceses' bishops, usually with responsibility for the area's church buildings and pastoral care for clergy.

== Archdeacons ==
#	Diocese	Archdeacon	Incumbent	Appointed
1	Armagh	The Archdeacon of Armagh	Peter Thompson	2023
2	Armagh	The Archdeacon of Ardboe	Elizabeth Cairns	2021
3	Down and Dromore	The Archdeacon of Down	Jim Cheshire	2023
4	Down and Dromore	The Archdeacon of Dromore	Mark Harvey	2023
5	Connor	The Archdeacon of Connor	Stephen McBride	2002
6	Connor	The Archdeacon of Dalriada	Paul Dundas	2018
7	Connor	The Archdeacon of Belfast	Barry Forde	2020
8	Derry and Raphoe	The Archdeacon of Derry	Robert Miller	2012
9	Derry and Raphoe	The Archdeacon of Raphoe	David Huss	2013
10	Clogher	The Archdeacon of Clogher	Paul Thompson	2023
11	Kilmore, Elphin and Ardagh	The Archdeacon of Kilmore	Ian Horner	2023
12	Kilmore, Elphin and Ardagh	The Archdeacon of Elphin	Patrick Bamber	2022
13	Kilmore, Elphin and Ardagh	The Archdeacon of Ardagh	Hazel Hicks	2022
14	Tuam, Limerick and Killaloe	The Archdeacon of Tuam and Killaloe	John Godfrey	2022
15	Tuam, Limerick and Killaloe	The Archdeacon of Limerick, Ardfert and Aghadoe	Simon Lumby	2016
16	Dublin and Glendalough	The Archdeacon of Dublin	David Pierpoint	2004
17	Dublin and Glendalough	The Archdeacon of Glendalough	Ross Styles	2024
18	Meath and Kildare	The Archdeacon of Meath and Kildare	Leslie Stevenson	2009
19	Cashel, Ferns and Ossory	The Archdeacon of Cashel, Waterford and Lismore; also Ferns	Alec Purser	2024
20	Cashel, Ferns and Ossory	The Archdeacon of Ossory and Leighlin	Mark Hayden	2023
21	Cork, Cloyne and Ross	The Archdeacon of Cork, Cloyne and Ross	Andrew Orr	2022
