= Bishop of Tuam, Killala and Achonry =

Arms of the Bishop of Tuam, Killala and Achonry

The Bishop of Tuam, Killala and Achonry was the Church of Ireland Ordinary of the former Diocese of Tuam, Killala and Achonry in the Province of Armagh. The last Bishop of Tuam, Killala and Achonry was the Right Reverend Patrick Rooke.

The bishop had two episcopal seats (Cathedra): St. Mary's Cathedral, Tuam and St Patrick's Cathedral, Killala. There had been a third, St. Crumnathy’s Cathedral, Achonry, but it was deconsecrated in 1998 and subsequently used for ecumenical events.

Following the retirement in January 2011 of the Right Reverend Richard Henderson, it was proposed that no successor be elected immediately, so as to give a committee time to consider the future of the diocese; this proposal was, however, defeated on 5 March 2011 at a special meeting of the Church of Ireland General Synod called to consider the suggestion. A successor, Patrick Rooke, was accordingly elected. Rooke, who was the last bishop of the Diocese of Tuam, Killala and Achonry, retired in October 2021. The diocese was subsequently amalgamated with the Diocese of Tuam, Limerick and Killaloe.

== List of bishops ==
Bishops of Tuam, Killala and Achonry
From	Until	Incumbent	Notes
1839	1866	Thomas Plunket	Nominated 5 April 1839; consecrated 14 April 1839; also became 2nd Baron Plunket in 1854; died 19 October 1866
1867	1890	Charles Bernard	Appointed by letters patent 30 November 1866; consecrated 30 January 1867; died 31 January 1890
1890	1913	James O'Sullivan	Elected 14 April 1890; consecrated 15 May 1890; resigned February 1913; died 10 January 1915
1913	1919	Benjamin Plunket	Elected 13 April 1913; consecrated 10 May 1913; translated to Meath 15 October 1919
1920	1923	Arthur Edwin Ross	Elected 15 January 1920; consecrated 24 February 1920; died 24 May 1924
1923	1927	John Orr	Elected 18 July 1923; consecrated 6 August 1923; translated to Meath 15 November 1927
1928	1931	John Harden	Elected 15 November 1927; consecrated 6 January 1928; died 2 October 1931
1932	1938	William Hardy Holmes	Elected 15 December 1931; consecrated 2 February 1932; translated to Meath 19 October 1938
1939	1957	John Crozier	Elected 23 November 1938; consecrated 2 February 1939; resigned 31 December 1957; died 1966
1958	1969	Arthur Butler	Elected 9 April 1958; consecrated 27 May 1958; translated to Connor 14 October 1969
1970	1985	John Duggan	Elected 27 November 1970; consecrated 2 February 1970; resigned 1985; died 20 July 2000
1986	1997	John Neill	Elected 6 January 1986; consecrated January 1986; translated to Cashel and Ossory 23 April 1997
1998	2011	Richard Henderson	Elected 21 November 1997; consecrated 2 February 1998. Resigned to return to parish ministry in the Church of England.
2011	2021	Patrick William Rooke	Elected by the House of Bishops 13 April 2011; consecrated 9 September 2011.

== See also ==
- Archbishop of Tuam
- Bishop of Killala and Achonry
- Bishop of Killala
- Bishop of Achonry
