= Sandford Park School =

Location
- Ranelagh; Ireland; 53.322202°N 6.25014°W

Information
- Type: Non-denominational
- Established: 1922
- Principal: Jim Murphy
- Gender: Co-ed
- Age: 12 to 18
- Enrollment: 429
- Colours: Green, Gold and Purple
- Website: sandfordparkschool.ie

Sandford Park School is a private, non-denominational, co-educational secondary school, located in Ranelagh, Dublin, Ireland. It was founded in 1922.

== History ==
The school was founded in 1922 by Alfred Le Peton, who served as its first headmaster. Le Peton had previously served as joint headmaster of Earlsfort House School alongside Ernest Exshaw. It was decided to move the school from the terraced city-centre property of Earlsfort House to the 2.5 hectare Ranelagh property of Sandford Park, originally designed in 1894 by Thomas Edmund Hudman for James P. Pile, a property developer and Hudman’s brother-in-law. The school was founded as non-denominational, to contrast with the majority of schools in Ireland at the time, which had religious patronages. In its first year of teaching, the school had enrolled fifty-three boys. Le Peton resigned as headmaster in 1925.

The Sandford Union, a past pupils union, was inaugurated in the 1930s.

In 2013, the school began accepting enrolment for girls in all year groups, and in 2021 there were 429 students attending in total, of whom 171 were girls.

== Notable past pupils ==
- Max Abrahamson, internationally renowned construction lawyer
- Jonathan Philbin Bowman, journalist
- Conor Cruise O'Brien, diplomat, Labour Party politician, writer and academic
- Justin Keating, politician and former Labour Party cabinet minister
- Graham Knuttel, painter and sculptor
- Ham Lambert, international cricketer, rugby player and rugby referee
- Charles Mellon, first-class cricketer
- John Neill, Church of Ireland Archbishop of Dublin 2002–2011
- Owen Sheehy-Skeffington, socialist and pacifist
- Patrick Rooke (born 1955), Bishop of Tuam, Killala, and Achonry
- Hugh Wallace architect and tv presenter
