= Michael Delaune =

Michael Delaune was an Anglican priest in the 17th century.

Delaune was born in London and educated at Trinity College, Dublin. He was Archdeacon of Dublin from 1672 until 1675.
