= John Crozier =

John Crozier may refer to:

- John Crozier (archbishop of Armagh) (1858–1920), Anglican bishop in Ireland, father of the below
- John Crozier (bishop of Tuam, Killala and Achonry) (1879–1966), Anglican bishop in Ireland, son of the above
- John Crozier (politician) (1814–1887) Australian pastoralist and member of South Australian Legislative Council
- John Hervey Crozier (1812–1889), American politician
