= Edwin Sikes =

Archdeacon of Ross, Ireland from 1926 to 1950

Edwin Sikes was Archdeacon of Ross, Ireland from 1926 until 1950.

He was educated at Trinity College, Dublin and ordained in 1900. After a curacy in Castlemagner he held incumbencies at Ardnageehy, Cork, Shandon and Abbeystrewry.
