= Trefusis Lovell =

Anglican priest

Trefusis Lovell (7 April 1767 – 10 October 1844) was an Anglican priest in the late 18th and early 19th centuries.

Lovell was born in Plymouth and educated at Exeter College, Oxford. He was Chaplain to Bishop Frederick Hervey from 1792 to 1796; Prebendary of Aghadowey in Derry Cathedral from 1796 to 1798; and Archdeacon of Derry from 1798 until 1813. He was then Rector of St Luke, Marylebone until his death.
