= Diocese of Emly =

The Diocese of Emly can refer to:

- The Roman Catholic diocese of Emly is incorporated into the Roman Catholic Archdiocese of Cashel and Emly
- The Church of Ireland diocese of Emly is incorporated into the United Dioceses of Tuam, Killala, Achonry, Limerick, Ardfert, Aghadoe, Killaloe, Kilfenora, Clonfert, Kilmacduagh and Emly

== See also ==
- The Bishop of Emly
- The Archbishop of Cashel and Emly
