= Diocese of Clonfert =

The Diocese of Clonfert may refer to:

- Diocese of Clonfert (Roman Catholic)
- The former Church of Ireland diocese of Clonfert is now incorporated within the united Diocese of Tuam, Limerick and Killaloe
