= William Plunket, 4th Baron Plunket =

Irish Anglican archbishop

The Most Reverend and Right Honourable The Lord Plunket
- Archbishop of Dublin; Bishop of Glendalough; Primate of Ireland
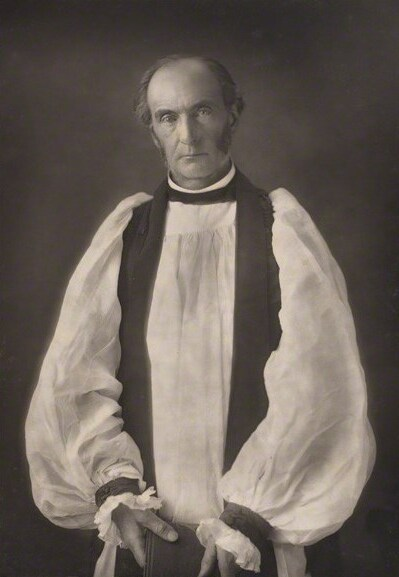
- Church: Church of Ireland
- Diocese: Dublin and Glendalough
- Elected: 18 December 1884
- In office: 1884-1897
- Predecessor: Richard Chenevix Trench
- Successor: Joseph Peacocke
- Previous post: Bishop of Meath (1876-1884)

Orders
- Consecration: 10 December 1876 by Marcus Beresford

Personal details
- Born: 26 August 1828 Dublin, Ireland
- Died: 1 April 1897 (aged 68) Dublin, Ireland
- Buried: Mount Jerome Cemetery
- Denomination: Anglican
- Spouse: Anne Lee Guinness
- Education: Cheltenham College; Trinity College, Dublin

William Conyngham Plunket, 4th Baron Plunket (26 August 1828 – 1 April 1897) was Dean of Christ Church Cathedral and Archbishop of Dublin in the Church of Ireland.

== Life ==
Born in Dublin, he was the eldest son of John Plunket, 3rd Baron Plunket and Charlotte Bushe. His elder sister Anna married John Darley, bishop of Kilmore, Elphin, and Ardagh.

Plunket was educated at Cheltenham College and Trinity College, Dublin (B.A. 1853; M.A. 1864) before being appointed chaplain and private secretary to his uncle, the Bishop of Tuam, in 1857, a post he held for seven years. The following year, he became Rector of Kilmoyan and Cummer in County Galway. In 1863, he married Anne Lee Guinness, daughter of Sir Benjamin Lee Guinness. Their son William was to have a successful career in government administration. Another son, Benjamin, served as Bishop of Meath and he was the father of Olive, Countess Fitzwilliam.

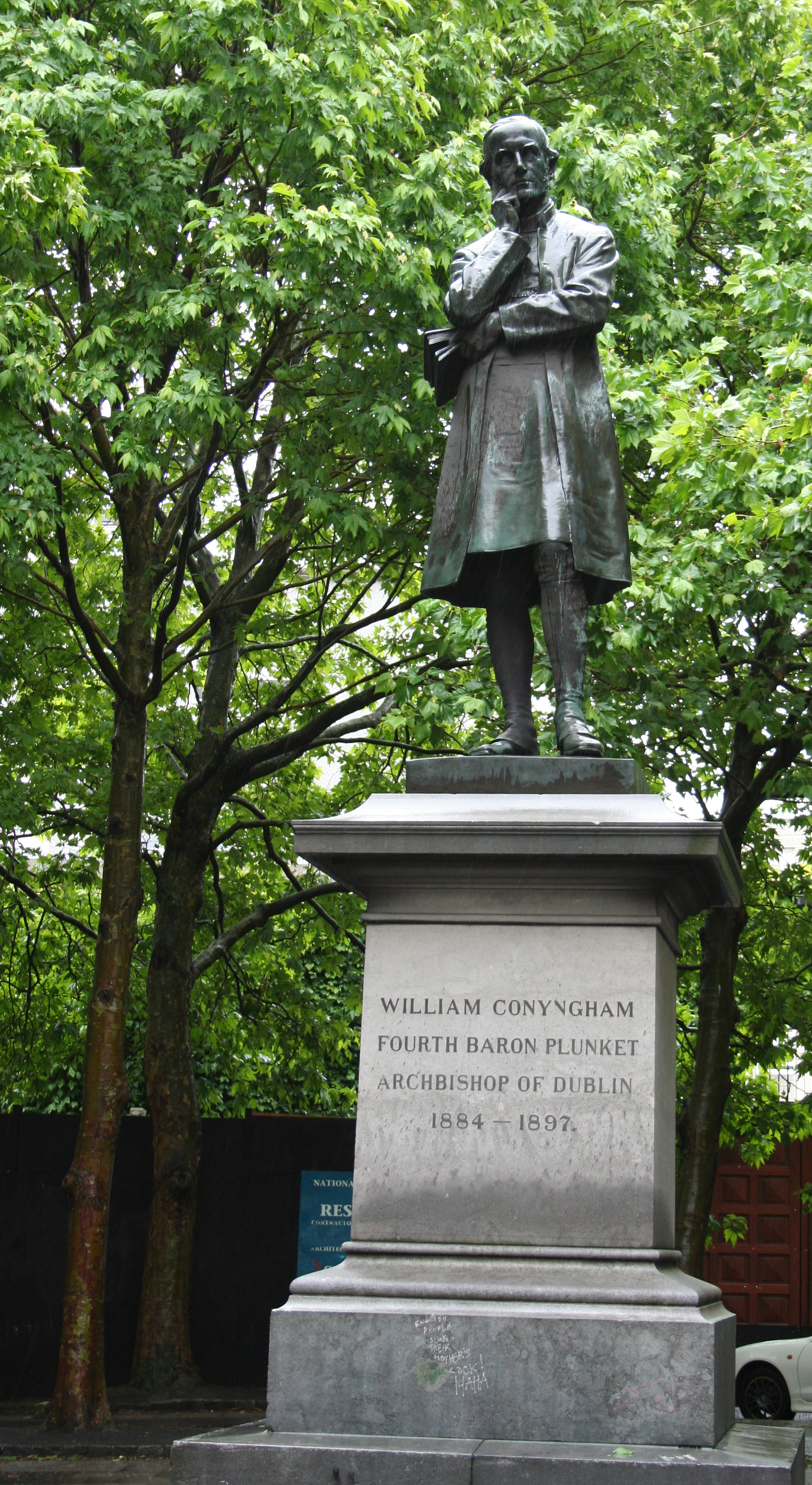
Monument to William Conyngham Fourth Baron Plunket in Kildare Street, Dublin near Leinster House

In 1864, he returned to Dublin as Treasurer of St Patrick's Cathedral, of which he was appointed Precentor in 1869. In 1871, on his father's death he became Lord Plunket and inherited Old Connaught, deciding to move into the house and surrounding property as he had spent a lot of time there with his grandfather. In 1876 he was consecrated Bishop of Meath, in which post he headed a council of bishops aiding the new Lusitanian Catholic Apostolic Evangelical Church in Portugal. He was also an advocate and supporter of the reformed faith in Spain and Italy.

In 1884 he was finally appointed Archbishop of Dublin, an office he held until his death, and Dean of Christ Church Cathedral, holding that latter post until 1887 (when he was succeeded by his brother-in-law's nephew William Greene). He also served as a Commissioner of Education from 1895 onwards and was a senator of the Royal University of Ireland. He was instrumental in developing the Kildare Place Schools (the Church of Ireland teacher training college),

Plunket received an honorary degree from Cambridge University in 1888. His wife having predeceased him in 1889, Lord Plunket died aged sixty-eight in Dublin, and he was buried in Mount Jerome Cemetery. His statue near Leinster House in Kildare Street, Dublin is a landmark.

== Coat of arms ==
Coat of arms of William Plunket, 4th Baron Plunket
Crest A horse passant Argent charged on the shoulder with a portcullis. Escutcheon Sable a bend a castle in chief and a portcullis in base Argent. Supporters Dexter an antelope Proper sinister a horse Argent both charged on the shoulder with a portcullis Sable. Motto Festina Lente

Church of Ireland titles
Preceded by Samuel Butcher	Bishop of Meath; 1876–1884	Succeeded by Charles Reichel
Preceded by Richard Chenevix Trench	Archbishop of Dublin; 1884–1897	Succeeded by Joseph Peacocke
Peerage of the United Kingdom
Preceded by John Plunket	Baron Plunket; 1871–1897	Succeeded by William Plunket
