= John Torrens =

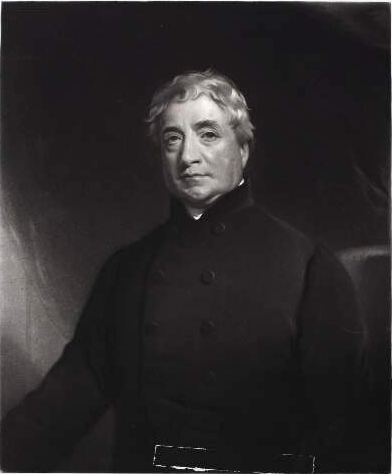
Ven. John Torrens

John Torrens (1768–1851) was an Irish Anglican priest in the 19th century.

Torrens was educated at Trinity College, Dublin. He was Archdeacon of Dublin from 1819 until his death on 9 June 1851.
