= William Plunket =

William Plunket may refer to:

- William Plunket, 1st Baron Plunket (1764–1854), British peer
- William Plunket, 4th Baron Plunket (1828–1897), British peer
- William Plunket, 5th Baron Plunket (1864–1920), British peer
