= Leslie Stevenson =

Leslie Stevenson may refer to:

- Leslie Stevenson (priest) (born 1959), Church of Ireland archdeacon of Meath and Kildare
- Leslie R. Stevenson (1915–1981), member of the Wisconsin State Assembly
