= Killaloe Cathedral =

Anglican Cathedral in County Clare, Ireland

Coordinates: 52.8065°N 8.43925°W

- St Flannan's Cathedral, Killaloe
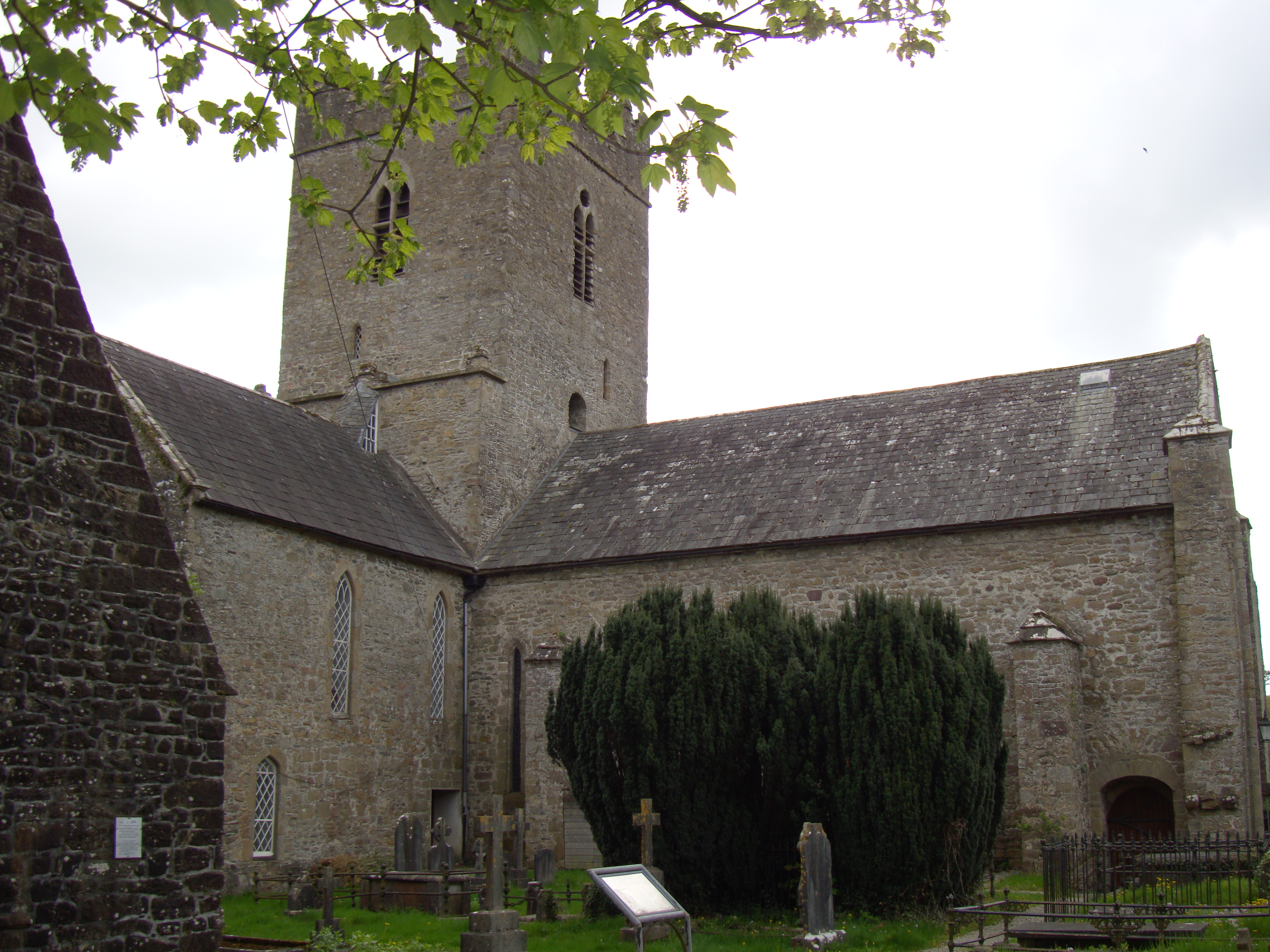
- St Flannan's Cathedral
- Killaloe Cathedral
- Location: Killaloe, County Clare
- Country: Ireland
- Denomination: Church of Ireland
- Previous denomination: Roman Catholic
- Website: cathedral.killaloe.anglican.org

History
- Dedication: Saint Flannan

Architecture
- Functional status: In use
- Heritage designation: National Monument
- Completed: 1225

Specifications
- Capacity: 400

Administration
- Province: Province of Dublin
- Diocese: Tuam, Limerick and Killaloe

Clergy
- Bishop: The Right Reverend Michael Burrows
- Dean: The Very Reverend Roderick Lindsay Smyth

The Cathedral Church of St Flannan, Killaloe (/ˌkɪləˈluː/ kil-ə-LOO) is a cathedral of the Church of Ireland in Killaloe, County Clare in Ireland.

Previously the cathedral of the Diocese of Killaloe, it is now one of five cathedrals in the Diocese of Tuam, Limerick and Killaloe. The Dean of the Cathedral is the Very Reverend Roderick Lindsay Smyth who is also Dean of Clonfert, Dean of Kilfenora and both Dean and Provost of Kilmacduagh

== Architecture ==
Killaloe Cathedral dates from the transition between the Romanesque and Gothic periods and was completed in 1225. The front is decorated with arabesque ornaments. On the north side of the cathedral is a small oratory or chapel (8.78 X 5.33 m (28ft 9 in X 17ft 6 in) of a date earlier than the cathedral; and probably the original sanctuary of the holy man who founded the abbey (Saint Molua (d. c 609)). Its roof is very deep, and made entirely of stone; it has a belfry, and two doorways to the east and west.

In the bell tower is a chime of eight bells cast by Matthew O'Byrne of Dublin in 1896. The heaviest bell weighs just over 500 kilograms.

== Recent restoration ==
A£200,000 restoration project involving the repair of a Romanesque doorway and the reconstruction of a 12th-century high cross, was completed in 2001. The Kilfenora Cross, embedded in the walls of the Gothic cathedral in the 1930s, is once again free-standing. The imposing 12-ft monument is now in the nave of the building.

== Burials ==
- John Rider (bishop)

== Gallery ==
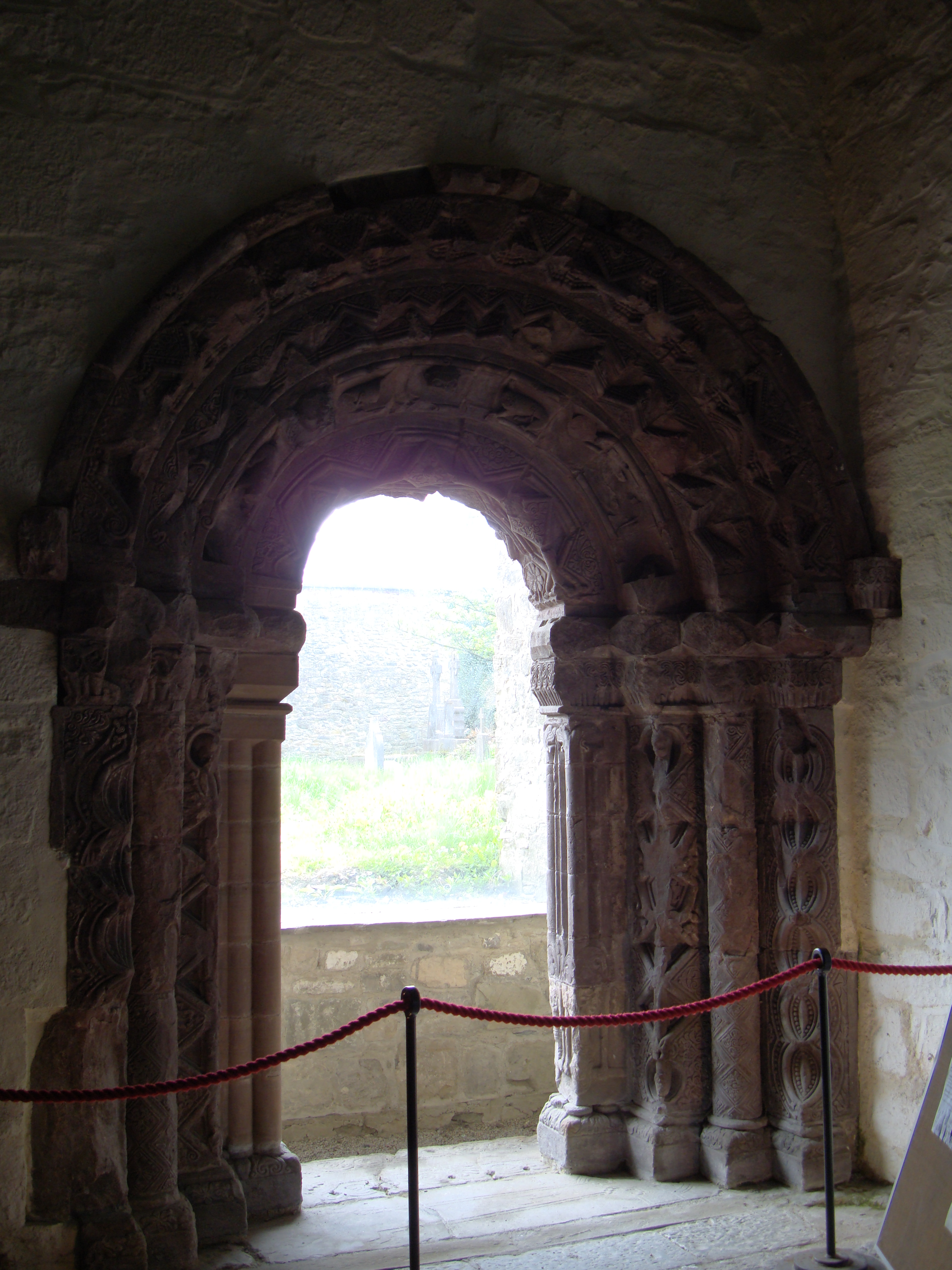
Romanesque doorway

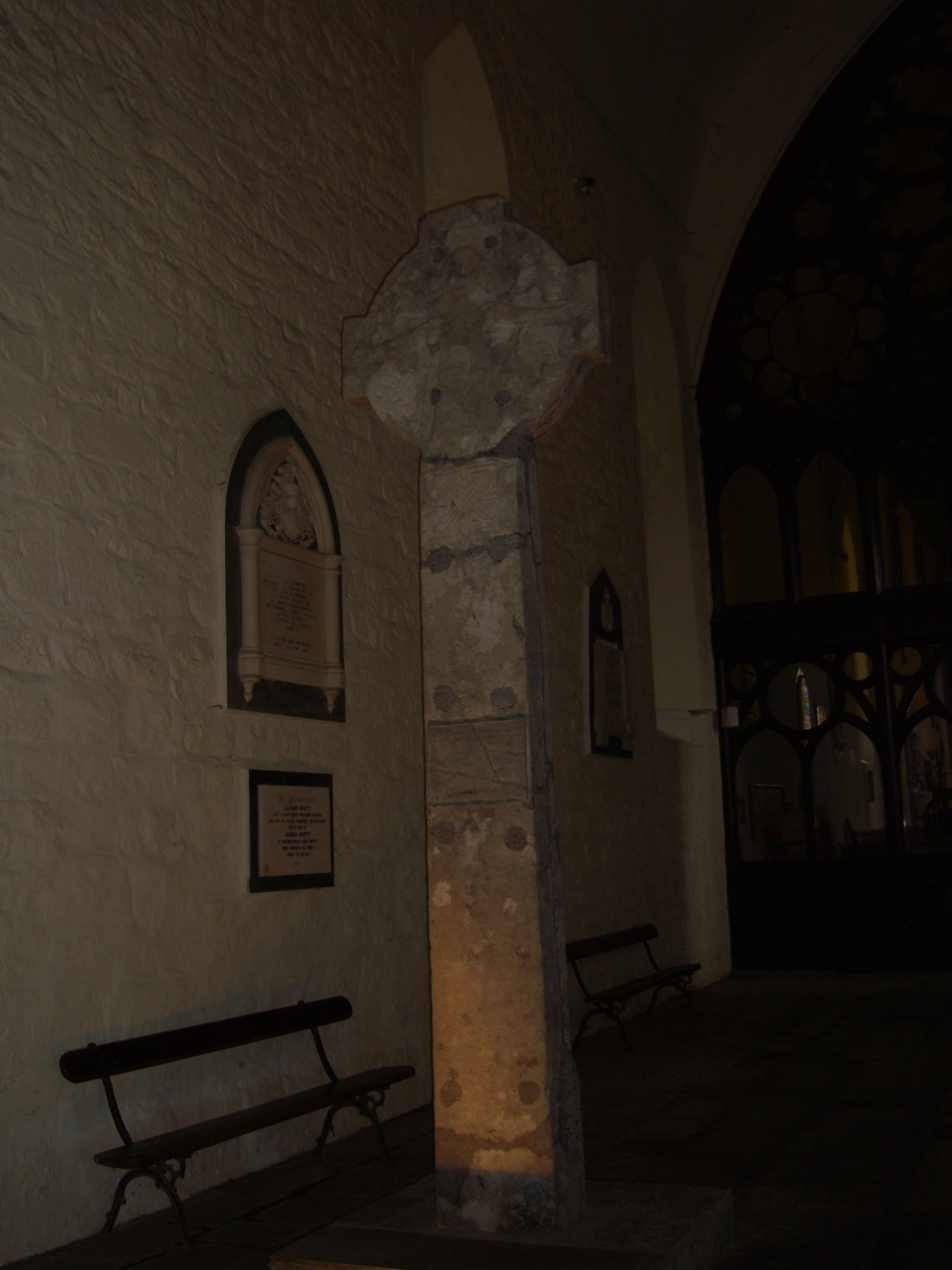
Kilfanora High Cross

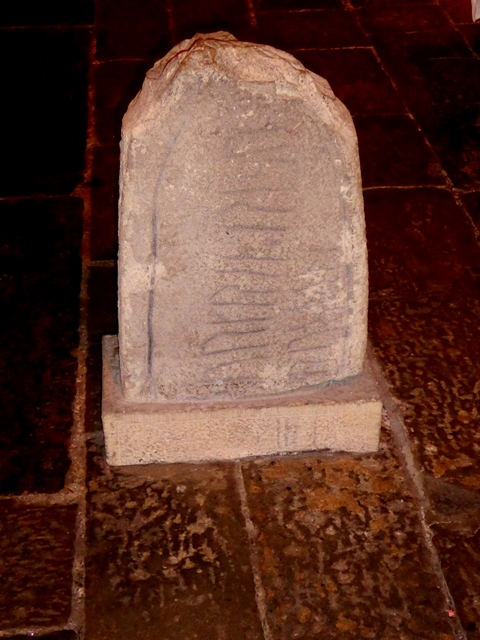
Killaloe Stone - front view with runic inscription

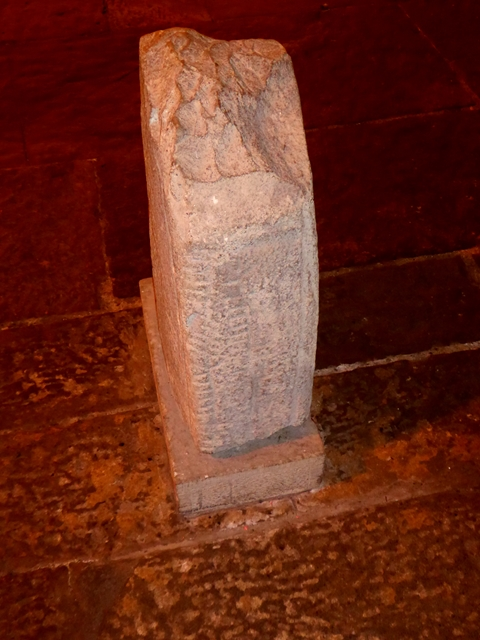
Killaloe Stone - side view with Ogham inscription

== See also ==
- Dean of Killaloe and Clonfert
- Ennis Cathedral
