= John Plunket, 3rd Baron Plunket =

Irish peer and Queen's Counsel

John Span Plunket, 3rd Baron Plunket of Newtown, County Cork (10 July 1793 – 16 April 1871) was an Irish peer and Queen's Counsel. He was the second son of William Plunket, 1st Baron Plunket, and Catherine MacAusland. He succeeded his brother Thomas Plunket, 2nd Baron Plunket in 1866. He married Charlotte, daughter of the eminent judge Charles Kendal Bushe and his wife Anne (Nancy) Crampton.

== Family ==
Children of John Span Plunket, 3rd Baron Plunket of Newton and Charlotte Bushe:

- Hon. Anna Plunket (1824–1900), who married John Darley, Bishop of Kilmore, Elphin and Ardagh.
- Most Rev. William Conyngham Plunket, 4th Baron Plunket of Newton, Archbishop of Dublin (26 August 1828 – 1 April 1897)
- Hon. Katherine Frances Plunket (d. 25 Aug 1881), who married Sir John Joscelyn Coghill, 4th Baronet.
- Hon. Charlotte Plunket (d. 30 May 1918), who married Thomas Barton and was the mother of Sir Dunbar Barton, 1st Baronet.
- Hon. Louisa Plunket, who married Richard Greene (son of Richard Wilson Greene) and had issue.
- David Robert Plunket, 1st and last Baron Rathmore (3 Dec 1838 – 22 Aug 1919)
- Hon. Arthur Cecil Crampton Plunket (11 May 1845 – 21 Oct 1884), m. 10 September 1870, Louisa Frances (née Hewitt)

Coat of arms of John Plunket, 3rd Baron Plunket
Crest A horse passant Argent charged on the shoulder with a portcullis. Escutcheon Sable a bend a castle in chief and a portcullis in base Argent. Supporters Dexter an antelope Proper sinister a horse Argent both charged on the shoulder with a portcullis Sable. Motto Festina Lente

Peerage of the United Kingdom
Preceded by Thomas Plunket	Baron Plunket; 1866–1871	Succeeded by William Plunket
