= Michael Jackson (bishop) =

Anglican Archbishop Of Dublin

The Most Reverend Michael Jackson
- Archbishop of Dublin; Bishop of Glendalough; Primate of Ireland
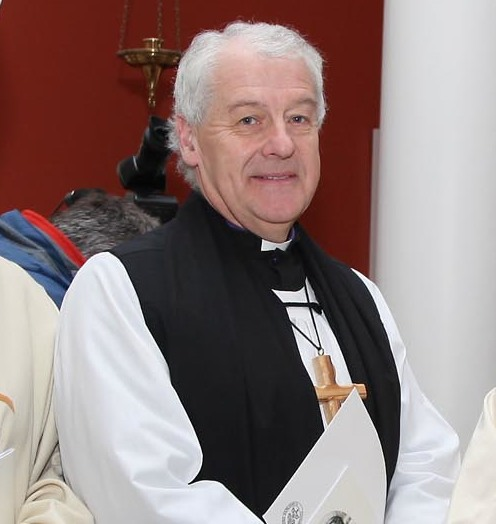
- Jackson in 2017
- Church: Church of Ireland
- Province: Dublin
- Diocese: Dublin and Glendalough
- Elected: 2 February 2011
- Installed: 8 May 2011
- Predecessor: John Neill
- Previous post: Bishop of Clogher

Orders
- Ordination: 1986 (deacon); 1987 (priest)
- Consecration: 6 March 2002 by Robin Eames

Personal details
- Born: Michael Geoffrey St Aubyn Jackson; 24 May 1956 (age 70) Lurgan, County Armagh, Northern Ireland
- Denomination: Anglicanism
- Spouse: Inez Cooke
- Children: 1
- Education: Trinity College, Dublin; St John's College, Cambridge

Styles of Michael Jackson
- Reference style: The Most Reverend
- Spoken style: Your Grace
- Religious style: Archbishop

Michael Geoffrey St Aubyn Jackson (born 24 May 1956) is a Church of Ireland Anglican bishop. Since 2011, he has served as the Archbishop of Dublin and Bishop of Glendalough in the Church of Ireland. He is also the co-chairman of the Porvoo Communion of Anglican and Lutheran churches.

== Early life and family ==
Jackson was born in Lurgan, County Armagh, Northern Ireland, the son of a Church of Ireland rector (latterly appointed Archdeacon of Elphin & Ardagh), and educated at Ballinamallard Primary School and Portora Royal School, Enniskillen. He achieved the Louis Claude Purser Entrance Scholarship to Trinity College, Dublin. In 1976, as only a Junior Freshman, he was elected as a scholar of the college in classics, the greatest undergraduate achievement. As a Senior Freshman was awarded the Bishop Berkeley Gold Medal for Greek. As a Sophister, he achieved a First in the Moderatorship Part I along with a Mullins Classical Exhibition, before finally taking a first class Moderatorship II in Classics and a gold medal, and graduating with a B.A. in 1979. He incepted to M.A. in 1982.

He read theology at Cambridge University where he was elected a foundation scholar of St John's College, Cambridge and took a First Class Tripos Part II in Theology and Religious Studies.

He is married to Inez Cooke, a medical doctor who was born in County Fermanagh, and they have one daughter, Camilla.

== Ecclesiastical career ==
He was ordained to the Anglican ministry as a deacon in 1986 and a priest in 1987. His first pastoral appointment was as a curate at Zion Parish, Dublin, and he also lectured at Trinity College Dublin and the Church of Ireland Theological College (now Institute). His next appointment was as college chaplain at Christ Church, Oxford, from 1989 to 1997 where was also a Student. He returned to Ireland and served as the incumbent of St Fin Barre's Union and Dean of Cork, from 1997 to 2002. Jackson has held many notable positions in the Church of Ireland, including chairmanship of the Church in Society Committee and, currently, chairmanship of the Board for Social Theology.

Jackson also plays an active role in the wider Anglican Communion, especially in the areas of ecumenism and inter-faith dialogue.

Jackson was elected Bishop of Clogher by the Church of Ireland House of Bishops on 21 November 2001 and consecrated at St Patrick's Anglican Cathedral, Armagh, on 6 March 2002. On 2 February 2011, he was elected Archbishop of Dublin and Bishop of Glendalough, and enthroned at Christ Church Cathedral, Dublin, on 8 May 2011, succeeding John Neill. Jackson has caused several controversies during his incumbency in Dublin, including a media fracas regarding comments about sectarianism made in a speech during the 2013 diocesan synod. There was also controversy over the closure of the 200 year old Church of Ireland College of Education and its amalgamation into Dublin City University, ending the historic link with Trinity College, Dublin.

Jackson declined to make a statement either in favor of or against the 2024 referendums on the family and care, citing the level of debate around the term "durable". Ultimately, both proposals were rejected by the voters.

He was created a Companion of the Roll of Honour of the Memorial of Merit of King Charles the Martyr in 2019.

Church of Ireland titles
Preceded by Brian Hannon	Bishop of Clogher; 2002–2011	Succeeded by John McDowell
Preceded by John Neill	Archbishop of Dublin; 2011–present	Incumbent
Order of precedence in Northern Ireland
Preceded by Dermot Farrell; Archbishop of Dublin (Roman Catholic)	Gentlemen; Church of Ireland Archbishop of Dublin	Succeeded by John McDowell; Archbishop of Armagh (Church of Ireland)
