= James Keene (bishop) =

Irish Anglican bishop

James Bennett Keene (25 October 1849 – 5 August 1919) was an Irish Anglican bishop in the Church of Ireland in the late 19th and early 20th centuries.

Keene was educated at Rathmines School and Trinity College, Dublin. He was ordained in 1879 and was the rector of Navan and headmaster of Navan College before his ordination to the episcopate as the Bishop of Meath. He died on 5 August 1919 and two years later his wife published a memorial to him.

Religious titles
Preceded by Joseph Ferguson Peacocke	Bishop of Meath; 1897 – 1919	Succeeded by Benjamin John Plunket
