= Charles Mellon =

Irish cricketer (1915–1991)

Personal information
- Full name: Charles William Mellon
- Born: 9 February 1915; Dublin, Ireland
- Died: 16 November 1991 (aged 76); Dublin, Leinster, Ireland
- Batting: Right-handed
- Bowling: Right-arm medium

Domestic team information
- Years: Team
- 1937–1938: Ireland

Career statistics
Competition	First-class
Matches	2
Runs scored	48
Batting average	12.00
100s/50s	–/–
Top score	38
Balls bowled	12
Wickets	0
Bowling average	–
5 wickets in innings	–
10 wickets in match	–
Best bowling	–
Catches/stumpings	1/–
- Source: Cricinfo, 3 November 2018

Charles William Mellon (9 February 1915 – 16 November 1991) was an Irish first-class cricketer.

Mellon was born at Dublin in February 1915, where he was educated at Sandford Park School. After leaving Sandford Park, he went up to Trinity College, Dublin, where he played club cricket for Dublin University Cricket Club. He made his debut in first-class cricket for Ireland against Scotland at Belfast in 1937. The following year, he made a second first-class appearance against Scotland at Glasgow. Across his two first-class matches, Mellon scored a total of 48 runs at an average of 12.00, with a highest score of 38. His second match against Scotland marked his final appearance for Ireland, with Mellon playing very little club cricket after this match. Outside of cricket, he worked as the managing director of an animal foods company. He died at Dublin in November 1991.
