= Arthur Ross (bishop) =

- Born: 18 December 1869; Montenotte, Cork, Ireland
- Died: 24 May 1923 (aged 53); Dublin, Ireland
- Education: Trinity College, Dublin
- Church: Church of Ireland
- Ordained: 1895
- Offices held: Vicar of Holywood Parish; Canon of St Patrick's Cathedral; Chancellor of Down Cathedral; Bishop of Tuam, Killala and Achonry (1920–1923)

Arthur Edwin Ross MC* (18 December 1869 – 24 May 1923) was a cleric in the Church of Ireland.

Ross was born in 1869 in Montenotte, Cork, the son of David Ross of Glenageary and Anne Maria (née Neligan). He was educated at Trinity College, Dublin and was ordained in 1895. He was Rector of Ballymena and a World War I Chaplain. Soon after he was appointed in the spring of 1916, an assistant chaplain-general wrote of him, ‘obviously good and keen on his work. A trifle old for the work. A real good man in every way. Quiet but does excellent work and will win through sheer goodness’. His age did not hamper Ross’s ability to rescue ‘wounded men under heavy shell fire’for which he was awarded his first Military Cross. A bar was added early in 1918 soon after he had been promoted to senior chaplain. The citation referred to "Conspicuous gallantry and devotion to duty. He carried in wounded under circumstances of great danger and difficulty. He ended by helping to carry a wounded officer for over four hours. He was the means of saving many lives, and inspired the stretcher-bearers to work to the utmost limit of endurance". Following the war, he was appointed Vicar of Holywood Parish, Canon of St Patrick's Cathedral and Chancellor of Down Cathedral. In 1920, he was appointed to the episcopate as the fifth (since union) Bishop of Tuam, Killala and Achonry.

In 1909 he married Mary Elizabeth Linzee Hezlet, a prominent golfer. He died in Dublin on 24 May 1923.

Church of England titles
Preceded by Benjamin Plunket	Bishop of Tuam, Killala, and Achonry; 1920 –1923	Succeeded by John Orr
