= John Neill (archbishop of Dublin) =

Irish clergyman

The Right Reverend John Neill
- Archbishop of Dublin; Primate of Ireland
- Church: Church of Ireland
- Diocese: Dublin and Glendalough
- Elected: 29 August 2002
- In office: 2002–2011
- Predecessor: Walton Empey
- Successor: Michael Jackson
- Previous posts: Bishop of Tuam, Killala and Achonry (1986–1997); Bishop of Cashel and Ossory (1997–2002)

Orders
- Ordination: 1970
- Consecration: 25 January 1986 by John Armstrong

Personal details
- Born: 17 December 1945 (age 80)
- Denomination: Anglican
- Children: 3

John Robert Winder Neill (born 17 December 1945) was the Church of Ireland Archbishop of Dublin until the end of January 2011.

The fourth generation of his family to become a clergyman, John Neill was educated in Dublin at the Avoca School and at Sandford Park. He attended Trinity College Dublin studying Hebrew and oriental languages winning a scholarship in 1965 and graduating in 1966. He subsequently studied at Jesus College and Ridley Hall, Cambridge. He became a deacon in 1969, a priest in 1970, and a bishop in 1986.

== Affiliations ==
- Member, Governing Body of University College Galway (1986–97)
- Academic Council of the Irish School of Ecumenics
- President, Council of Churches for Britain and Ireland (1990–94)
- President of Churches Together in Britain and Ireland (1999–2002)
- Anglican Chairman of Porvoo Contact Group since 1998
- Member, Central Committee of the World Council of Churches

At the Lambeth Conference in 1988 he proposed all the approved resolutions in respect of Women in the Episcopate and was chairman of the Church of Ireland General Synod Committee on Ordination of Women (1988–91). He has served on many central committees of the Church of Ireland covering issues such as liturgical reform, education, communications, ministry, Christian unity and synodical structures. He was co-founder and chairman of the Church of Ireland/Methodist Church Joint Theological Working Party.

== Family ==
Neill and his wife Betty have three sons:

- The Reverend Canon Stephen Neill, Rector of Celbridge, whose wife, Rev Nicola Harvey-Neill was ordained by her father-in-law while he was Bishop of Tuam, Killala and Achonry.
- Andrew Neill, a member of the Garda Síochána
- Peter Neill, a photographer

== Pastoral ministry positions ==
- 1969–1971: Curate of St Paul's Glenageary, Dublin
- 1971–1974: Bishop's Vicar, Diocesan Registrar and Librarian, St Canice's Cathedral, Ossory
- 1974–1978: Incumbent of Abbeystrewry Union (Ross)
- 1978–1984: St Bartholomew's with Christ Church, Leeson Park (Dublin)
- 1984–1986: Archdeacon of Waterford
- 1986–1997: Bishop of Tuam, Killalla and Achonry
- 1997–2002: Bishop of Cashel and Ossory (Elected 23 April 1997; consecrated later that month)
- 2002–2011: Archbishop of Dublin, Bishop of Glendalough, Primate of Ireland, and Metropolitan (Elected on 29 August 2002)

Church of Ireland titles
Preceded by John Coote Duggan	Bishop of Tuam, Killala and Achonry; 1986–1997	Succeeded by Richard Crosbie Aitken Henderson
Preceded by Noel Vincent Willoughby	Bishop of Cashel and Ossory; 1997–2002	Succeeded by Peter Barrett
Preceded by Walton Empey	Archbishop of Dublin; 2002–2011	Succeeded by Michael Jackson
