= John Orr (bishop) =

Anglican bishop

John Orr was a 20th-century Anglican Bishop.

Born in 1874 and educated at Trinity College, Dublin, Orr was ordained in 1900. He began his ministry with curacies at St John's, Dublin and All Saints, Aghade, and St Nicholas, Dundalk and Kilmore Cathedral. In 1912 he became rector of Sligo and in 1917 appointed Dean of Tuam. In 1923 he became Bishop of Tuam and in 1927 was translated to Meath. He died in post on 21 July 1938.

== Notes ==
Religious titles
Preceded by Arthur Edward Ross	Bishop of Tuam, Killala and Achonry; 1923 – 1927	Succeeded by John Mason Harden
Preceded by Thomas Gibson George Collins	Bishop of Meath; 1927 – 1938	Succeeded by William Hardy Holmes
