= Graham Knuttel =

Irish painter and sculptor (1954–2023)

- Born: 10 March 1954; Dublin, Ireland
- Died: 27 May 2023 (aged 69)
- Education: Dún Laoghaire Institute of Art, Design and Technology
- Occupations: Painter, sculptor
- Spouse: Ruth Mathers

Graham Knuttel (10 March 1954 – 27 May 2023) was an Irish painter and sculptor, whose work has been collected by various celebrities, such as Sylvester Stallone, Robert De Niro, Frank Sinatra, Eddie Jordan and Michael Stipe. Initially known for sculpture, he was later notably primarily as a painter.

== Early life and education ==
Knuttel was born in Dublin on 10 March 1954, several years after his parents had moved to Ireland from England. His father was born in Germany and was Jewish; he had emigrated to England with his mother after World War I and served with the RAF. Graham's mother was a Unitarian from Northampton. Knuttel's brother and a nephew are also artists.

Knuttel attended Sandford Park School, later graduating from the Dún Laoghaire school of Art and Design with a Diploma in Fine Art Sculpture.

== Career ==
Knuttel drew, painted and made sculptures. He worked with figure drawing and painting, and was inspired in part by Cezanne and Picasso.

In 1976 he won the Royal Canada Trust Award for young Sculptors.

In 1981 he co-founded Wicklow Fine Art Press. He received commissions to paint Sylvester Stallone, Christy Moore, John B. Keane and Don King.

In 2008 An Post released two Knuttel-designed stamps to commemorate the Summer Olympics that year.

== Death ==
Knuttel died on 27 May 2023, at the age of 69.
