= Thomas Plunket, 2nd Baron Plunket =

Irish bishop

Styles of The Lord Plunket
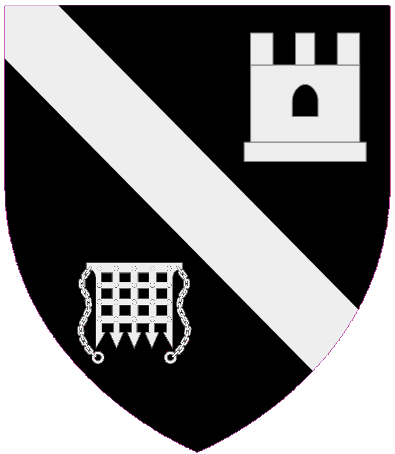
- Reference style: The Most Reverend and Right Honourable
- Spoken style: My Lord
- Religious style: Bishop

Thomas Span Plunket, 2nd Baron Plunket (1792–1866), was Bishop of Tuam, Killala and Achonry.

Plunket was the first son of William Plunket, 1st Baron Plunket and his wife, Catherine (née McCausland). He was educated at St John's College, Cambridge. He served as Dean of Down from 1831 to 1839 before being elevated to the episcopacy as Bishop of Tuam, Killala and Achonry in 1839, a position he held until his death in 1866. He moved to live on a private estate at Tourmakeady, where he evicted many Catholic families for not sending their children to the Protestant school. In 1852 Plunket increased his holdings to over 10,000 acres, and his 203 tenants were recorded as paying an annual rent of 2000 pounds. Plunket was a champion of the “second reformation”, an evangelical campaign which ran from the 1820’s to the 1860’s.

On the death of his father in 1854, he became the 2nd Baron Plunket. On his death, he was succeeded as Baron Plunket by his younger brother. His middle name is taken from his maternal grandmother, Elizabeth (née Span). He was buried in the churchyard of his now-ruined church at Tourmakeady.

== Family ==
On 26 October 1819, Plunket married Louisa-Jane (1798–1893), 2nd daughter of John William Foster of Fanevalley, County Louth.

Their children were:

- Katherine Plunket (1820–1932) - the longest-lived Irish person ever
- Emily (d. Rome, 1843)
- Mary
- Frederica Plunket (1838–1886)
- Gertrude (1 February 1841 – 1924)

Coat of arms of Thomas Plunket, 2nd Baron Plunket

Crest
A horse passant Argent charged on the shoulder with a portcullis.
Escutcheon
Sable a bend a castle in chief and a portcullis in base Argent.
Supporters
Dexter an antelope Proper sinister a horse Argent both charged on the shoulder with a portcullis Sable.
Motto
Festina Lente

Church of Ireland titles
Preceded by Power Le Poer Trench as Archbishop of Tuam	Bishop of Tuam, Killala and Achonry; 1839–1866	Succeeded by Charles Bernard
Peerage of the United Kingdom
Preceded by William Plunket	Baron Plunket; 1854–1866	Succeeded by John Plunket
