= Leslie Stevenson (priest) =

The Venerable Leslie Stevenson
- Archdeacon of Meath and of Kildare
- Church: Church of Ireland
- Province: Province of Dublin
- Diocese: Diocese of Meath and Kildare
- In office: since 2009

Personal details
- Born: Leslie Thomas Clayton Stevenson; 1959 (age 66–67)
- Denomination: Anglicanism
- Spouse: Ruth Stevenson
- Children: 1 daughter
- Education: Trinity College, Dublin

Leslie Thomas Clayton Stevenson (born 1959) became the Church of Ireland Archdeacon of Meath and Kildare in 2009.

Stevenson was educated at Trinity College, Dublin and ordained in 1984. In 2013, he was elected Bishop of Meath and Kildare by the Electoral College formed for that purpose, but declined the appointment.

He served at

- Dundela (Curate)
- Kilore and Inch (Incumbent)
- Donaghadee (Incumbent)
- Portarlington (Incumbent)
