= David Pierpoint =

Irish Anglican priest

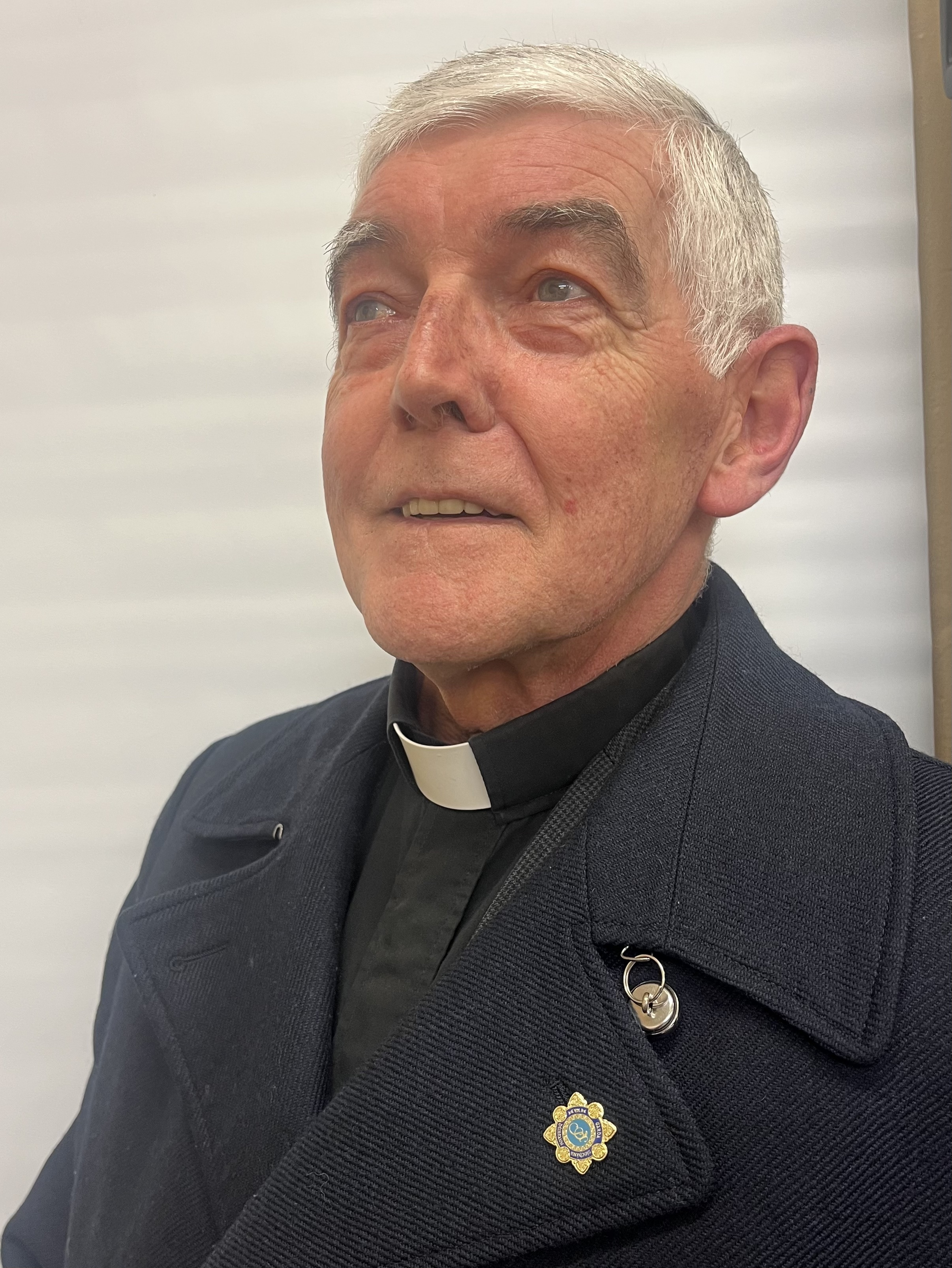
David Pierpoint in 2026

David Alfred Pierpoint is an Irish Anglican priest; he has been Archdeacon of Dublin since 2004.

Pierpoint was born in 1956 and ordained in 1988. He was Non Stipendiary Minister at Athboy with Ballivor and Killallon; Killiney and Ballybrack; and Narraghmore and Timolin with Castledermot until 1991 when he became Chancellor of St Patrick's Cathedral, Dublin. In 1995 he became Vicar of the Christ Church Cathedral Group of Parishes, which includes All Saints' Grangegorman, St Werburgh's and St Michan's, and in 2004 Archdeacon of Dublin.

After studying at All Hallows College, he gained a Masters in Management and Leadership from Dublin City University in 2007. He has served as chaplain to the Gardaí.
