= James O'Sullivan (bishop) =

Irish 20th century Anglican bishop

James O'Sullivan was an Irish 20th century Anglican bishop.

Born in 1834, he was educated at Trinity College, Dublin and ordained in 1858. He was Rector of Rahoon and then of St Nicholas, Galway. From 1888, he was Archdeacon of Tuam and then, from 1890, the 57th Bishop of Tuam, the 56th Bishop of Killala and the 57th of Achonry. He died in post on 10 January 1915.

Church of Ireland titles
Preceded by Charles Brodrick Bernard	Bishop of Tuam, Killala and Achonry; 1890 – 1915	Succeeded by Benjamin John Plunket
