= John Harden =

John Mason Harden, MRIA (3 July 1871 – 2 October 1931) was an Irish bishop and educator who later served as Bishop of Tuam, Killala and Achonry from 1927 to 1931.

Harden was educated at Rathmines School, Dublin and Trinity College, Dublin. He was ordained in the Church of Ireland in 1898, and his first post was a curacy at St Matthew's Church, Dublin. He was then chaplain of Kirwan House the Female Orphan House, Dublin from 1899 to 1901, the principal of the Training College of Lusitanian Church, headmaster of Kilkenny College, Vice Principal of the London College of Divinity, and chaplain and headmaster of The King's Hospital, Dublin before appointment to the episcopate. He became a Doctor of Divinity.

Harden had three children, including the archaeologist and museum curator Donald Harden.

Church of England titles
Preceded by John Orr	Bishop of Tuam, Killala and Achonry; 1927–1931	Succeeded by William Hardy Holmes
