= Patrick Rooke =

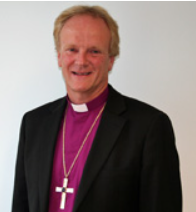
Patrick Rooke in the Church of Ireland Diocese of Connor Website

Patrick William Rooke (born 1955) was the Bishop of Tuam, Killala, and Achonry in the Church of Ireland. He retired on 31 October 2021.

Born on 12 April 1955, he was educated at Sandford Park School and Salisbury and Wells Theological College; and ordained in 1979. He began his ecclesiastical career with curacies in Newtownabbey and Ballywillan, then held incumbencies at Craigs and Ballymore. He was Dean of Armagh from 2006 until 2011.

Church of Ireland titles
Preceded by Herbert Cassidy	Dean of Armagh; 2006–2011	Succeeded by Gregory Dunstan
Preceded by Richard Crosbie Aitken Henderson	Bishop of Tuam, Killala, and Achonry; 2011–2021	Succeeded by Diocese merged into Diocese of Tuam, Limerick and Killaloe
