= Power Le Poer Trench =

Irish clergyman

The Right Reverend and Right Honourable Power Le Poer Trench PC (Ire)
- Archbishop of Tuam
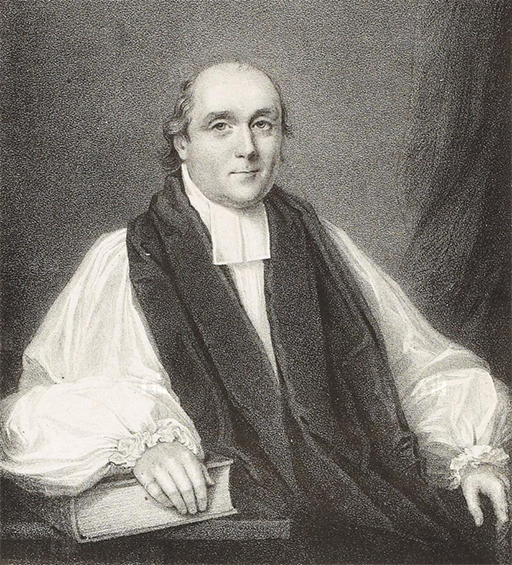
- Archdiocese: Tuam
- Installed: 1819
- Predecessor: William Beresford, Archbishop of Tuam
- Successor: Thomas Plunket, Bishop of Tuam, Killala and Achonry
- Previous posts: Bishop of Waterford and Lismore 1802–1810; Bishop of Elphin 1810–1819

Orders
- Consecration: 21 November 1802 by William Beresford

Personal details
- Born: 10 June 1770
- Died: 25 March 1839 (aged 68)
- Parents: William Trench, 1st Earl of Clancarty and Anne Gardiner
- Spouse: Anne Taylor
- Children: 2 sons and 6 daughters

Power Le Poer Trench (1770–1839) was an Anglican clergyman who served in the Church of Ireland as firstly Bishop of Waterford and Lismore, then Bishop of Elphin and finally Archbishop of Tuam.

== Life ==
He was the second surviving son of William Trench, 1st Earl of Clancarty, among his nine brothers and nine sisters was his elder brother Richard Trench, 2nd Earl of Clancarty, and Lady Emily La Touche was a younger sister. Born in Sackville Street, Dublin, on 10 June 1770, he was first educated at a preparatory school at Putney, whence he went for a short time to Harrow, and afterwards at the academy of Mr. Ralph at Castlebar, in the immediate neighbourhood of his home. Trench matriculated at Trinity College, Dublin, on 2 July 1787, where his tutor was Matthew Young, afterwards bishop of Clonfert and Kilmacduagh, and graduated B.A. on 13 July 1791. Later in the same year (27 November) Trench was ordained deacon, and, having received priest's orders on 24 June 1792, he was in the same month inducted into the benefice of Creagh, in which his father's residence and the great fair town of Ballinasloe were situated. In the following year (5 November 1793) he was presented to the benefice of Rawdenstown, County Meath. He obtained a faculty to hold the two cures together, and combined with their clerical duties the business of agent on his father's Galway estate. Trench was a man of great bodily strength and a fine horseman, and he retained a fondness for field sports to the end of his days. During the Irish rebellion of 1798 he acted as a captain in the local yeomanry raised by his father to resist the French invading army under Humbert.

In 1802 Trench was appointed to the see of Waterford, in succession to Richard Marlay, and was consecrated on 21 November 1802. In 1810 he was translated to the bishopric of Elpin, and, on the death of Archbishop Beresford, was on 4 October 1819 advanced to the archepiscopal see of Tuam. In May 1834, on the death of James Verschoyle, the united sees of Killala and Achonry were, under the provisions of the Irish Church Temporalities Act, added to the charge of Trench. By the same act, the archdiocese of Tuam was reduced, on Trench's death, to an ordinary bishopric.

In the history of the Irish church, Trench was an important figure. This is mostly because of his promotion of the evangelical movement in the west of Ireland which was known in Connaught as the Second Reformation, and which, chiefly through the agency of the Irish Society, attempted to turn converts to Protestantism. From 1818 to his death Trench was president of the Irish Society. Holding strong views in favour of 'open bible,' Trench was also an opponent of the mixed system of national education founded by Mr. Stanley (Lord Derby), and was one of the founders of the Church Education Society.

He died on 26 March 1839. Trench married, on 29 January 1795, his cousin Anne, daughter of Walter Taylor of Castle Taylor, County Galway. With her, he had two sons, William and Power, and six daughters. Elizabeth, his third daughter, married Captain Henry Gascoyne in 1830. Another daughter, Anne, married James O'Hara, MP for Galway in 1823.

Church of Ireland titles
Preceded by Richard Marlay	Bishop of Waterford and Lismore; 1802–1810	Succeeded by Joseph Stock
Preceded by John Law	Bishop of Elphin; 1810–1819	Succeeded by John Powell Leslie
Preceded by William Beresford	Archbishop of Tuam; 1819–1839	Succeeded by Thomas Plunket as Bishop of Tuam, Killala and Achonry
