= Benjamin Plunket =

Irish Anglican bishop (1870–1947)

Benjamin John Plunket (1 August 1870 – 26 January 1947) was a 20th-century Anglican bishop in Ireland.

Plunket was the son of William Plunket, 4th Baron Plunket, and Anne Lee Guinness (sister of the Lord Ardilaun). Born in Bray on 1 August 1870, he was educated at the Harrow School and Corpus Christi College, Cambridge. Ordained in 1896, he began his career with a curacy at St Peter's Phibsboro. He was then Rector of Aghade with Ardoyne and subsequently Vicar of St Ann's, Dublin. In 1913, he became Bishop of Tuam, Killala and Achonry, and in 1919 was translated to Bishop of Meath. He retired in 1925, and died on 26 January 1947.

The Irish Times, when reporting his death, characterised Plunket as ‘a Churchman of broad views … [who] was not afraid to utter his opinions’. Probably his most notable stand was in 1910 when, on the accession of King George V, parliament passed an act to delete terms offensive to Roman Catholics from the Royal Accession Declaration. The old Declaration, introduced in 1678, repudiated the Mass, transubstantiation and the invocation of the Virgin Mary and the saints. The modified form of the Declaration was widely opposed, but Plunket was the principal promoter of a petition to the House of Commons in support of it, signed by over 3,000 representative Irish Protestants. On another occasion, he was one of three Church of Ireland bishops who, with eighteen Catholic bishops, signed a controversial anti-partition manifesto issued before the Longford by-election of May 1917; the manifesto was a significant factor in Sinn Féin's narrow victory in the by-election. Plunket was also an Irish language enthusiast, encouraging Irish in Church of Ireland schools and hymns in Irish at church services. In 1925, while still Bishop of Meath, he was severely criticised by W. B. Yeats in the latter's famous speech in the Senate on divorce. Plunket's uncompromising approach to sexual morality and the indissolubility of marriage had, as Yeats saw it, given succour to those intent on passing legislation which the Protestant minority would find oppressive. Shortly afterwards, he resigned as Bishop of Meath on health grounds when aged 55.

He was left the St. Anne's Park estate in Raheny in Dublin, formerly the residence of his uncle Lord Ardilaun, following the death of Lady Ardilaun, in 1937 due to the cost of the estate he sold it to Dublin Corporation, keeping Sybil Hill and 30 acres as his residence, his former residence is now St. Paul's College, Raheny.

In 1900, he married Dorothea Hester Butler (1874-1936), the daughter of Sir Thomas Butler, 10th Bt. Their daughter Olive married Peter Wentworth-Fitzwilliam, 8th Earl Fitzwilliam in 1933.

Religious titles
Preceded by James O'Sullivan	Bishop of Tuam, Killala and Achonry; 1913 – 1919	Succeeded by Arthur Edwin Ross
Preceded by James Bennett Keene	Bishop of Meath; 1919 – 1925	Succeeded by Thomas Gibson George Collins
