= Robert Miller (archdeacon) =

Priest in the Church of Ireland

The Venerable Robert Stephen Miller

Archdeacon of Derry
- In office 2012–2026
- Succeeded by: Robert Boyd

Personal details
- Born: August 1971 (age 55)
- Education: Queen's University, Belfast; Church of Ireland Theological College

Robert Stephen Miller (born August 1971) is a Church of Ireland priest.

== Biography ==
Miller was educated at Queen's University Belfast and the Church of Ireland Theological College; and ordained in 1995. After a curacy at Lurgan he held incumbencies at Tullylish, Maghera and Derry. Since 2012 he has been the Archdeacon of Derry and rector of the joint group of parishes of Christ church, St Peter’s, Culmore and Muff. He ministers alongside his curate of the parishes, the Reverend Canon Katherine McAteer, who is the first female ordained minister within the diocese to be appointed as a canon of the chapter of St Columb's Cathedral in its over 400 years history.

His twin brother is Paul Miller, a consultant in general adult psychiatry and onetime health adviser to ex-Democratic Unionist Party MP Iris Robinson.

Robert has catalogued the varieties of paving stone used in town centres across Northern Ireland; this work, Under our Feet, was published privately in September 2017.

Robert announced to his congregations on 2 August 2026 that he would be leaving the diocese at the end of September. He has been appointed Chaplain to Hampton Court Palace in London. His final service in Derry was the Harvest Service at Christ Church on 27 September.
