= John Duggan (bishop) =

Irish bishop

John Coote Duggan (7 April 1918 – 20 July 2000) was the 11th Bishop of Tuam, Killala, and Achonry from 1970 to 1985.

Educated at The High School, Dublin and Trinity College, Dublin and ordained in 1942, his first post was a curacy at St Luke's, Cork. He was later the incumbent at Portarlington, then St Paul's Glenageary, Dublin and finally (before his ordination to the episcopate) Archdeacon of Tuam.

Church of Ireland titles
Preceded by Arthur Hamilton Butler	Bishop of Tuam, Killala, and Achonry; 1970 –1985	Succeeded by John Robert Winder Neill
