= Archdeacon of Dublin =

Province of Dublin
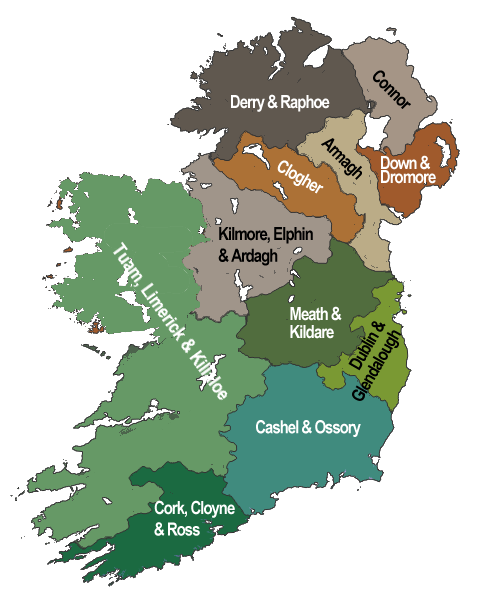
- Church: Church of Ireland
- Metropolitan bishop: Archbishop of Dublin
- Cathedral: Christ Church Cathedral, Dublin
- Dioceses: 5

The Archdeacon of Dublin is a senior ecclesiastical officer within the Anglican Diocese of Dublin and Glendalough. The Archdeacon is responsible for the disciplinary supervision of the clergy within the Dublin part of the diocese, which is by far the largest.

The archdeaconry can trace its history back to Torquil, who held the office at some point during Lorcán Ua Tuathail's reign as Archbishop of Dublin and is theorised by George Thomas Stokes to have been of Danish descent. The current incumbent is David Pierpoint. In between, many of them went on to higher office:

- William Chaumbre
- Geoffrey de Turville
- Nicholas de Clere
- Nicholas Hill
- Robert Dyke
- Thomas Bache
- Henry Ussher
- Launcelot Bulkeley
- Richard Reader
- Enoch Reader
- Richard Pococke
- Robert Fowler
- James Saurin
- John Winthrop Crozier
- Samuel Greenfield Poyntz
- Noel Vincent Willoughby
- Robert Warke
- Gordon Linney
