= John Crozier (bishop of Tuam, Killala and Achonry) =

Church of Ireland bishop (1879–1966)

John Winthrop Crozier (10 December 1879 – 14 February 1966) was the ninth Bishop of Tuam, Killala and Achonry from 1939 to 1957.

Crozier was born in Belfast, the son of Rev. John Baptist Crozier. Educated at Portora Royal School and Trinity College, Dublin and ordained in 1903, his first post was a curacy in Banbridge. He was later Rector of Celbridge, Vicar of St Ann's Dublin, a temporary chaplain to the Forces, Canon of Christ Church Cathedral, Dublin and finally (before his appointment to the episcopate) Archdeacon of Dublin. During his 17 months as a Temporary Chaplain to the Forces, he served in Gallipoli and was mentioned in despatches He had become a Doctor of Divinity.

He died in Dublin in February 1966.

Church of Ireland titles
Preceded by William Hardy Holmes	Bishop of Tuam, Killala and Achonry; 1939–1957	Succeeded by Arthur Butler
