= Abbeystrewry =

Civil parish in County Cork, Ireland

Coordinates: 51.5486°N 9.2636°W

Abbeystrewry, also Abbeystrowry, is a parish, formerly within the Diocese of Ross and a civil parish in the barony of Carbery East, in County Cork, Ireland.
