= Arthur Butler (bishop) =

Irish bishop

Arthur Hamilton Butler MBE (8 March 1912 – 6 July 1991) was an Irish bishop in the Church of Ireland in the second half of the 20th century.

Born on 8 March 1912 and educated at Friars School, Bangor and Trinity College Dublin, he was ordained in 1936 and began his career as a curate at Monkstown, Dublin. London curacies at Christ Church, Crouch End and Holy Trinity, Brompton were followed by six years as Army Chaplain. In 1945 he returned to Monkstown as incumbent, a post he held until his ordination to the episcopate as the 10th Bishop of Tuam, Killala and Achonry in 1958. He was translated to be Bishop of Connor in 1969 and retired in 1981. He died 6 July 1991.

Church of Ireland titles
Preceded by John Winthrop Crozier	Bishop of Tuam, Killala and Achonry; 1957 – 1969	Succeeded by John Coote Duggan
Preceded by Robert Cyril Hamilton Glover Elliott	Bishop of Connor; 1969 – 1981	Succeeded by William John McCappin
