= Richard Henderson (bishop) =

Richard Crosbie Aitken Henderson is a clergyman who has served with the Church of Ireland and the Church of England. Until 31 January 2011 he was Bishop of Tuam, Killala, and Achonry.

Born on 27 March 1957, a son of Peter Henderson, Baron Henderson of Brompton he was educated at Westminster and Magdalen College, Oxford, initially studying botany and earning a doctorate with a thesis on "The Genetics and Applications of Copper Resistance in Yeast".

He was ordained in 1987 and began his ecclesiastical career in the Diocese of Oxford as curate of Chinnor with Emmington. He moved to Ireland in 1989 and held incumbencies in the Diocese of Cork, Cloyne and Ross, including Rector of Abbeystrewry Union, Skibberreen. He was Dean of Ross from 1995 to 1998 when he was elected bishop of Tuam, Killala, and Achonry.

In 2007 his wife Anita was received into the Roman Catholic Church. In January 2011 he retired as bishop to return to parochial ministry in England, becoming Team Vicar in the Heart of Eden and an Honorary Assistant Bishop within the Diocese of Carlisle in March 2011.

On his election as bishop, it was reported that "Dean Henderson has a passion for working with his hands, mostly in woodwork and engineering metal work. He plays piano, organ and recorder, especially the music of J S Bach, reads English literature and a wide range of technical books, and enjoys gardening and building. He has taught music in Darjeeling, been an indoor plant decorator, a self-employed cabinet maker and biotechnology adviser to Andry Montgomery Ltd, which mounts trade exhibitions."

He is married to Anita Whiting, with whom he has two daughters and a son.

Church of Ireland titles
Preceded by John Robert Winder Neill	Bishop of Tuam, Killala, and Achonry; 1998–2011	Succeeded by Patrick William Rooke
