= Charles Bernard (bishop) =

Irish Anglican Bishop

Charles Brodrick Bernard (4 January 1811 – 31 January 1890) was an Irish Anglican bishop.

Bernard was born at Connaught Place, London, the younger son of James Bernard, 2nd Earl of Bandon, by Mary Susan Albinia Brodrick, daughter of the Right Reverend Charles Brodrick, Archbishop of Cashel. Francis Bernard, 3rd Earl of Bandon, was his elder brother. He was educated at Balliol College, Oxford, and appointed the 56th Bishop of Tuam, 55th Bishop of Killala and 56th of Achonry in 1867. He died in post on 31 January 1890 at the episcopal palace at Tuam.

Bernard married the Honourable Jane Grace Dorothea Evans-Freke, sister of George Evans-Freke, 7th Baron Carbery, in 1843. He was the father of Percy Bernard and great-grandfather of Percy Bernard, 5th Earl of Bandon, upon whose death the earldom became extinct.

Religious titles
Preceded by The Lord Plunket	Bishop of Tuam, Killala and Achonry; 1867 – 1890	Succeeded by James O'Sullivan
