= St Patrick's Cathedral, Killala =

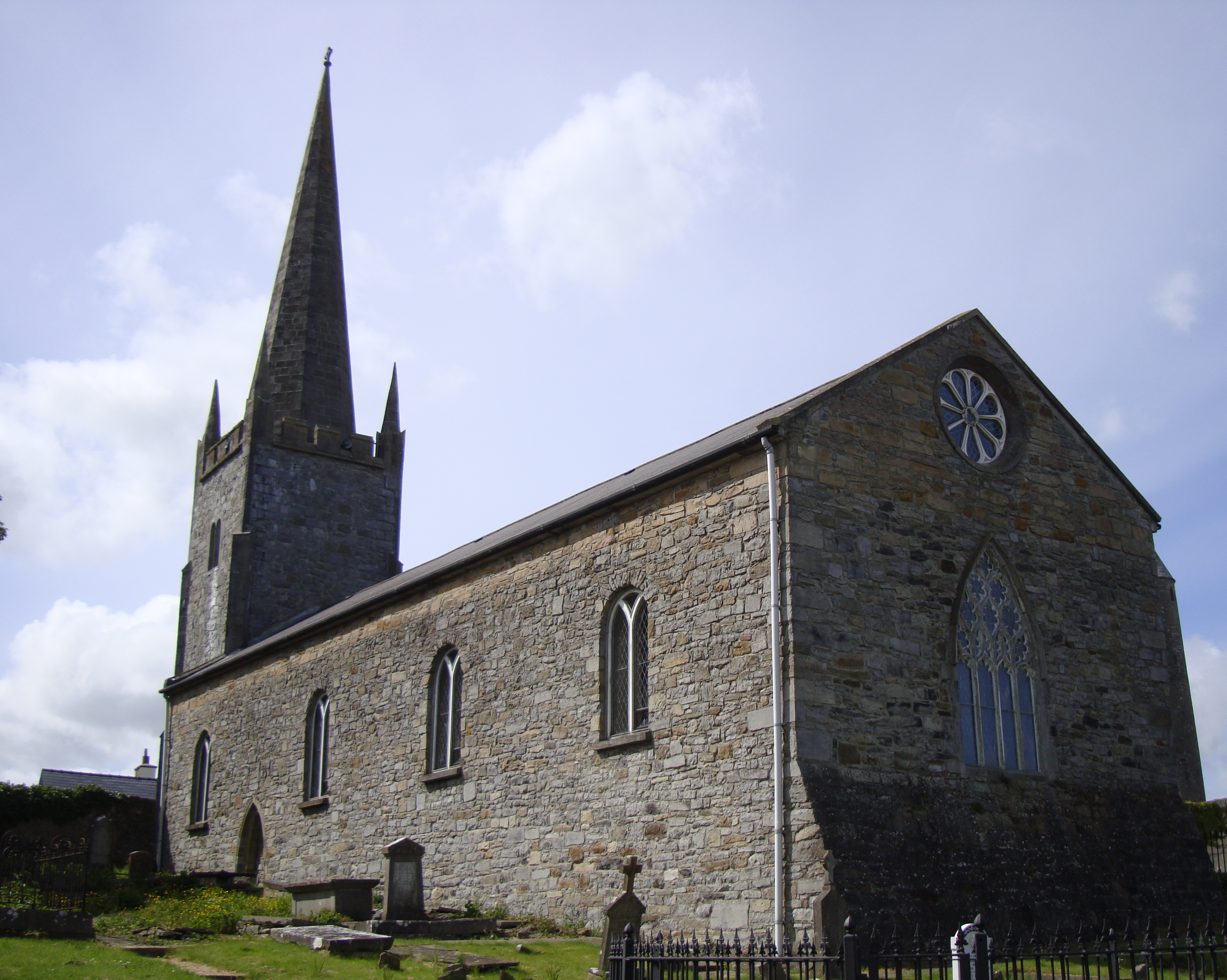
- St Patrick's Cathedral, Killala
- St Patrick's Cathedral, Killala
- 54°12′44″N 9°13′13″W
- Location: Killala, Co Mayo
- Country: Ireland
- Denomination: Church of Ireland
- Website: Killala Cathedral

Administration
- Province: Dublin
- Diocese: Tuam, Limerick and Killaloe

Clergy
- Bishop: Michael Burrows

St Patrick's Cathedral, Killala, is one of five cathedral churches (another is St Mary's Cathedral, Tuam) in the Diocese of Tuam, Limerick and Killaloe of the Church of Ireland. It is situated on the Ballina to Ballycastle road in the small coastal village of Killala, County Mayo, Ireland. It is part of the ecclesiastical province of Dublin.

The Cathedral Church of St Patrick is one of Ireland's smallest cathedrals and consists of a long rectangular four-bay gable-ended nave (32 m x 10 m) with a square tower and spire at the west end and a gable-ended vestry at the north end. A staircase leads to a gallery in the nave. The nave is fitted with boxed pews and a rare Telford organ dating from 1838.

The graveyard contains a 9th-century souterrain with several chambers.

== History ==
"The Episcopal See of Killala appears to have been founded between the years 434 and 441 by St. Patrick, who, during that period, was propagating the faith of Christianity in the province of Connaught; and built a church at this place, called Kill-Aladh, over which he placed one of his disciples, St. Muredach, as bishop." (Samuel Lewis, writing in his 1837 Topographical Dictionary).

The Diocese of Killala was established at the Synod of Ráth Breasail in 1111. The medieval cathedral was probably destroyed in the troubles of the 16th century. It was certainly in ruins by 1611.

The present building was constructed in the 1670s, during the episcopate of Thomas Otway, Bishop of Killala and Achonry, using the rubble and stone from the medieval cathedral. The tower and spire and the vestry were added to the building in 1817 by the architect James Paine. Extensive restoration of nave and chancel walls and windows was carried out in the early 1990s and plans are now in hand to restore the organ soundboard.

== See also ==
- Dean of Killala
- List of cathedrals in Ireland
