= Aghade =

Coordinates: 52°45′27″N 6°43′32″W

Aghade Áth Fhád
- Civil parish
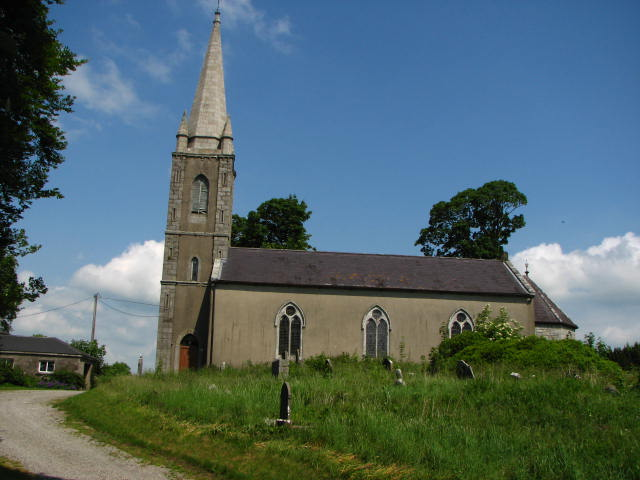
- All Saints Church

- Location within Ireland
- Country: Ireland
- County: County Carlow
- Barony: Forth

Aghade (Irish: Áth Fhád) is a civil parish and townland, in the barony of Forth in County Carlow, Ireland. It is 3 miles from Tullow and has a notable bridge over the River Slaney. It also has a church, and at one time had a school.

== History and mythology ==
=== Name ===
Aghade (or Áth Fhád in Irish, meaning "long ford") was historically, as the name indicates, a "ford" or crossing place of the river Slaney. In early times an important road or "pass" from Dublin to Wexford ran through Baltinglasss, Tullow and Enniscorthy.

=== Book of Ballymote ===
In "The Book of Ballymote" it is told how Eochaidh, the son of Enna Cennsealach, killed the poet of Niall of the Nine Hostages. Niall, the High-King, pursued Eochaidh into Leinster, laid waste the province and forced the Leinstermen to surrender Eochaidh to him. He then carried off his prisoners to Ath Fadhat on the banks of the Slaney and there he left him with a chain around his neck secured to a stone. As Niall retreated northward, nine of his champions returned to put an end to Eochaidh. When the latter saw them coming the ‘legend’ has it that he put forth all his strength, gave a sudden jerk by which he broke the chain and, seizing an iron bar to which it was secured, attacked and slew his champions. Encouraged by this feat the Leinstermen rallied, attacked Niall's army, defeated it and pursued it as far as Tullow slaughtering the retreating troops all the way. In modern times, human bones and skeletons as well as mangled pieces of swords and other military equipment have been dug up from Aghade to Tullow.

=== Christian origins of Aghade and All Saints ===
In the fifth century Saint Iserninus, Saint Patrick's nephew, resided in and was buried at Aghade. It is argued that Iserninus in close consultation with St. Patrick founded the church here. ‘The Carlow O.S. Letters’ states an abbey for nuns of the Order of St. Augustine was founded by Dermot McMorogh, King of Leinster, in 1151. He appointed it to be a sub abbey of the nunnery of St. Mary de Hoggis in Dublin. It appears that in the reign of Henry VI (1422 – 1461) 60 acres of land in Ardristian as well as the rectory of Aghade belonged to this Abbey or rather to the head house of that order in Dublin city. The present day church occupies the same site of the former convent.

== Architectural history ==
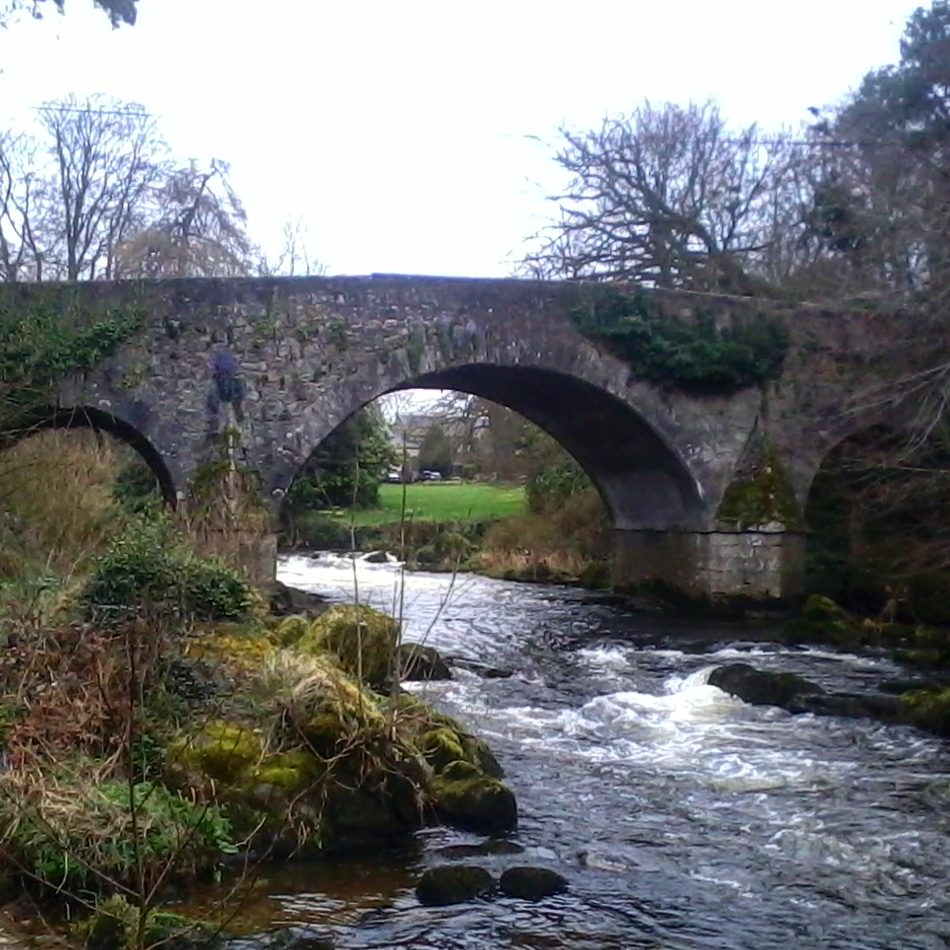
Aghade bridge

All Saints Church of Ireland Church in Aghade is a three-bay church which was built in the late 18th century and renovated in the early 19th century.

Aghade Bridge is a five-arch granite bridge which was built circa 1760 and renovated after 1825.
