= Archdeacon of Derry =

Senior ecclesiastical officer in the Diocese of Derry and Raphoe

The Archdeacon of Derry is a senior ecclesiastical officer within the Diocese of Derry and Raphoe.

The archdeaconry can trace its history from Giolla Domhnaill O'Foramain (or Gilladowny O'Forannan), the first known incumbent, known to have held the office at some point before his death in 1179, to the current incumbent since 2026 is Robert Boyd. McBride is responsible for the disciplinary supervision of the clergy and the upkeep of diocesan property within his half of the diocese.
