= Province of Dublin (Church of Ireland) =

Ecclesiastical province of the Church of Ireland

United Provinces of Dublin and Cashel
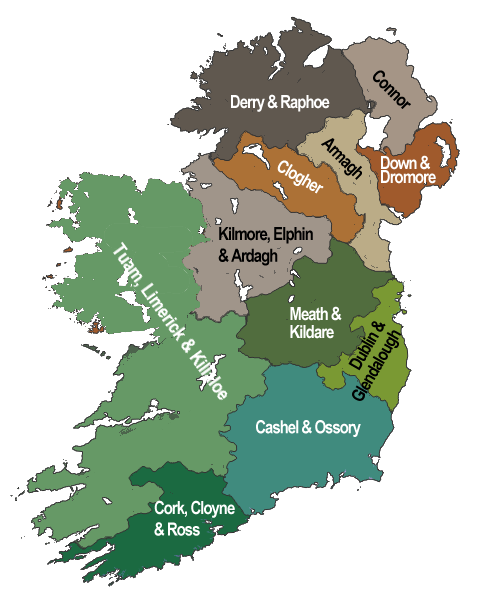
- Church: Church of Ireland
- Metropolitan bishop: Archbishop of Dublin
- Cathedral: Christ Church Cathedral, Dublin
- Dioceses: 5

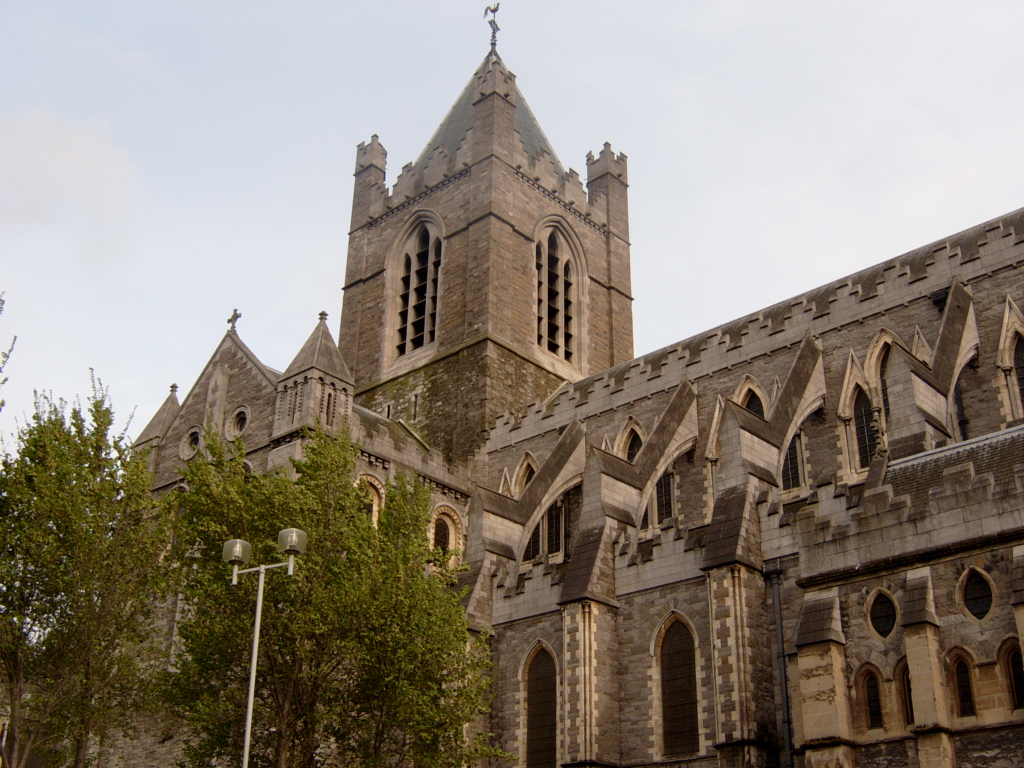
Seat at Christ Church Cathedral, Dublin.

The United Provinces of Dublin and Cashel, commonly called the Province of Dublin, and also known as the Southern Province, is one of the two ecclesiastical provinces that together form the Church of Ireland; the other is the Province of Armagh. The province has existed since 1833 when the ancient Province of Dublin was merged with the Province of Cashel. Its metropolitan bishop is the Archbishop of Dublin.

The cathedral of the United Provinces of Dublin and Cashel is the Christ Church Cathedral in Dublin. The cathedral is the elder of Dublin's two medieval cathedrals, the other being St. Patrick's Cathedral.

The National Synod of the Church of Ireland, published in 1869, includes a statement from representatives of the Provinces of Dublin and Cashel. The statement asserts the independence of the provinces:

Whereas, our provinces of Dublin and Cashel, by law and usage, are free from all subjection to the See of Armagh; and we, neither in virtue of our consecration, nor by reason of our appointment to the Archiepiscopal office in these our provinces, have bound ourselves, by the profession or promise of canonical reverence and obedience, to any other Archbishop and Metropolitical Church. By reason of which independence we do claim and assert our right of precedence, appeal, and principal jurisdiction in matters Ecclesiastical within our provinces of Dublin and Cashel.

== Dioceses in the province ==
The province has five dioceses;

- Cashel and Ossory
- Cork, Cloyne and Ross
- Dublin and Glendalough
- Meath and Kildare
- Tuam, Limerick and Killaloe

== Geographic remit ==
The province covers approximately the southern half of the island of Ireland, including the counties of Meath, Westmeath, Dublin, Kildare, Offaly, Laois, Wicklow, Wexford, Carlow, Kilkenny, Tipperary, Waterford, Cork, Kerry, Limerick, Clare, Mayo, Galway and part of Sligo.

== See also ==
- List of Anglican dioceses in the United Kingdom and Ireland
