= William Hardy Holmes =

Irish Anglican bishop

William Hardy Holmes was an Anglican bishop.

Born on 25 June 1873 and educated at Trinity College Dublin, he was ordained in 1897, and began his career with a curacy at Christ Church, Derry. He then held incumbencies at Kilbarron and Ballyshannon. In 1916 he became Archdeacon of Raphoe and in 1921 of Derry. Raised to the episcopate in 1932 as Bishop of Tuam he was translated to Meath in 1938. He died on 26 May 1951.
