= Archbishop of Dublin (Church of Ireland) =

Church of Ireland cleric

- Archbishopric

anglican
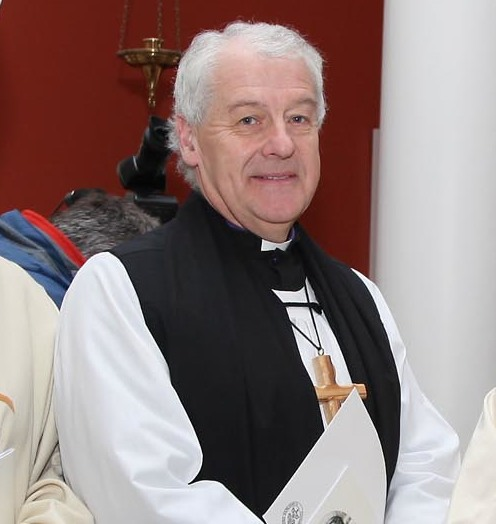
- Incumbent: Michael Jackson since 8 May 2011
- Style: His Grace, The Most Rev'd

Location
- Ecclesiastical province: Dublin

Information
- First holder: Hugh Curwen
- Established: 1535
- Diocese: Dublin and Glendalough
- Cathedral: Christchurch Cathedral, Dublin

Website
- Archbishop of Dublin

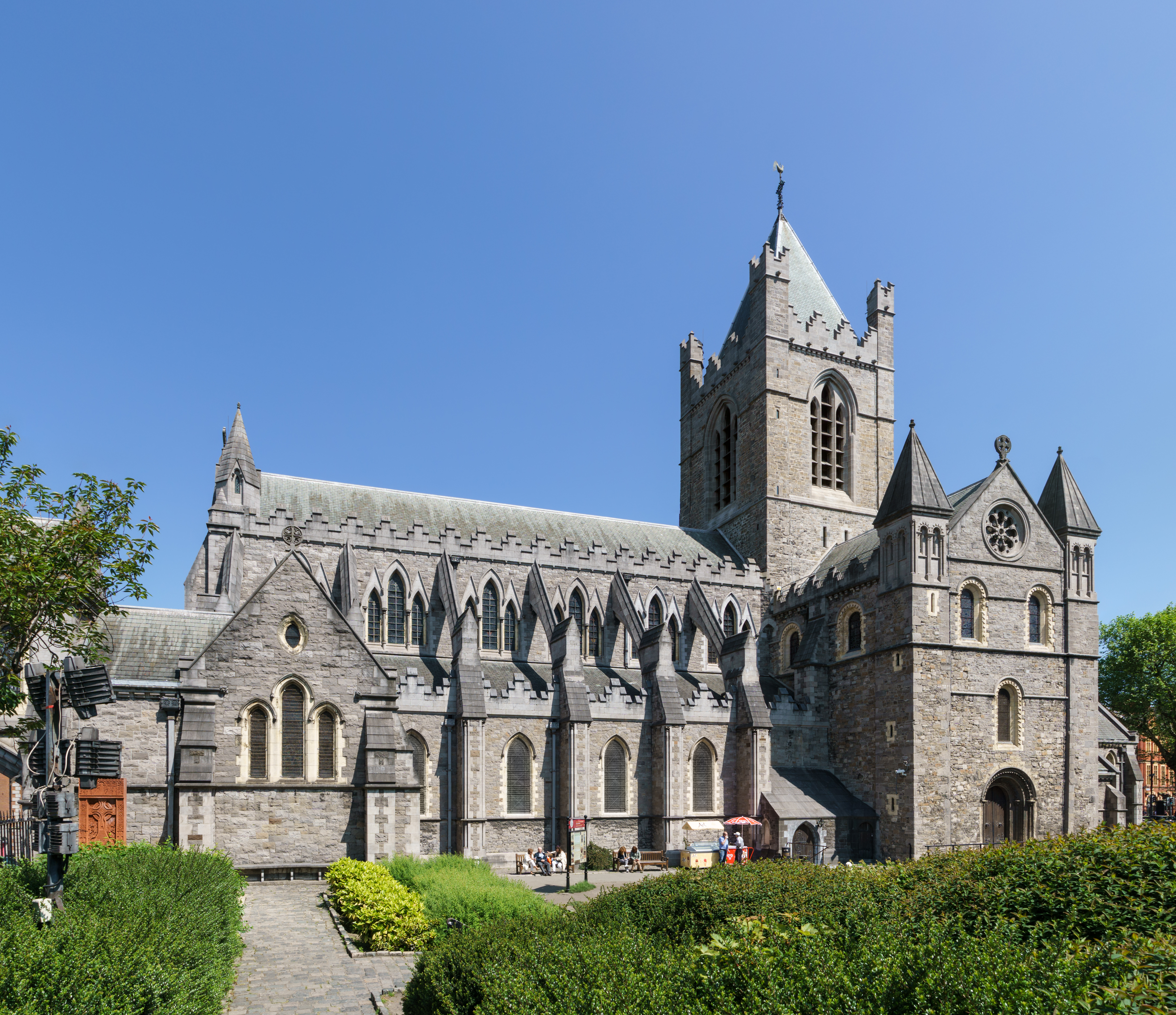
Christ Church Cathedral, Dublin, the episcopal seat of the pre-Reformation and Church of Ireland archbishops.

The Archbishop of Dublin is a senior bishop in the Church of Ireland, second only to the Archbishop of Armagh. The archbishop is the diocesan bishop of the United Dioceses of Dublin and Glendalough and the metropolitan bishop of the Province of Dublin, which covers the southern half of Ireland, and he is styled Primate of Ireland (the Archbishop of Armagh is the "Primate of All Ireland").

The archbishop's throne (cathedra) is in Christ Church Cathedral in central Dublin. The incumbent, from 11 May 2011, is Michael Jackson who signs as +Michael DUBLIN.

== History ==
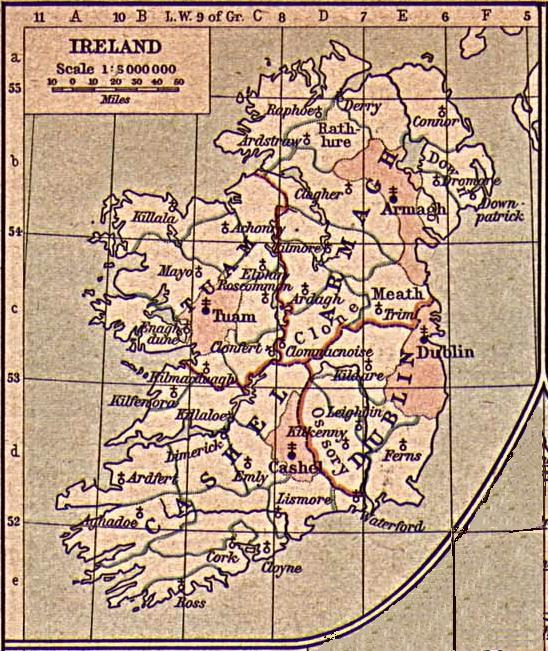
Maps of dioceses in Ireland as defined by the synod of Kells. From Historical Atlas by William R. Shepherd.

The Dublin area was Christian long before Dublin had a distinct diocese. The remains and memory of monasteries famous before that time, at Finglas, Glasnevin, Glendalough, Kilnamanagh, Rathmichael, Swords, Tallaght, among others, are witness to the faith of earlier generations and to a flourishing Church life in their time. Following a reverted conversion by one Norse King of Dublin, Sitric, his son Godfrey became Christian in 943 and the Kingdom of Dublin first sought to have a bishop of their own in the 11th century under Sitric MacAulaf, who had been on pilgrimage to Rome. He sent his chosen candidate, Donat (or Donagh or Donatus), to be consecrated in Canterbury in 1038 and the new prelate set up the Diocese of Dublin as a small territory within the walled city. The Bishop of Dublin answered to the Archbishop of Canterbury and did not attend councils of the Irish Church. Tallaght Castle was used as an official residence from the mid-15th until the early 19th century.

The archbishop was in union with Rome until the 16th century. Following the death of John Alen, Henry VIII put pressure on the chapters of Dublin's cathedrals, who elected (January 1536) an archbishop of his choice, George Browne. Browne was consecrated by Thomas Cranmer, Archbishop of Canterbury, at Lambeth.

The Diocese of Kildare was united to Archdiocese of Dublin in 1846. Prior to the disestablishment of the Church of Ireland in 1871, the Church of Ireland Archbishop of Dublin was entitled to sit in the House of Lords as a Lord Spiritual, along with the other archbishops in rotation. In 1976, the Diocese of Kildare was removed from union with Dublin and placed in union with Diocese of Meath. See Primate of Ireland for a discussion of the roles and status of the archbishops of Dublin and Armagh and their functions as primates.

== Cathedrals ==
Since the Middle Ages, the seat of the archbishop of Dublin has been Christ Church Cathedral, Dublin, although for many centuries, it shared this status with St. Patrick's Cathedral. See those articles for details of the role of the archbishop with respect to each.

== See also ==
- Archbishop of Dublin, which lists of pre- and post-Reformation archbishops

== Sources ==
- New York, 1909: The Catholic Encyclopedia; Robert Appleton Company
