= John Walker (1769–1833) =

John Walker (1769–1833) was a Church of Ireland cleric and academic of evangelical and Calvinist views. He seceded, as founder of a sect calling itself the Church of God, sometimes known as the Walkerites.

== Early life ==
Born in County Roscommon, or in Silvermines, County Tipperary, he was the son of Matthew Walker, a clergyman of the established Church of Ireland. He entered Trinity College, Dublin, on 18 January 1785, was chosen a scholar in 1788, graduated B.A. in 1790, and proceeded M.A. in 1796, and B.D. in 1800.

Walker was ordained a priest of the Church of Ireland in 1791, and then was elected a fellow of Trinity College.

== Evangelical ==
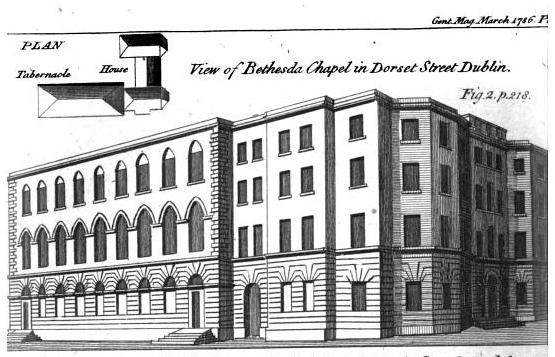
The Bethesda Chapel, Dublin, 1786 engraving

In 1791 Walker was asked by the Countess of Huntingdon's Connexion to act as tutor to William Henry, originally from Sligo. He was later a missionary on Tahiti.

At the Bethesda Chapel, Dublin, a centre for evangelicals, Walker was a chaplain from 1794 to 1804. It had been founded in 1786 by William Smyth, nephew of Archbishop William Smyth, a wealthy Dublin merchant and follower of William Romaine, and was attached to a female orphanage. Two previous chaplains, Edward Smyth who was brother to the founder and William Mann, had moved on, to Manchester and London respectively; Walker had as colleague Henry Maturin. Smyth was a Church of Ireland priest who had been expelled from his church as a reputed Methodist: he associated with John Wesley.

William Smyth passed control of the Chapel in 1794 to a group of five trustees, including Walker and Maturin. Robert Fowler, the Church of Ireland Archbishop, objected, and took steps affecting three of the trustees, the third being Thomas Kelly. He inhibited a group of five priests, including Maturin and Walker, from preaching in church, and they gravitated towards the Chapel. Walker in 1794 added the Locks Penitentiary, intended to provide work for females released from the Lock Hospital.

From this time the Chapel took on a more Calvinist tone, and encountered hostility from the Church of Ireland hierarchy. It drew in Trinity College students, and so recruited the evangelical ranks, and the congregation was influential. Arthur Guinness II, an evangelical Christian, was one of them. In 1798 Maturin took the living of Clondavaddog, after the murder there the previous year of the incumbent William Hamilton, and Walker became the sole chaplain.

During the 1790s Walker also took part in revivalist activity in the County Armagh townlands, where Thomas Campbell was minister at Aghory, preaching at Richhill, as did Rowland Hill and James Haldane

== Seceder ==
Walker began to study the principles of Christian fellowship of the earliest Christians. Convinced that later departures were erroneous, he joined with a few others in an attempt to return to apostolic practices. Their doctrinal beliefs were Calvinist, and they rejected the idea of a clerical order. On 8 October 1804 Walker, convinced that he could no longer exercise the functions of a clergyman of the Church of Ireland, informed the provost of Trinity College, and offered to resign his fellowship. He was expelled the next day. At the Bethesda Chapel, the trustee Benjamin Williams Mathias became Walker's successor as chaplain, holding the post to 1835.

With a congregation of fellow-believers in Stafford Street, Dublin, Walker supported himself by lecturing on subjects of university study. After several visits to Scotland, he moved to London in 1819.

In 1833 Trinity College granted Walker a pension of £600. He returned to Dublin, and died on 25 October that year. He was married, and had a daughter Mary.

== Church of God ==
Walker's gathered congregations amounted to about a dozen. His followers styled themselves "the Church of God",’ but were more usually known as "Separatists", and occasionally as "Walkerites". Walker taught separation from the world, apostolic authenticity, and opposition to established religion. He was uncompromising in theological controversy. A report of a conference with the Kellyites, founded by his friend Thomas Kelly, avers that it broke up on Walker's contention that "John Wesley is in hell".

== Works ==
Walker was a scholar, and wrote educational works. His publications included:

- Letters to Alexander Knox, Dublin, 1803.
- An Expostulatory Address to Members of the Methodist Society in Ireland, 3rd ed. Dublin, 1804.
- A Full and Plain Account of the Horatian Metres, Glasgow, 1822.
- Essays and Correspondence, ed. W. Burton, London, 1838.
- The Sabbath a Type of the Lord Jesus Christ, London, 1866.

He also edited:

- Livy's Historiarum Libri qui supersunt, Dublin, 1797–1813, 7 vols; Dublin, 1862.
- The First, Second, and Sixth Books of Euclid's Elements, Dublin, 1808; first six books with a treatise on trigonometry, London, 1827.
- Selections from Lucian, Glasgow, 1816; 9th ed. Dublin, 1856.

For the opening of the Bethesda Chapel, on 22 June 1794, Walker wrote two hymns, one of which, "Thou God of Power and God of Love", was included in later collections.
