= Spilsbury =

Spilsbury is a surname. Notable people with that surname may include:

- Albert Spilsbury (1894–1959), English footballer
- Benjamin Spilsbury (1864–1938), English footballer
- Sir Bernard Spilsbury (1877–1947), British pathologist
- George Green Spilsbury (1786–1857), British surgeon
- John Spilsbury (Baptist minister) (1593–c. 1668), English cobbler and Particular Baptist minister
- John Spilsbury (cartographer) (1739–1769), British mapmaker and engraver who invented the jigsaw puzzle
- John Spilsbury (cricketer) (born 1933), English cricketer
- Jonathan Spilsbury (c. 1737–1812), English engraver
- Klinton Spilsbury (born 1951), American actor
- Maria Spilsbury (1776–1820), British artist
- Thomas Spilsbury (1874–1947), English footballer
- Tom Spilsbury (born 1976), British writer, magazine editor and journalist
