= Maria Spilsbury =

British artist (1776–1820)

Maria Spilsbury (1776–1820) was a British artist known for her religious paintings and portraiture.

== Biography ==
Spilsbury was born at 68 Great Ormond Street, London, in 1776. She had a twin brother but he died at their birth. Her parents were Rebecca and Jonathan Spilsbury. Her younger brother was Jonathan Robert Henry Spilsbury, who was baptized on 7 December 1779 at St Marylebone, London. In 1789, her father moved the family to Ireland, working as a tutor for Mrs Sarah Tighe of Rossana, County Wicklow. They returned to London two years later, settling at 10 St. George's Row, Hyde Park.

In addition to learning art from her father (who was a friend and contemporary of Joshua Reynolds and Charles Wesley) Spilsbury was tutored in colored painting by Sir William Beecher and in music by Charles Wesley the Younger, who proclaimed her the best amateur organist in London.

Despite never having had any formal training, Spilsbury first exhibited at the Royal Academy at the age of fifteen and continued to do so throughout her life. Her paintings were also shown at the British Institution, the British School, the Royal Academy, the Hibernian Society of Artists, and the Dublin Society. She excelled in portraiture, genre painting, and morality painting. Her work is characterized by a particular interest in evangelical religious themes. Contemporary accounts suggest that her studio on St. George's Row, London, was so popular that up to twenty carriages could be seen outside it on weekly private viewing days. Her patrons included the Prince Regent, George IV, who frequented her studio.

In 1808 Spilsbury married John Taylor, a Protestant minister with a parish in Hampshire. She moved to Ireland with her husband in 1813, residing again with Mrs. Tighe in Dublin, where she remained active as a painter. Shortly thereafter, however, her sixth pregnancy resulted in a miscarriage and Spilsbury fell ill. She died in Dublin on 1 June 1820. Today, her paintings can be found in both private and public collections including those of the National Gallery of Ireland and the British Museum.

== Works ==
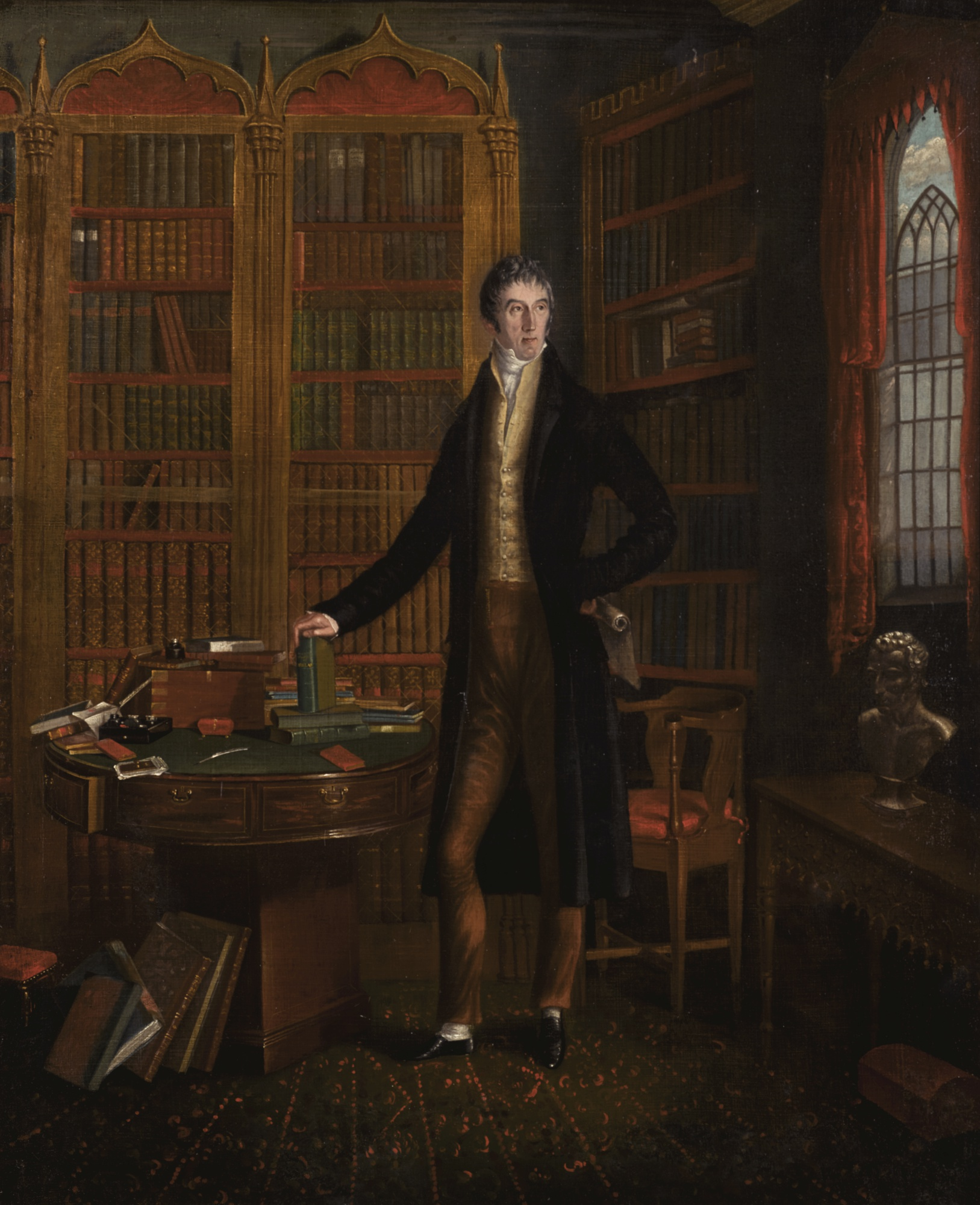
Henry Grattan MP, in a library (circa 1817)

- Miss Elizabeth Angerstein Attended by Guardian Angels (exh. RA, 1805; ex Phillips, 13 June 1997)
- The Schoolmistress (1803; Tate collection)
- Confusion, or The Nursery in the Kitchen (exh. British Institution, 1811; Williamson Art Gallery and Museum, Birkenhead)
- The House of Protection for Destitute Females of Character (exhibited at the Royal Academy, 1806 and the British Institution, 1807)
- Two Girls Applying for Admission (exh. RA, 1806 and British Institution, 1807)
- Christ Feeding the Multitude, The Second Miracle of the Loaves and Fishes—St. Matthew, xv (exh. RA, 1804)
- The Fourth of June (exh. RA, 1807 and British Institution, 1808)
- The Royal Jubilee, as Celebrated at Great Malvern, 1809 (exh. British Institution, 1811)
- John Wesley Preaching in the Open Air at Willybank, Rossana (1814/15; Museum of Methodism at Wesley's Chapel, London)
- Patron's Day at the Seven Churches, Glendalough (exh. Hawkins Street, 1816; National Gallery of Ireland, Dublin)
- Mrs. Henry Grattan (National Gallery of Ireland, Dublin)
- Alexander Hamilton and his Wife and Daughters
- Portrait of Francis Synge
- Portrait of the Reverend Benjamin Williams Mathias (1772–1841) Chaplain of Bethesda Chapel, Dublin, it was later engraved by Charles Turner (1774–1857).
- Portrait of the Rev. William Kingsbury was engraved by Henry Edward Dawe.
- Pattern at Glendalough (National Folklore Collection, UCD Dublin)
