= Deborah Alcock =

Irish-born author (1835–1913)

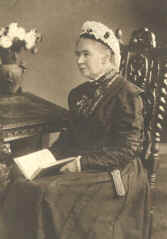
- Deborah Alcock
- Born: Deborah Alcock; 1835; Kilkenny
- Died: 15 January 1913 (aged 77–78); Hastings, St. Leonards-on-Sea
- Occupation: author
- Years active: 1857-1908
- Known for: "The Spanish Brothers" (1870)
- Parent: Venerable John Alcock Jane

Deborah Alcock (1835– 15 January 1913) was a late-Victorian author of historical fiction focused on religious, evangelical themes.

== Life ==
She was born in Kilkenny, where her father, the Venerable John Alcock, who became Archdeacon of Waterford, and his wife Jane. In the 1851 Isle of Man Census, the fifteen-year-old Deborah is recorded as living on the Isle of Man with her parents, aunt Sally McKenny, cousins nineteen-year-old Deborah Barllie and thirteen-year-old Barbara Gose, and two servants.

Reflecting on her childhood, Alcock described having read narratives of saintly children who died young as well as stories detailing missionary outreach to unconverted heathen. However, her father discouraged fiction reading, banning the works by the likes of Elizabeth Gaskell, Charlotte Mary Yonge, Charlotte Brontë, George Eliot, or George McDonald. However, she was allowed to read novels by Sir Walter Scott, which shaped the theme and style of her writing as she grew older.

In adulthood, she lived with her father, writing a memoir of him on his death entitled Walking with God: A Memoir of the Venerable John Alcock (Hodder & Houghton, 1898), and stayed unmarried herself. In the 1891 England Census, she and a Caroline G. Cavendish listed as currently visiting an Irish friend from Cork, Martha A. Lloyd at 143 Clapham Road, Lambeth, London. In the England Census for 1901, she and her widowed cousin Mary Smith are located at Bournemouth, Dorset. In 1900, The Sunday at Home, a periodical published by the Religious Tract Society, interviewed Alcock at her home in Bournemouth, revealing her frequent bouts of illness and constant excitement about writing.

By 1911 Alcock had removed to Sussex. She lived for a while in St Leonards with the novelist Elizabeth Boyd Bayly. She died at her home 1 Bohemia Road, Hastings, St. Leonards-on-Sea and left £9,726 16 s. in her will. In 1914 Elizabeth Boyd Bayly published her biography.

== Career ==
Her tale of Protestant martyrdom, The Spanish Brothers, published in 1870, was set in the 16th century. (Note: Reissued by Nelson, London, in 1903 with illustrations by N. Tenison) Other work includes The Czar (1882), set during the French invasion of Russia; Archie’s Chances (1886), and Prisoners of Hope (1894).

== Themes ==
Her books contain episodes from the history of the Protestant church written in the form of a story. Several of these stories have been translated into Dutch, German, and French.

== Reception and legacy ==
According to Benjamin B. Warfield, writing for the Princeton Theological Review, Alcock penned powerful stories but failed to make certain of her figures like John Calvin "Christian" and "forceful" enough. Besides this yearning for more muscular Christianity in Alcock's tales, Warfield does admit, "Deborah Alcock has long been known as the author of a series of admirable stories, the scenes of which are cast in stirring periods of religious history, and the religious tone of which is not only sane and true, but especially moving. The best of them is probably The Spanish Brothers, the scene of which is cast in Reformation Spain: it has been translated into most of the European languages and has had a wide influence for good."

In the 20th and 21st centuries, Christian publishers such as Moody Publishers, Inheritance Publications, and Bible Truth have reissued her titles.

== Books ==
- The Life of Gustavus Adolphus, King of Sweden (1857)
- The Seven Churches of Asia, or, The Seven Golden Candlesticks (1860)
- Sunset in Provence (1864)
- The Dark Year of Dundee: Tale of the Scottish Reformation
- The Spanish Brothers: A Tale of the Sixteenth Century (1871)1867)
- Tales of Martyr Times (1872) [reprint of Sunset in Provence]
- In the Shadow of God (1877)
- Lessons on Early Church History (1879)
- In the Shadow of God. [Part I:] In the Desert: A Story of the Church Under the Cross (1880)
- The Czar: A Tale of the Time of the First Napoleon. (1882)
- The Roman Students; or, On the Wings of the Morning (1883)
- Archie's Chances (1886)
- The Child's Victory (1889)
- Geneviève; or, the Children of Port Royal. A story of Old France (1889)
- Crushed yet Conquering: A Story of Constance and Bohemia (1891)
- Prisoners of Hope (1894)
- By Far Euphrates; A Tale (1897)
- No Cross, No Crown: A Tale of the Scottish Reformation (1900)
- Under the Southern Cross: A Tale of the New World (1900)
- Done and Dared in Old France (1907)
- Under Calvin's Spell; or, A Tale of the heroic Times in Old Geneva (1902), republished in France as Gabrielle; histoire d'une fiancée au temps de Calvin (1908)
- The Romance of Protestantism (1908)
