= National Wax Museum Plus =

Coordinates: 53.3466°N 6.2588°W

The National Wax Museum Plus
- An Músaem Céarach Náisiúnta Plus

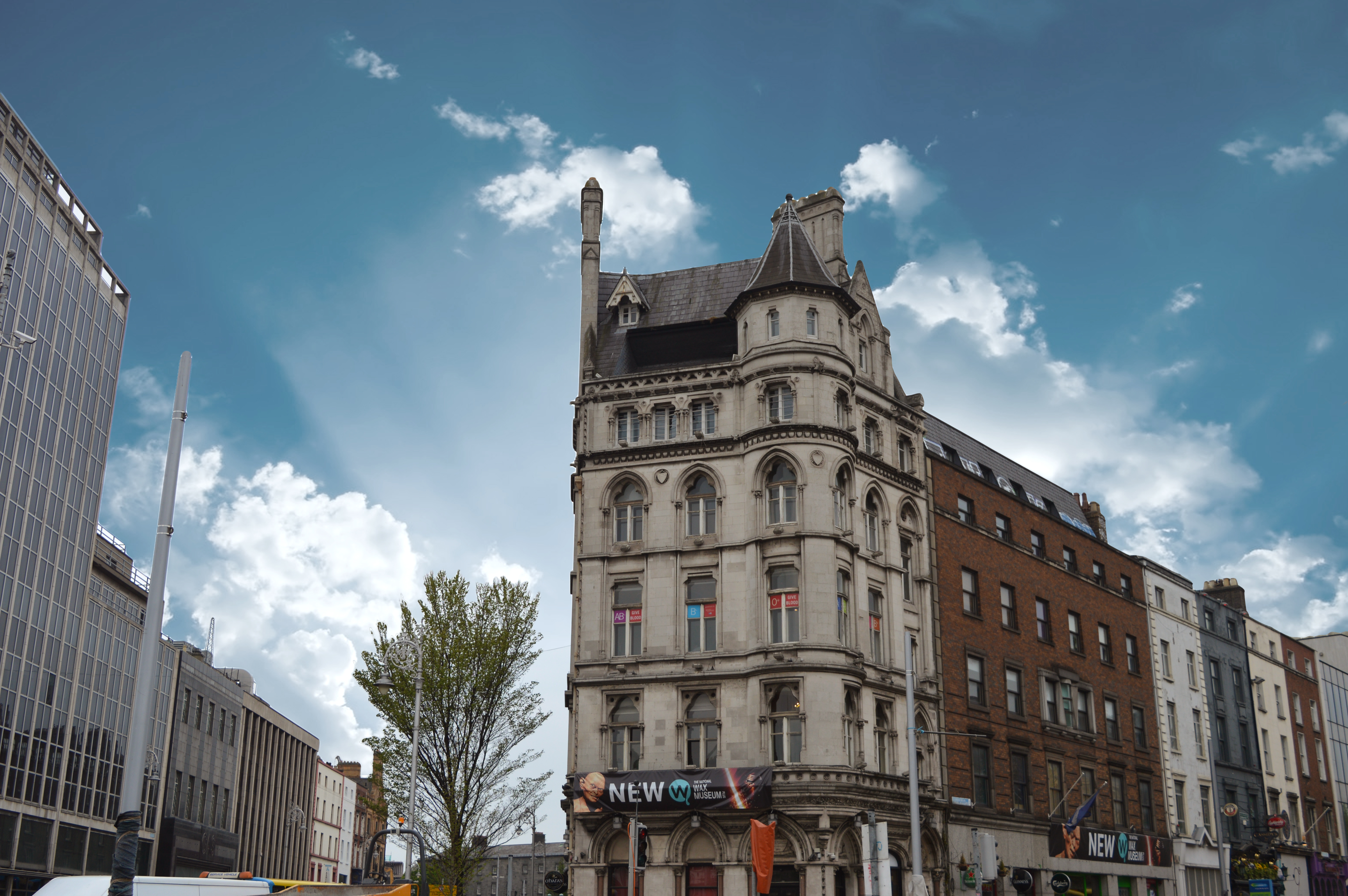
- Established: June 1983
- Location: 22-25 Westmoreland Street, Dublin, Ireland
- Type: wax museum
- Owner: Patrick Dunning
- Public transit access: Stephen's Green Luas stop (Green Line); College Green bus stops
- Parking: Park Rite Fleet Street Car Park
- Website: waxmuseumplus.ie

The National Wax Museum Plus is a waxworks in Dublin, Ireland. First opened in 1983 as the National Wax Museum, it was later relocated and renamed.

== History ==
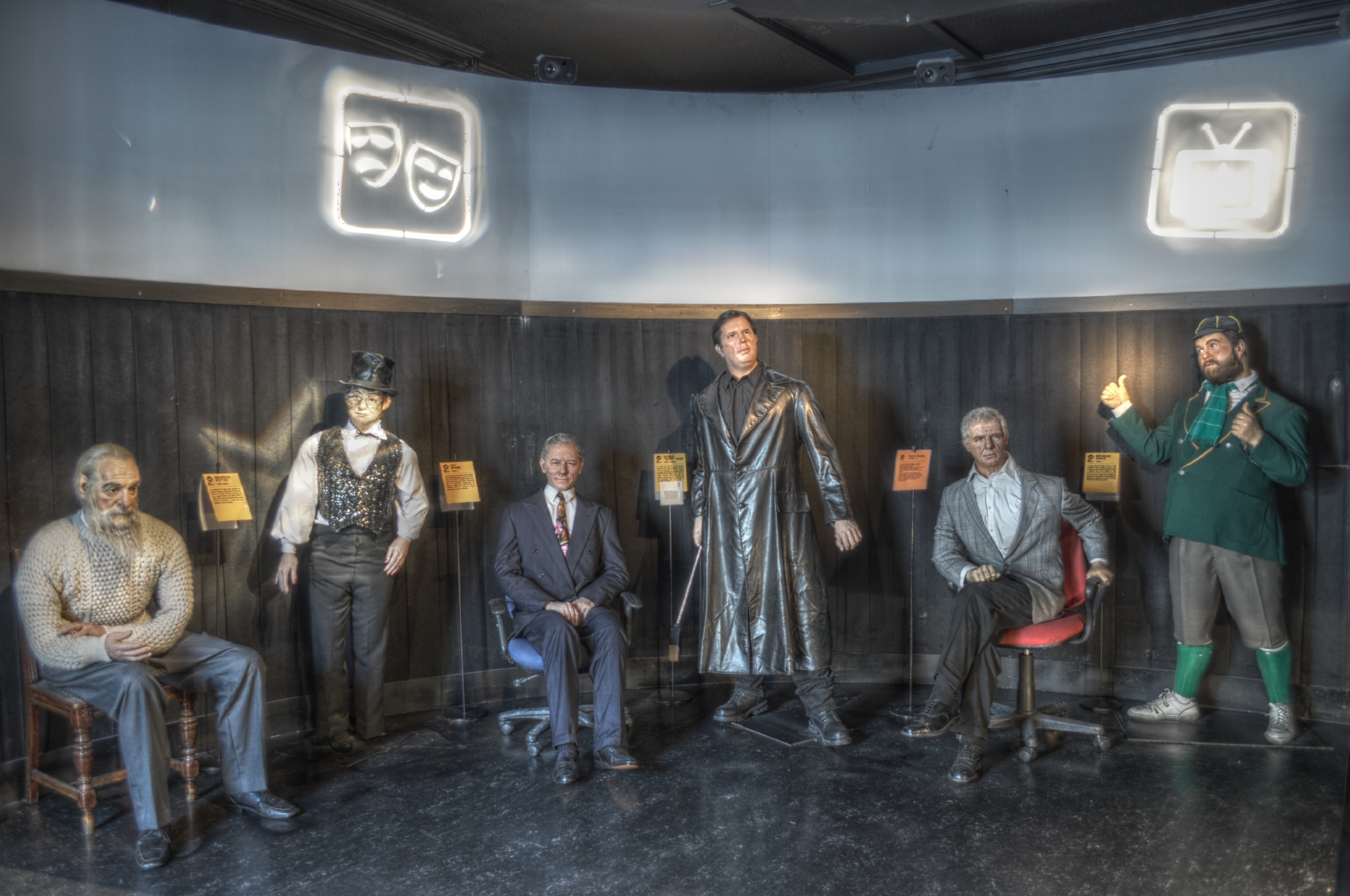
Wax figures exhibition at the museum

The National Wax Museum at it was then known was originally situated in Granby Row, Dublin 1, close to Parnell Square on the north side of the city. It was opened in 1983 by the Lord Mayor of Dublin. In the past, it was a former site to prayer rooms converted into a cinema called Plaza Cinema (and prior to that Bethesda Chapel) and then into a waxworks, but this building was demolished to make way for a hotel.

The old Wax Museum in Granby Row had closed in 2005 and the site was to be redeveloped as the Maldron Hotel Parnell Square. In 2009 the museum, which at this time had now changed its name to Wax Museum Plus, found a new location in 4 Fosters Place, Temple Bar. On December 4, 2016 The Irish Stock Exchange purchased the Foster's Place location and The Wax Museum was relocated to the Lafayette Building in the centre of Dublin, more specifically 22–25 Westmoreland Street. The museum opened its doors on 25 April 2017, with new exhibitions and a new augmented reality app.

The museum was previously owned by Donie Cassidy, a Senator and former TD. It is now owned by Music Recording entrepreneur, Patrick Dunning, owner of Grouse Lodge Studios.

== Models ==
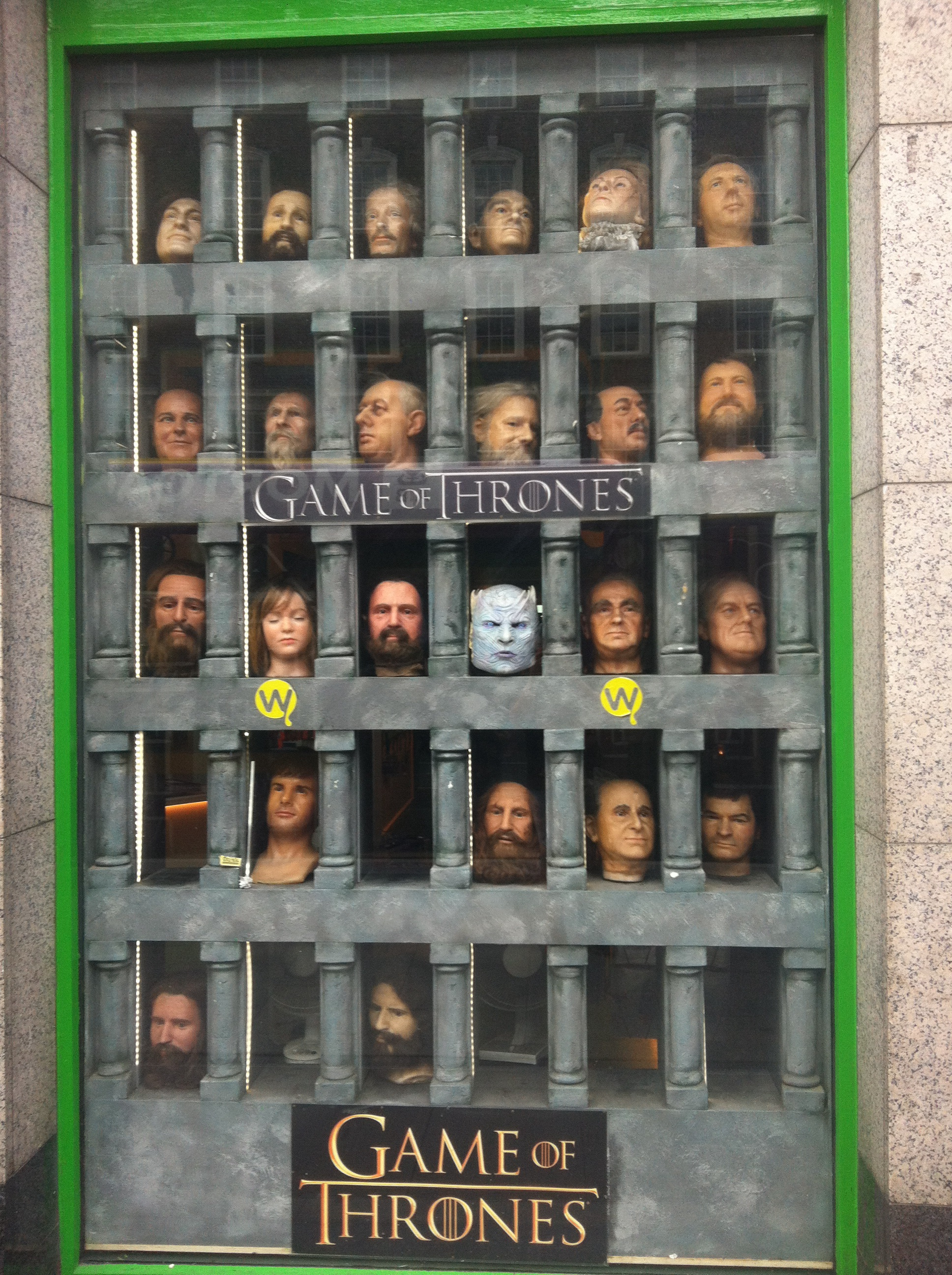
A Game of Thrones exhibit in the Wax Museum in Dublin.

In the previous Wax Museum building, there was a mixture of wax figures and various other figures that were not modelled in wax (mainly because the wax materials were not suited to such. For example: the character of The Lord of the Rings, Gollum is made from fibre glass rather than wax). This can be to do with problems relating to the figure's weight and skin tones (wax is a heavy material and also useful for a basis of realistic human skin tones) or simply on the artist's style of work.

The front of the building bore a striking mythical Irish giant. At the entrance were some figures including Gollum. The path through the museum brings visitors to a scene with figures such as Crocodile Dundee, E.T., and Irish sporting and entertainment stars. It went upstairs through a winding staircase, surrounding a jack in the beanstalk scene, complete with giant. From there, visitors entered the Children's World (with the head of the outside Giant peaking in), and witness various storybook characters, and children's television show characters. Main attractions here were tunnels in which children could crawl through, the Flintstones, the Power Rangers, and Bob the Builder.

Visitors would then move downstairs to witness a scene of the Teenage Mutant Ninja Turtles, then on to view many Irish figures of historical importance including Wolfe Tone, the 1916 Rising, and Michael Collins. Following this were various Irish presidents including Éamon de Valera, Mary McAleese, and Taoisigh. This led on towards figures of Irish theatre, writers, television presenters and G.A.A. stars. Moving from Irish figures to famous world leaders and figures such as Princess Diana, World War II leaders, modern American and Middle-Eastern and Northern Irish leaders of the Northern troubles. Then visitors could witness a re-enactment of Leonardo da Vinci's Last Supper painting in three-dimensional wax form.

As visitors went downstairs again, they passed Christopher Reeve as Superman, and see the Pope and Cardinals standing on top of the actual Popemobile from Pope John Paul II's visit to Ireland in 1979. Visitors then entered a room with the Simpsons family while a screen would play a film for people to sit down and enjoy or take a photo opportunity in a set of medieval stocks. Visitors were then given a choice to enter the Chamber of horrors (or bypass it and enter the next phase after it), with horror characters such as Dracula, Frankenstein, the Werewolf and the Mummy. Also displayed were figures like Hannibal Lecter as he rattled prison bars, the X-files alien, and Freddy Krueger, amongst others.

Visitors then entered another tunnel opportunity for children again and then onto the "Hall of Megastars" with figures like Michael Jackson, David Bowie, U2, Tina Turner, Ronan Keating, and Irish rock star Phil Lynott taking the stage. The tour then ended with entertaining scenes dedicated to Batman with Jack Nicholson as the Joker, Arnold Schwarzenegger as Mr. Freeze, and Star Wars with Liam Neeson as Qui-Gon Jinn in battle with Darth Maul as well as Yoda and young Anakin Skywalker.

== Wax figure damages ==
In June 2007, while the wax figures were in storage awaiting a new home, break-ins occurred in the warehouses. Many figures were damaged by vandals, including smashed heads. There were also a number of figures stolen including Bob the Builder as well as many army-style uniforms from scenes such as the 1916 Rising. This incident created even harder circumstances in which to try relocate the Wax Museum. The museum's head sculptor, P.J. Heraty was assigned the job of revamping and often, recreating the broken figures.

== Gallery ==
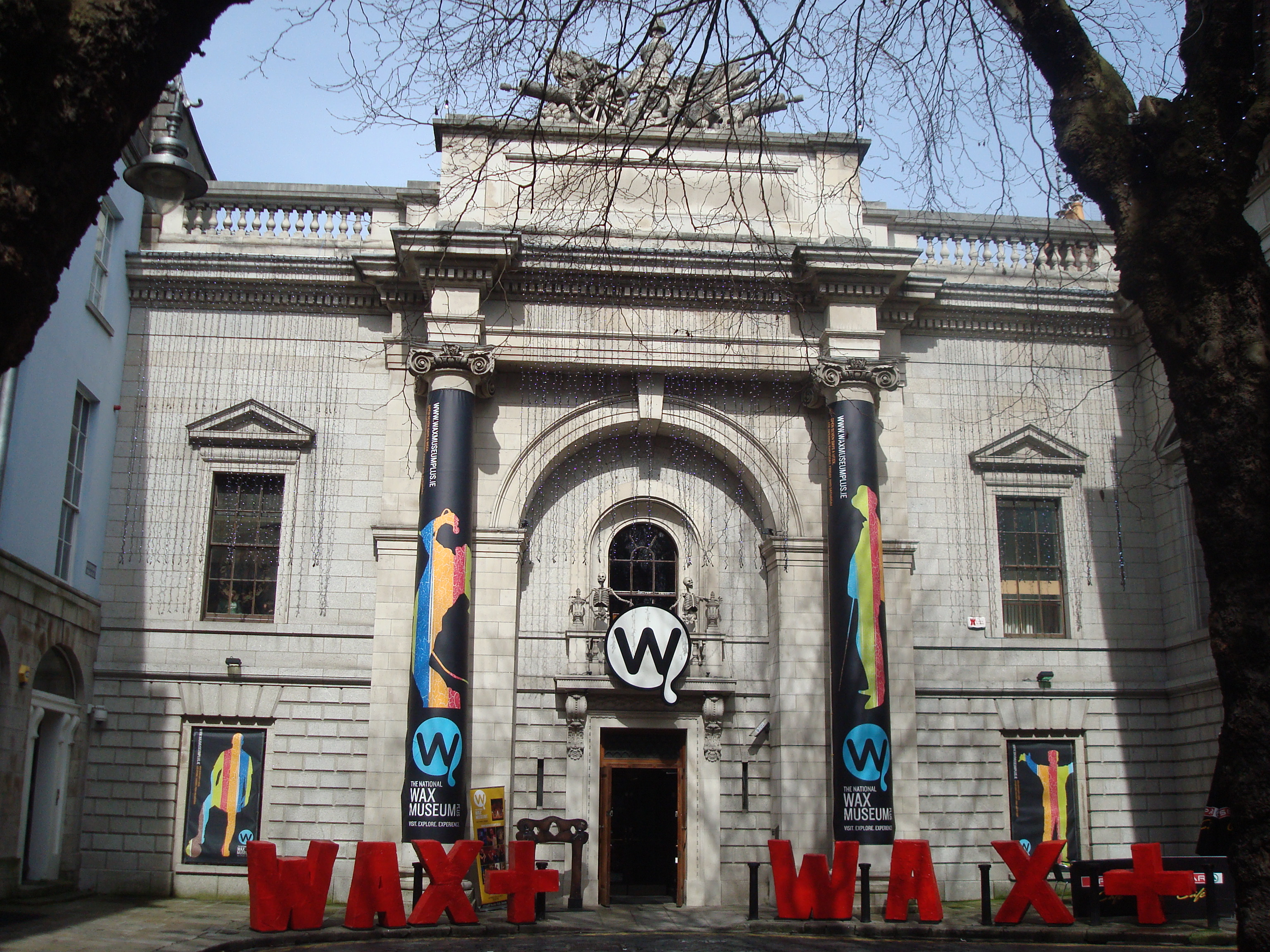
Old Foster Place location

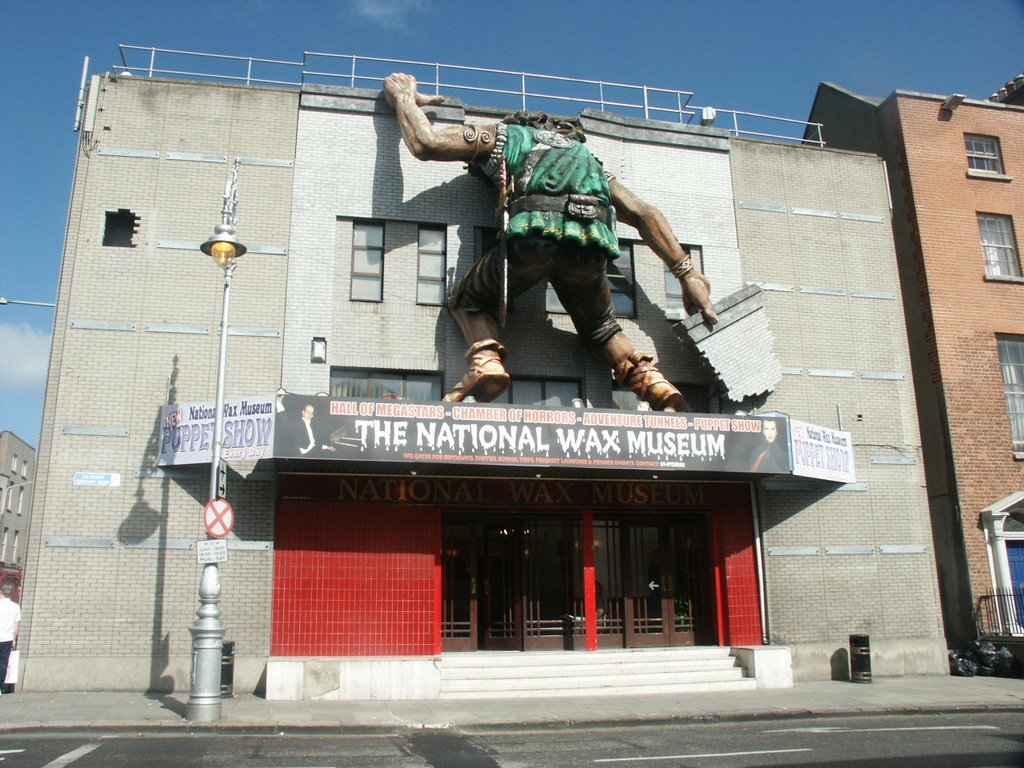
The National Wax Museum at it was then known was originally situated in Granby Row

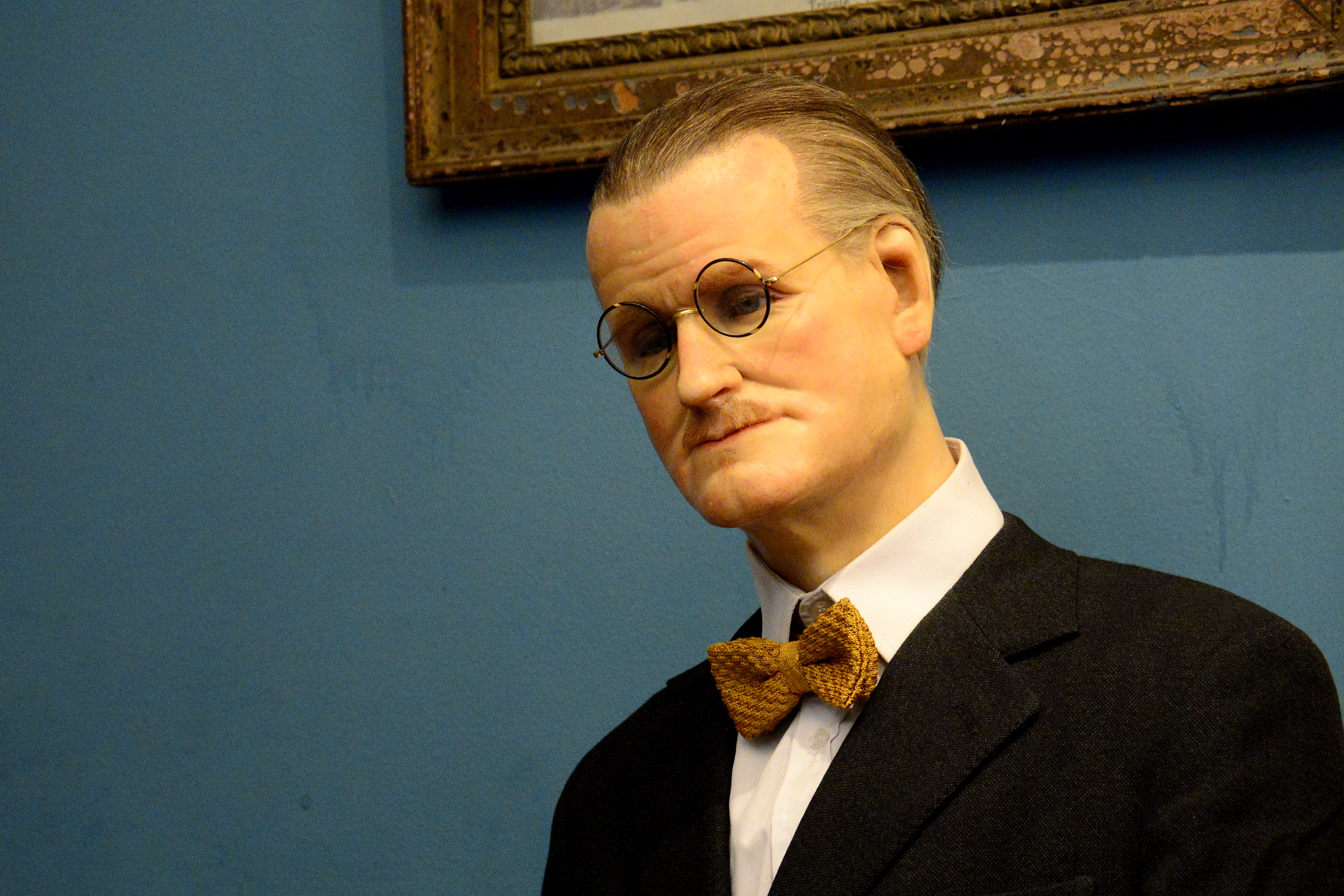
James Joyce

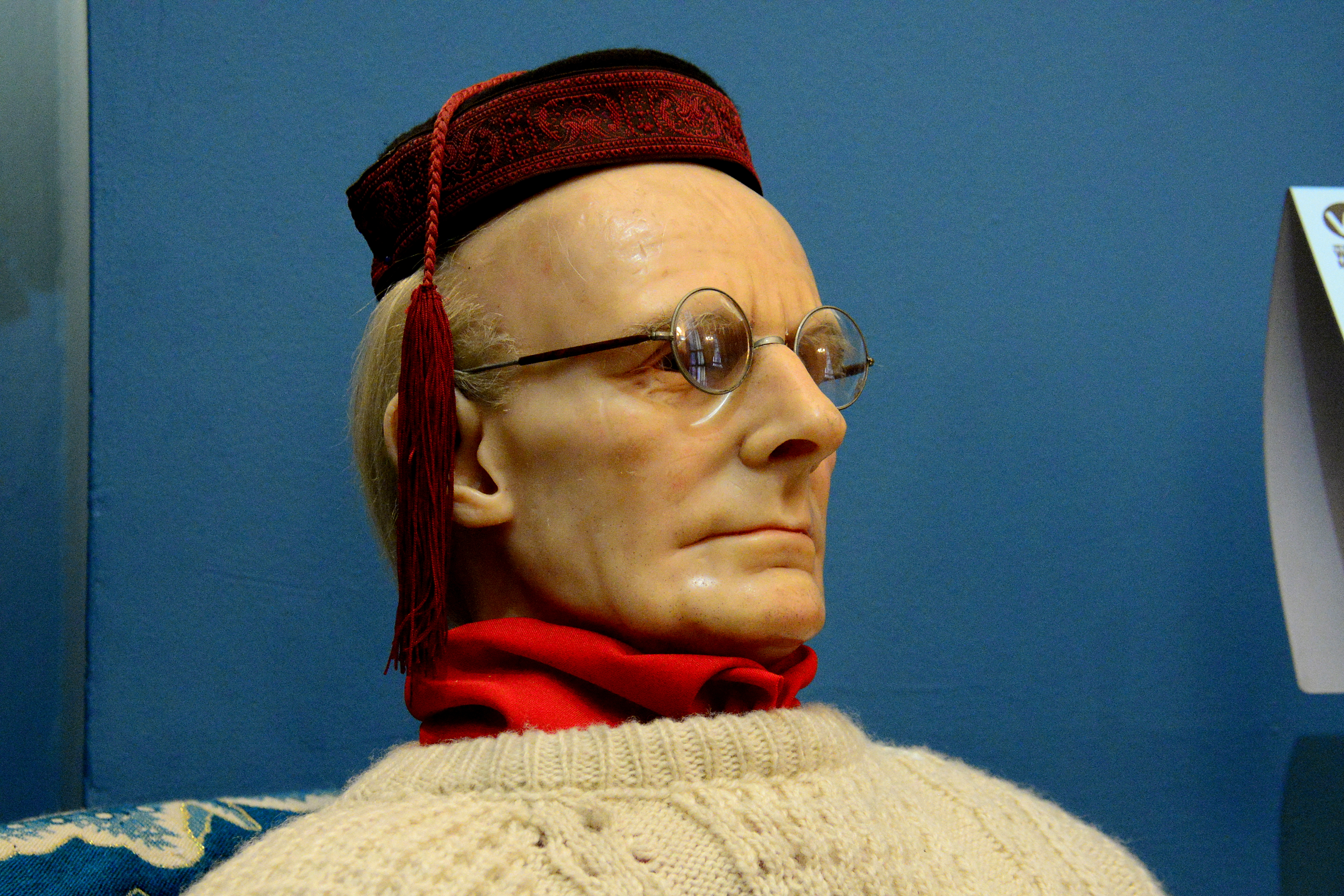
Sean O'Casey

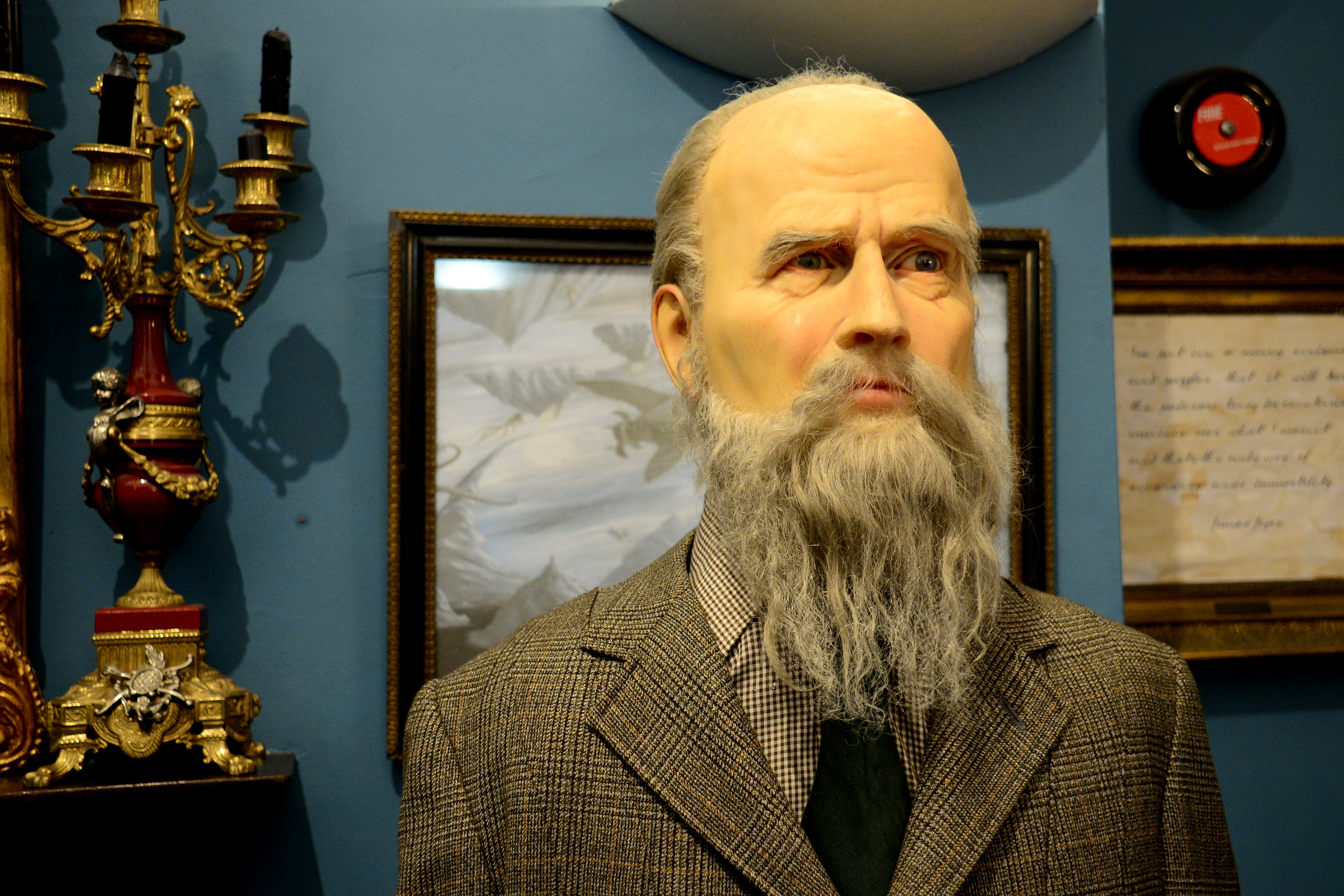
Bernard Shaw

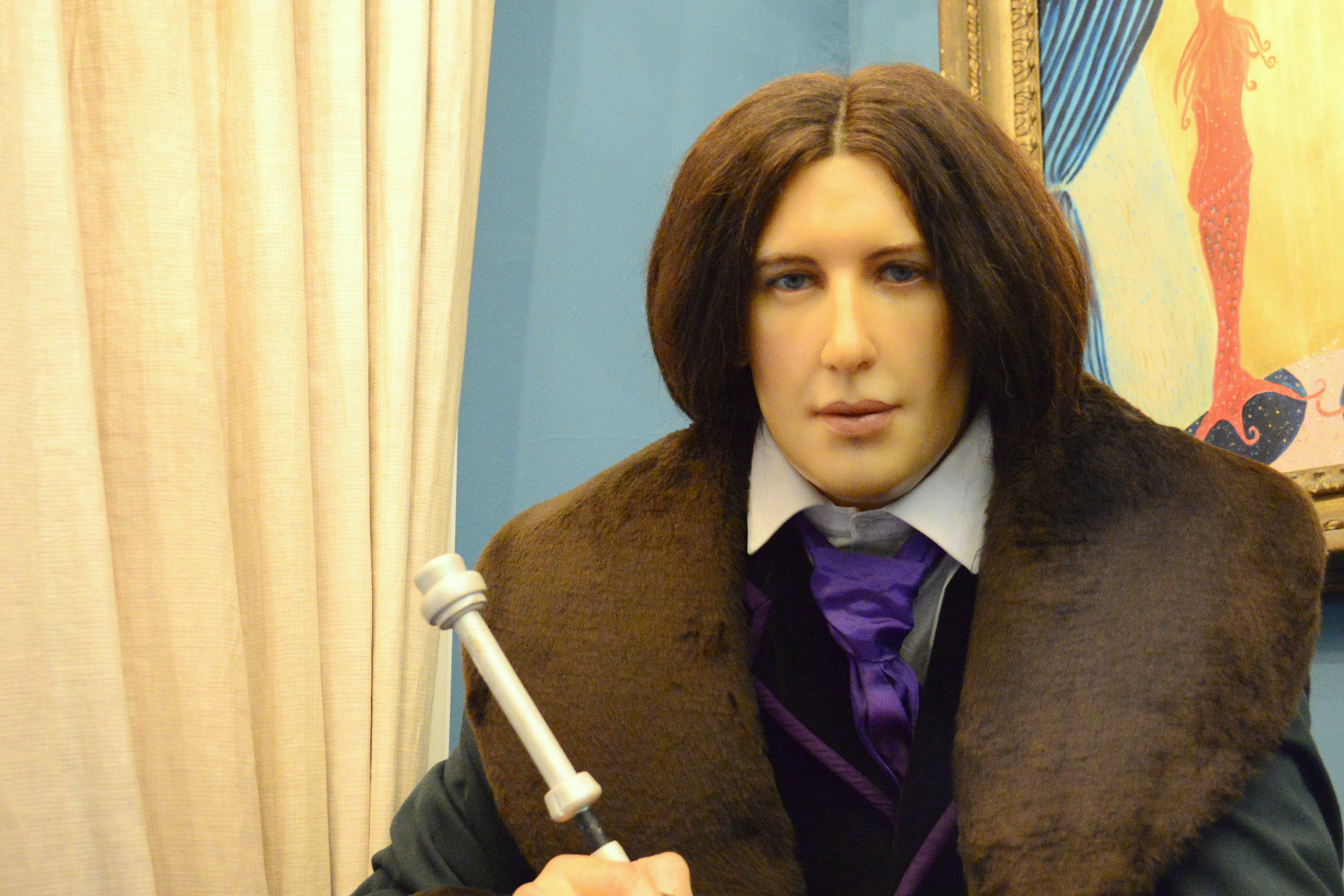
Oscar Wilde

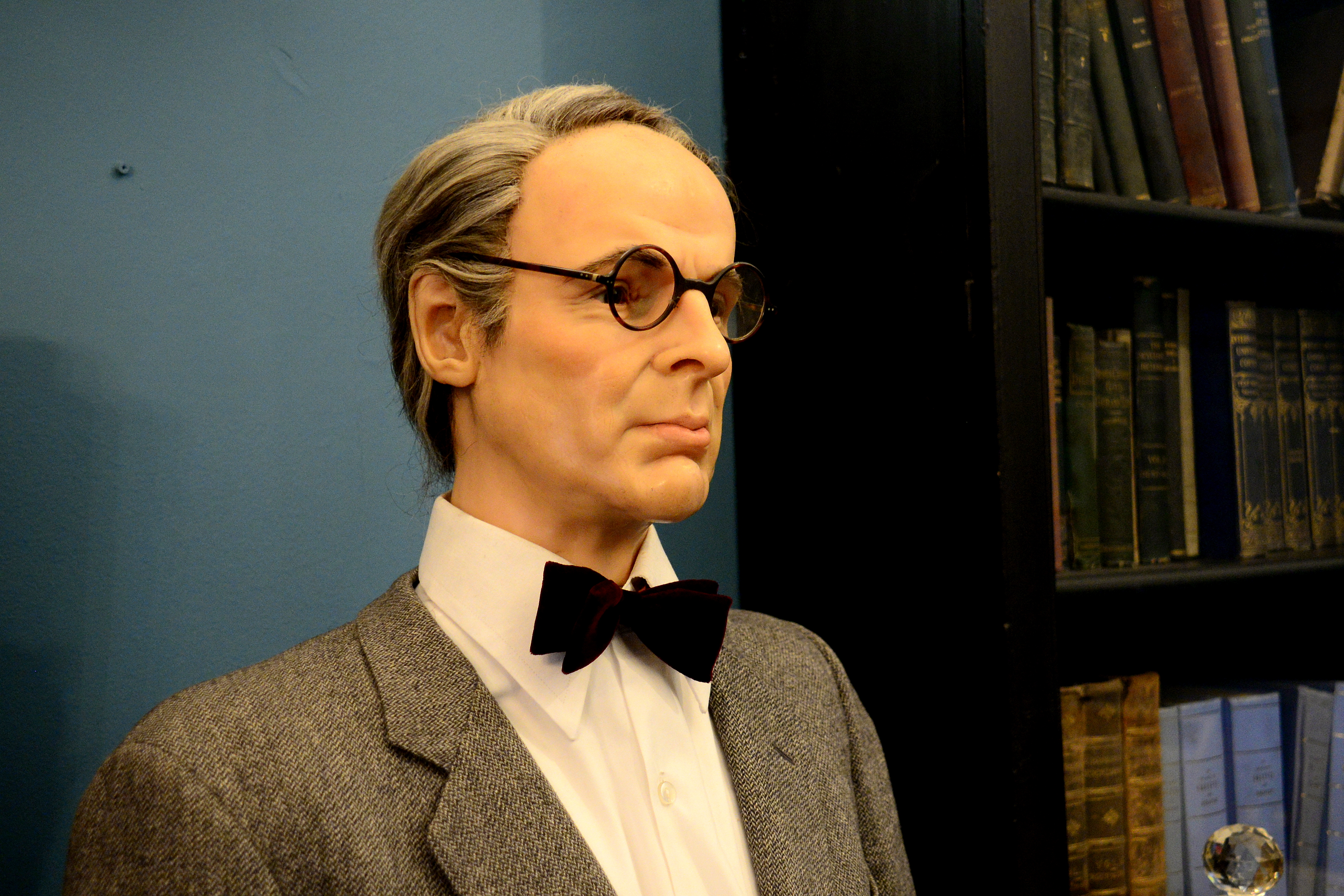
William Butler Yeats

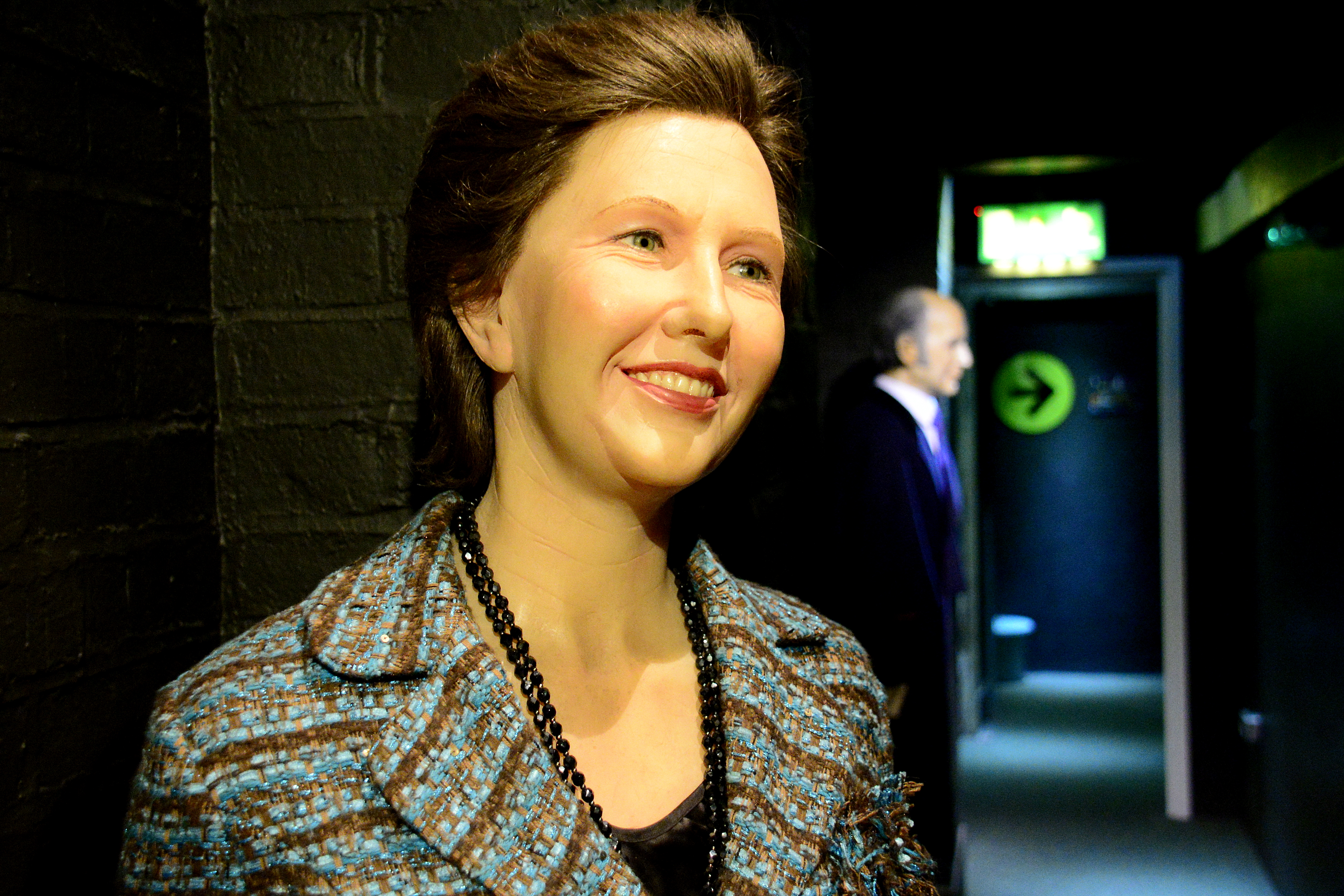
Mary McAleese

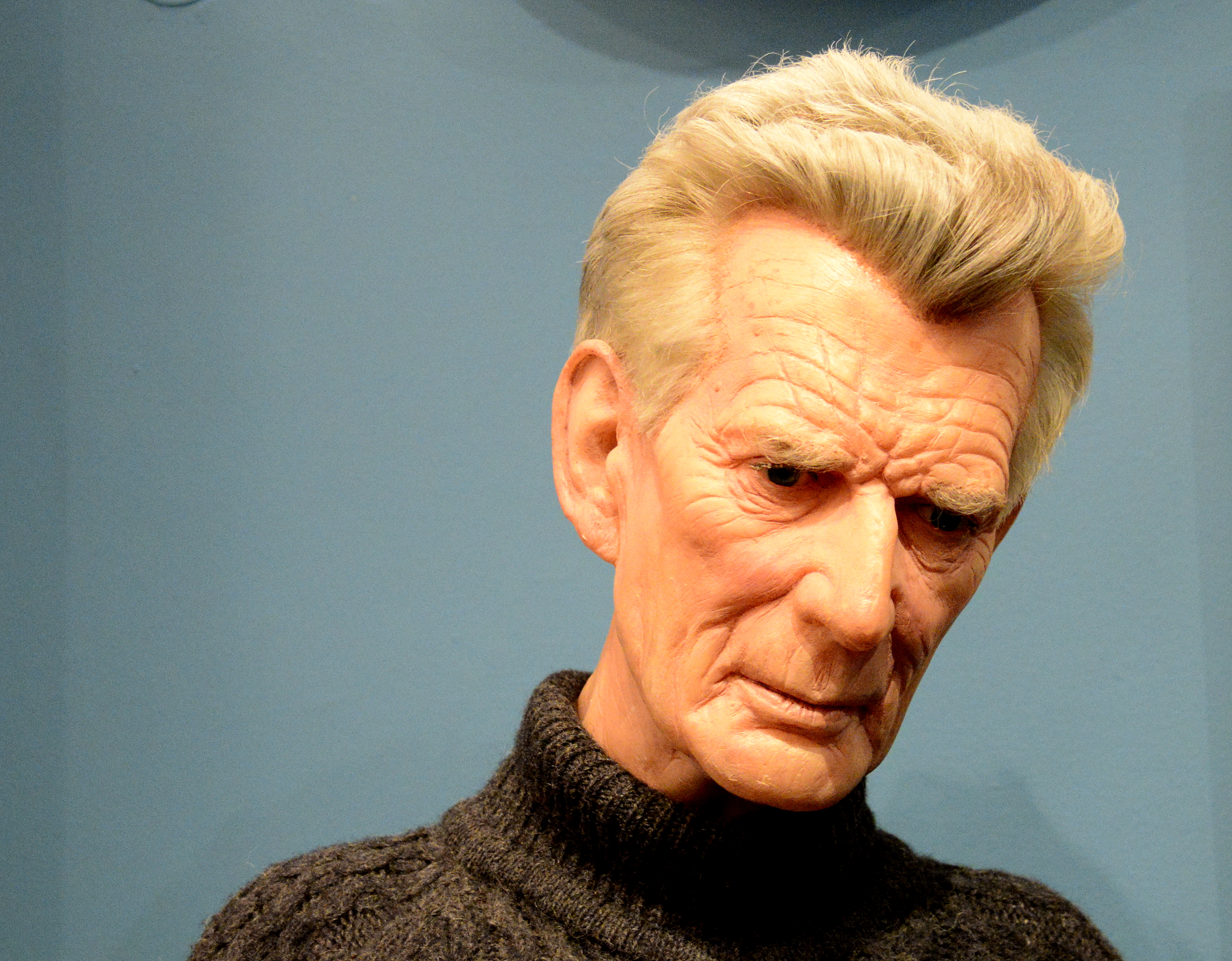
Samuel Beckett

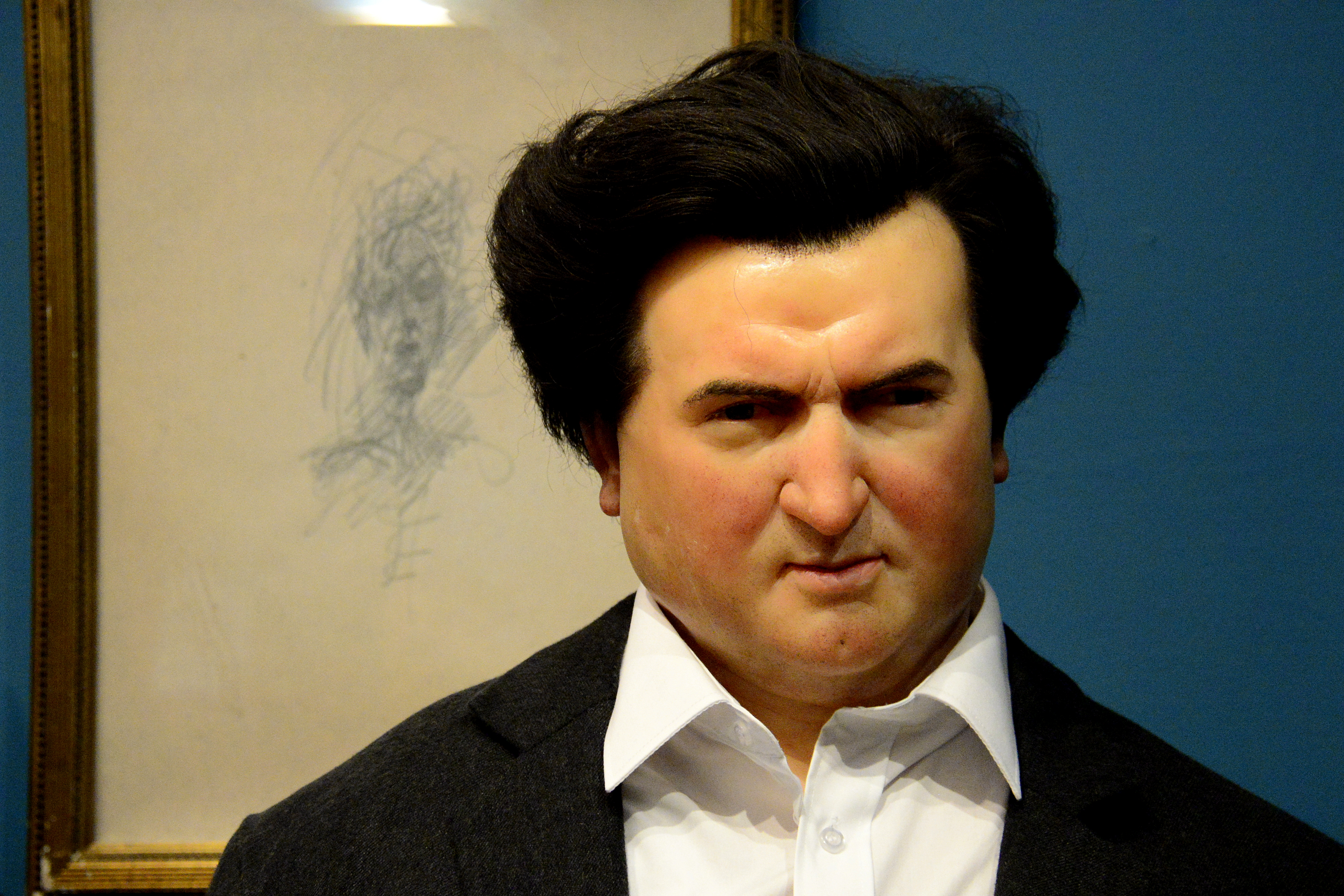
Brendan Behan

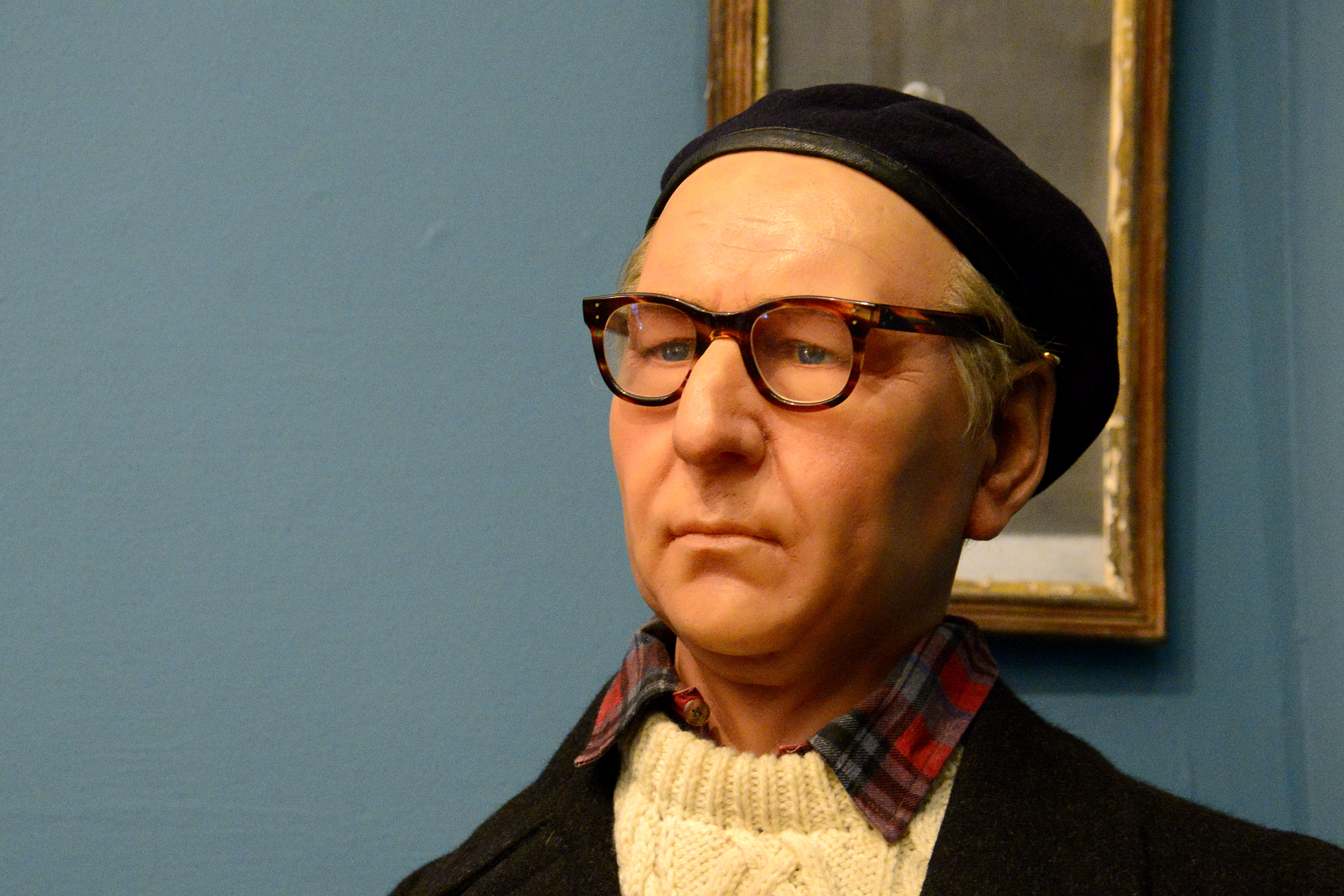
Patrick Kavanagh
