= Hibernian Bible Society =

The Hibernian Bible Society (originally known as the Dublin Bible Society) was founded in Dublin, Ireland in 1806, to encourage a wider circulation of the Bible in Ireland. The first meeting was held at the Royal Exchange, Dublin, on 10 November 1806, with Lord Belvedere in the chair.

It was founded by the Rev. Benjamin Williams Mathias (1772–1841), a leading figure in the evangelical movement in the Church of Ireland and others. On behalf of the society, Mathias travelled widely throughout the country, and he was a founder member of the Hibernian Church Missionary Society (1814) for evangelism overseas. A large number of Auxiliary Societies were established throughout Ireland in the decades following its founding. Rev. Dr. John H Singer served as secretary.

In 1812, the Ladies' Auxiliary Bible Society was set up in Dublin, in order to contribute to the society's work. This included contemporary figures Ladies Castlecoote and Molyneux, the Viscountesses of Lorton and Lifford and Countesses of Meath, Westmeath, and Leitrim. It was stressed how important it was that all duties attached to the Ladies' Auxiliary should be regulated with more than ordinary regard to propriety and decorum. Within a few years, the ladies in Ireland had set up 71 auxiliaries, 331 branches and 203 associations.

At its founding, the society was supported by the bishops of Dublin and Tuam. It was expected that it should confine itself to the task of circulating the Scriptures, without note or comment. In some quarters, the methods of the society failed to commend themselves to Churchmen of the Church of Ireland. Remonstrances were made from time to time, and animated discussions took place both in the committee and at the public meetings of the society. In the opinion of O'Beirne, Bishop of Meath, "the management of the Hibernian Bible Society has entirely fallen into the hands of sectaries and seceders, and the establishment of their auxiliary societies, wherever it takes place through the country, has for its immediate object the increase of the number of their proselytes, and the extension and prevalence of their doctrines."

With the Belfast Bible Society becoming independent and forming the Northern Ireland Bible Society in 1987, The Hibernian Bible Society changed its name to the Bible Society of Ireland and it changed again in 1989 to the National Bible Society of Ireland, and is member of the United Bible Societies since 1949.

Over the years the Bible society has become more ecumenical involving other denominations including Roman Catholic.

The National Bible Society of Ireland is headquartered at 41 Dawson Street, Dublin, where it operated a bookshop called Bestseller.

The Society hosts the Bedell-Boyle Lecture, each year named in honour of Bishop William Bedell and Robert Boyle.
