= Thomas Kelly (hymn-writer) =

Irish hymn writer and founder of the Kellyites

Thomas Kelly (13 July 1769 – 14 May 1855) was an Irish evangelical, known as a Church of Ireland cleric to 1803, hymn writer and founder of the Kellyites.

== Life ==
He was the son of Thomas Kelly (1723–1809), judge of the Court of Common Pleas (Ireland) and Frances Hickie, daughter of James Jephson Hickie of Carrick on Suir, and was born at the family seat, Kellyville (formerly Derrinroe), Queen's County, on 13 July 1769. He entered Trinity College, Dublin, in 1785, graduating B.A. in 1789. He was admitted to London's Middle Temple in 1786.

In Dublin, Kelly was influenced by John Walker (1769–1833), also a Trinity College undergraduate. He had been impressed with the views of William Romaine and the Hutchinsonians. Giving up on a legal career, he was ordained in the Church of Ireland in 1792; Walker was ordained too, by 1793. Two other friends were ordained at this period, Henry Maturin and Walter Shirley. Rowland Hill visited Dublin in 1793, and Kelly began to preach on grace in line with Hill's views. With others, he gave the Sunday afternoon sermons at St. Luke's Church, Dublin in early 1794. These provoked Robert Fowler, the Church of Ireland Archbishop of Dublin, who inhibited them on doctrinal grounds.

Kelly reacted first by preaching in unconsecrated Dublin locations: one on Plunket Street, another the Bethesda Chapel (which for a time he was a trustee). He went on to Athy. In 1795 he married, and moved out to Blackrock, where he built himself a chapel of ease.

With his allies, Kelly spread his evangelical views widely in Ireland. In 1802 he founded the religious sect that became known as the Kellyites, with half a dozen congregations, recruiting some ministers from Scotland, where the same year the seminary run by the Haldane brothers, Robert and James Alexander, moved from Glasgow to Edinburgh and expanded. In 1803 he broke with the Church of Ireland. The same year, Walker had gathered a group naming itself the Church of God, and he was expelled as a fellow of Trinity College, Dublin in 1804.

Kelly died in Dublin on 14 May 1855, having acted as minister in Athy and Dublin for half a century. After his death, his congregation dropped away.

== Hymn-writer ==
Kelly is believed to have written 765 hymns, published over 51 years; one of the most well-known is Look, ye saints, the sight is glorious.. A Collection of Psalms and Hymns (1802) contained 247, of which 33 were by Kelly. Hymns on Various Passages of Scripture (1804) ran to four editions, after which there was Hymns of Thomas Kelly, never before published (1815), followed by four further editions. He used unusual metres.

== Family ==
In 1795, Kelly married Elizabeth Tighe, eldest daughter of William Tighe (1738–1782), of Rosanna, County Wicklow, MP for Athboy and a supporter of John Wesley, and his wife Sarah Fownes, daughter of Sir William Fownes, 2nd Baronet. She brought a fortune to the marriage. They had two daughters, Elizabeth, who married Reverend Edward Wingfield, a younger son of the 4th Viscount Powerscourt, and Frances, who married Reverend Thomas Webber, and was the mother of General Charles Edmund Webber.
