= William Henry Krause =

Church of Ireland clergyman (1796–1852)

William Henry Krause (1796–1852) was a Church of Ireland priest and noted preacher.

Krause was born on the island of Saint Croix in the West Indies in 1796. Brought up in England, he was educated at Fulham and Richmond. He joined the army at 18, and fought in France, and at the Battle of Waterloo in 1815, with the 51st, Second West York, King's Own Light Infantry. After leaving the army, due to illness, he returned to his father in St. Croix. In 1822 he visited Ireland for the wedding of a friend, where he met Angelina Ridgeway and married her, she was instrumental in his conversion to evangelical Protestantism. Angelina Ridgeway Krause died shortly after giving birth to their only child Eliza Angelina Krause.

After seeking ordination unsuccessfully in England, Krause moved to Cavan where he worked for the evangelical supporting Lord Farnham.

Krause studied at Trinity College Dublin, gaining a BA in 1830, and later an MA. Ordained by the Bishop of Kilmore, he was appointed curate in Cavan. Rev. Krause served as chaplain in the Bethesda Chapel, Dublin, from 1840 until his death in 1852, many of his sermons were published after his death) He resided near the church at 45 Domnick Street.

Among those who attended his sermons and were influenced by Krause were John Pentland Mahaffy who became provost of Trinity College and Rev. Walter Thomas Turpin, who joined the Plymouth Brethren,

Krause was a trustee of the North Strand Episcopal Chapel Sunday School and Daily School.

Rev. Krause was noted for his anti-catholic beliefs and was a member of the Orange Order. His daughter married a Scottish clergyman Rev. William J. Pollock, and their son was a surgeon and a noted chess player William Henry Krause Pollock.

== Publications ==
- Lectures Delivered in Bethesda Chapel, Dublin, Volume 1, 2 and 3, by Rev. William Henry Krause.
- Sanctification in Christ Jesus by Robert Hawker DD, William Gadsby, and William Henry Krause MA, CBO Publications.
- Memoir of the Late Rev. W.H. Krause, A.M.: Minister of Bethesda Chapel, Dublin, with Selections from His Correspondence, William Henry Krause, Publisher George Herbert, 1854.
