= Ralph Smith O'bré =

Irish surgeon

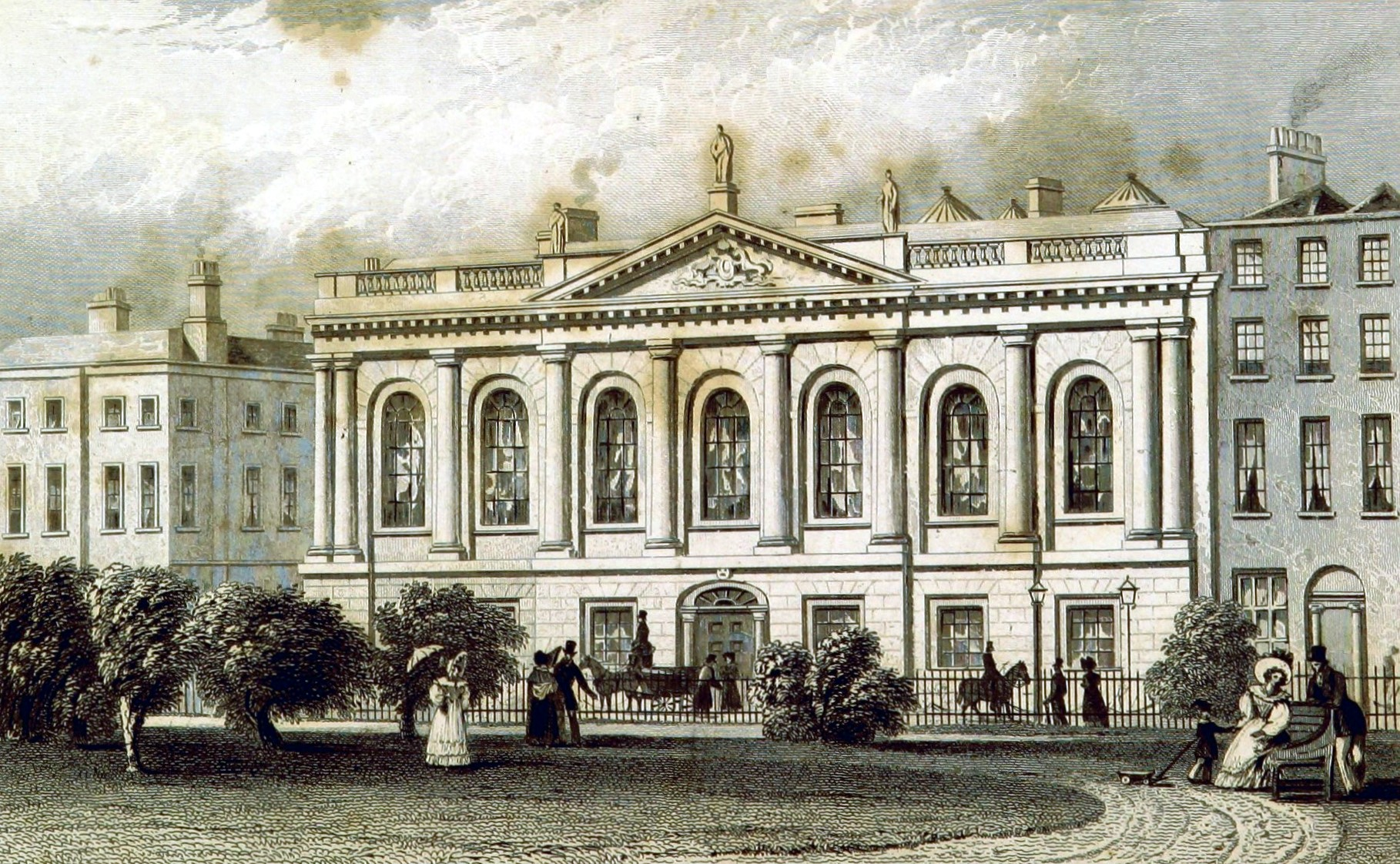
"The College of Surgeons, Dublin", (1837) Dublin delineated in twenty-six views, etc.

Ralph Smith O'bré (died August 1820) was an Irish medical doctor who was the president of the Royal College of Surgeons in Ireland (RCSI) in 1790. He served as an army surgeon before setting up practice in Dublin where he became wealthy. He invented a popular double tracheostomy tube.

== Early life and family ==
Ralph Smith O'bré's date and place of birth are unknown. Charles Cameron wrote in his history of the RCSI that the place was either Clantilow or Lisburn and that he was the second son of Edward Obre, of Clantilow (present day Loughgall), County Armagh, and his wife, Frances Smith, of Lisburn. According to Cameron, the ancestors of Obré were named Aubrey, which later took the "pseudo-Celtic" form of O'bré or Obré. He never married.

== Career ==
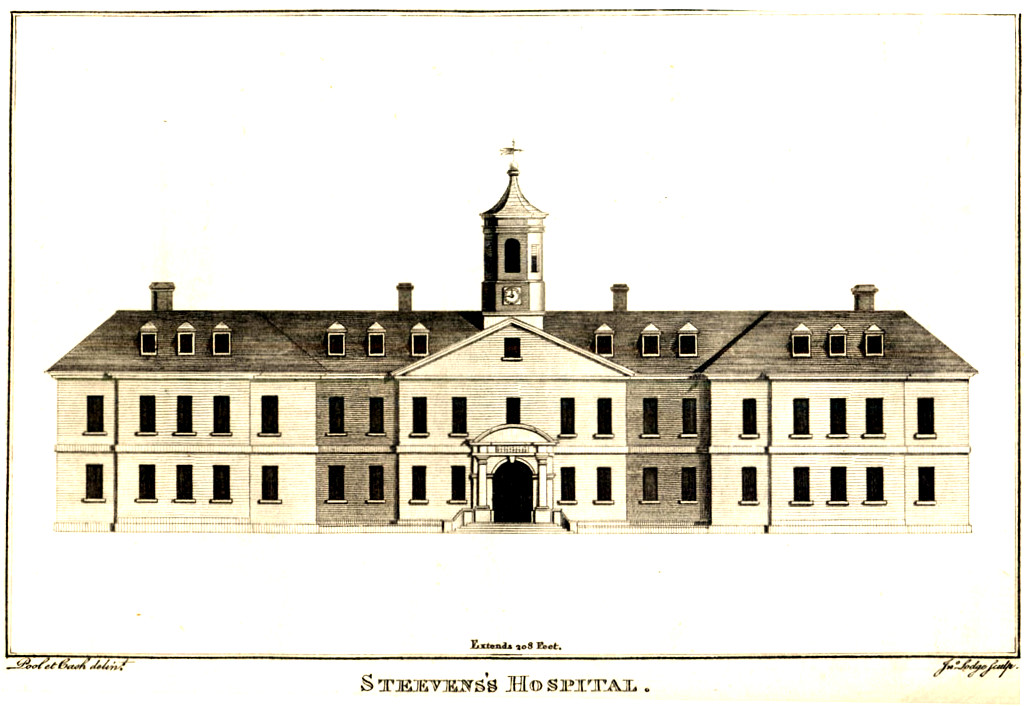
"Steevens's Hospital", 1780

O'bré served an apprenticeship with his brother-in-law Samuel Croker-King and was an army surgeon in the Irish establishment. He practised in Dublin, where he became wealthy.

In 1779, he was appointed assistant-surgeon to Steevens' Hospital. He followed Philip Woodroffe as College treasurer, a position he held for 27 years, but he resigned in 1820 on the grounds of ill-health. He was secretary to the Infirmaries' Board for several years and he was president of the Royal College of Surgeons in Ireland in 1790. He invented a double tracheostomy tube, which Cameron writes "appeared to have been much used at one time".

O'bré, who was of small stature, was a good friend of fellow surgeon Solomon Richards who was known for his large size and was said to be "the fattest surgeon in the United Kingdom". According to one story, which may be apocryphal, they were once robbed on the highway while returning from an operation in the country. O'bré saved himself by hiding behind Richards, who had all his money and surgical equipment stolen. In return, Richards gave up O'bré who was also robbed and Richards negotiated his own belongings back.

== Death ==
O'bré died in August 1820 at his house in Granby Row, Rutland Square. His estate was bequeathed to his relatives, with Henry Connor receiving the largest part.
