= Joseph Singer (bishop) =

Irish Anglican bishop

Joseph Henderson Singer (1786–1866) was an Irish Anglican bishop in the Church of Ireland in the 19th century.

He was the son of James Singer the Deputy Commissary-General of the Forces in Ireland and Elizabeth Henderson. He became a Fellow of Trinity College Dublin in 1810 and was subsequently its Regius Professor of Divinity and Erasmus Smith's Professor of Modern History. He became Bishop of Meath in 1852 and died in post on 16 July 1866.

Dr. Singer was a member of and served as secretary to the Royal Irish Academy.

He was a leading member of the Evangelical body of the Irish Church and a strong opponent of the National Board of Education.

Rev. Singer served as Chaplain to the Magdalen Asylum on Leeson Street. He served on committees and was a trustee a number of Church of Ireland and benevolent societies, such as the Protestant Orphan Society, as secretary of the Hibernian Bible Society, a trustee of North Strand Episcopal Chapel and Schools. He was a committee member of the Continental Society, the Church Education Society for Ireland, the Incorporated Society for Promoting English Protestant Schools in Ireland, Irish Auxiliary of the London Society for the Promotion of Christianity Amongst Jews and the Irish Society for promoting the reformed faith and educating in the Irish Language. At Trinity, Singer tutored John Nelson Darby the evangelical Christian.

His brother Paulus Aemilius Singer BL(Lincoln's Inn), was also a strong supporter of evangelical initiatives and benevolent bodies in Dublin, another brother Major James Singer of the 7th Fusiliers, who was killed in 1812 at Badajos, in Spain, in the Peninsular Wars.

In 1822 he married Mary, daughter of Henry Crofton, Senior Chaplain at the Royal Hospital Kilmainham, and left four sons and three daughters. His son named after his brother Rev. Paulus Aemilius Singer MA, followed him into the priesthood.
