= Granby Row, Dublin =

Street in Dublin, Ireland

Granby Row
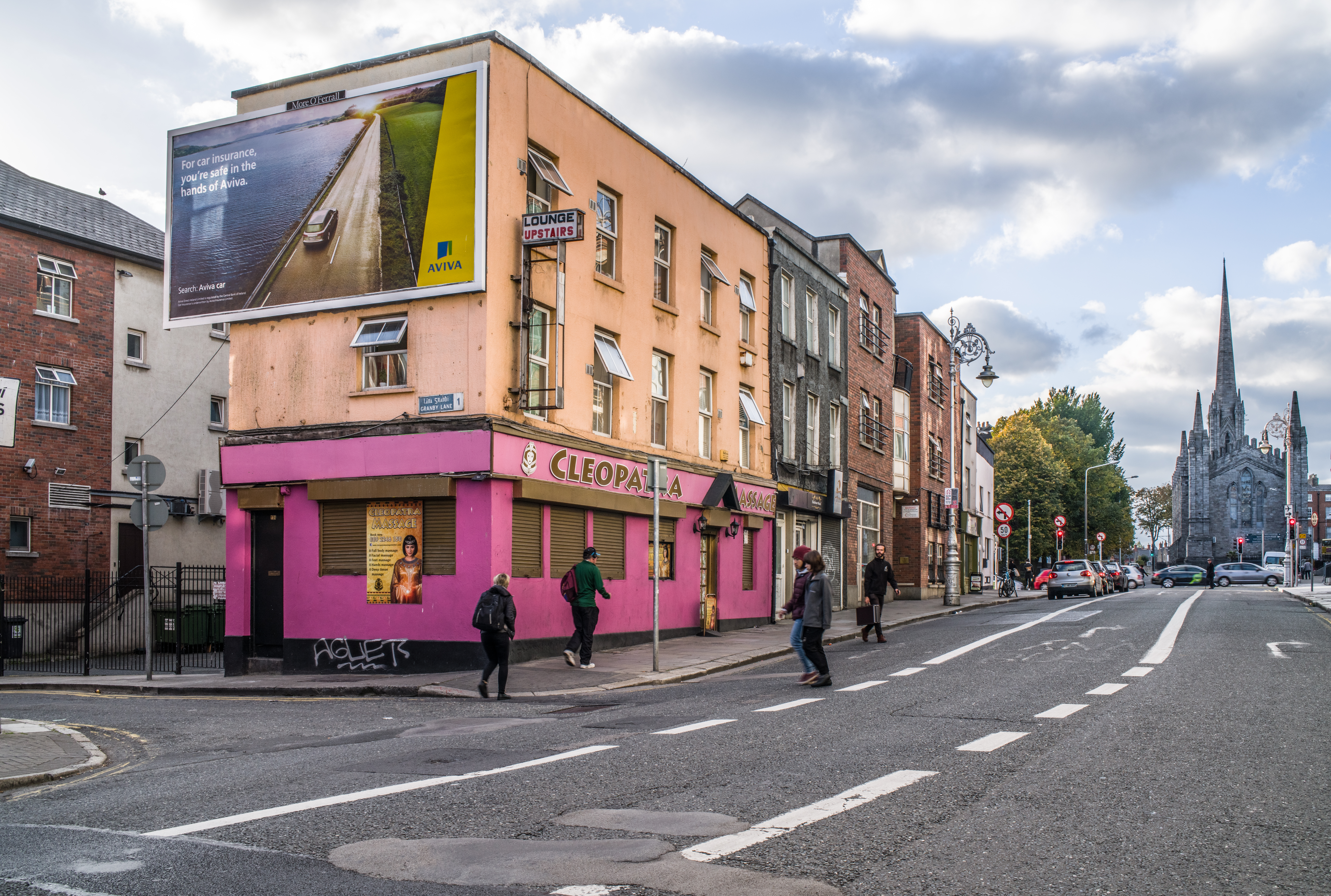
- Western side of Granby Row in 2018
- Interactive map of Granby Row
- Native name: Rae Granby (Irish)
- Namesake: John Manners, Marquess of Granby
- Location: Dublin, Ireland
- Postal code: D01
- Coordinates: 53°21′13″N 6°15′55″W
- north end: Dorset Street
- south end: Parnell Square

Granby Row (Irish: Rae Granby) is a street in Dublin which connects Dorset Street to the north and Parnell Square to the south.

== History ==
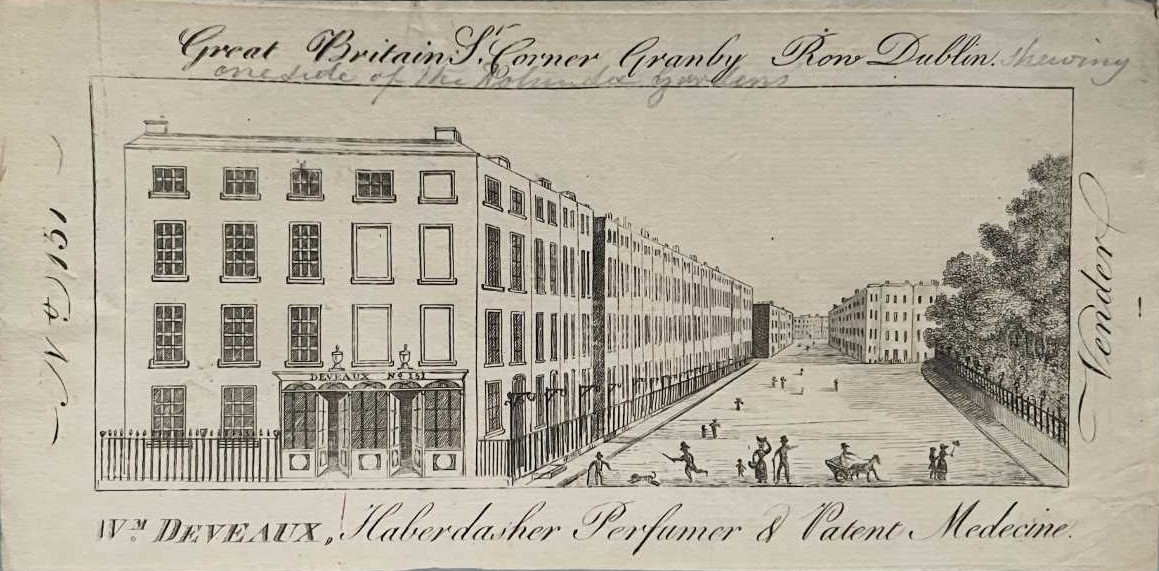
Trade card from 1700s. Showing the corner of Rutland Square (modern Parnell Square) and Great Britain Street (Parnell Street), Dublin with Granby Row in the distance.

Granby Row was named for John Manners, Marquess of Granby. The adjoining Rutland Square (now Parnell Square) was named after his son, Charles Manners, fourth Duke of Rutland. The Street was developed around 1766.

There are a number of Georgian houses extant on the street, with numbers 1 to 5 noted for their architectural interest. The houses built as Palace Row along Parnell Square North adjoin the street, with an entrance to the former Coláiste Mhuire on Granby Row.

On the corner of Granby Row and Dorset Street, where a hotel now occupies the site, there were previously two notable buildings: firstly, the original Bethesda Chapel built in 1784 and a later version of the Bethesda Chapel which was renovated and reclad and became the Plaza Cinema and later again the National Wax Museum. The second iteration of the Bethesda Chapel was a protestant chapel that dated from 1839 and was redeveloped into the Plaza Cinema from 1911, with a modern cladding and extension added to the building in 1967, designed by Stephenson Gibney & Associates. When the cinema closed, it became the National Wax Museum from 1983. The building was demolished in 2005 and replaced with a hotel owned by Donnie Cassidy.

== Notable Residents ==
- Robert Ball, naturalist, lived in 3 Granby Row.
- Robert Stawell Ball, astronomer and mathematician, was born in 3 Granby Row, the house previously had a plaque to Ball.
- Ralph Smith O'bré, medical doctor.
- Edward Newenham, politician.
- Roger Chambers Walker, landowner, barrister, and antiquary, lived in 2 Granby Row.
