= Henry Maturin =

Irish cricketer and physician

Personal information
- Full name: Henry Maturin
- Born: 5 April 1842; Clondevaddock, Ireland
- Died: 24 February 1920 (aged 77); Hartley Wintney, Hampshire, England
- Height: 5 ft 5 in (1.65 m)
- Batting: Right-handed
- Bowling: Right-arm roundarm fast

Domestic team information
- Years: Team
- 1863: Middlesex
- 1864–1882: Hampshire

Career statistics
Competition	First-class
Matches	12
Runs scored	178
Batting average	9.88
100s/50s	–/–
Top score	28
Balls bowled	436
Wickets	8
Bowling average	33.50
5 wickets in innings	–
10 wickets in match	–
Best bowling	4/68
Catches/stumpings	7/–
- Source: Cricinfo, 2 February 2010

Henry Maturin (5 April 1842 — 24 February 1920) was an Irish first-class cricketer and physician.

== Life and first-class cricket ==
The son of The Reverend Benjamin Maturin, he was born in Ireland at Clondevaddock. He was educated in England at Marlborough College, where he played for the college cricket team. From there, he undertook his medical education and training at St Bartholomew's Hospital. He was appointed a MRCS in 1864 and was appointed to the Worshipful Society of Apothecaries in 1865, before being appointed an LRCP and a fellow of Royal College of Physicians of Edinburgh in 1872. He held a number of medical posts within Hampshire, including as medical officer of the 1st District of the Hartley Wintney Union and the 7th District of the Basingstoke Union.

In cricket, Maturin made his debut in first-class cricket for an early Middlesex county team against the Marylebone Cricket Club at Lord's in 1863, in what was his only appearance for Middlesex. In that same season, he also appeared in a minor match for an early Hampshire county team against Surrey, helping to inflict what would be Surrey's only defeat of the 1863 season. The following season, he played for the recently founded Hampshire County Cricket Club in their second appearance in first-class cricket against the recently founded Middlesex County Cricket Club at Islington. Maturin played first-class cricket for Hampshire infrequently, making nine appearances to 1882. Described by Arthur Haygarth in Scores and Biographies as "an excellent batsman, with a fine, free style", he scored 136 runs for Hampshire at an average of 9.71, with a highest score of 28. As a roundarm fast bowler, he took 6 wickets for Hampshire, with best figures of 4 for 68. In addition to playing for Middlesex and Hampshire, he also made a single first-class appearance for the Gentlemen of the South against the Players of the South at The Oval in 1864. While his appearances in first-class cricket were limited, he did play club cricket in village matches, doing so until he was well past 70 years of age. Maturin died at Hartley Wintney in February 1920.
