= William Hamilton (Irish minister) =

Irish geologist, naturalist and political activist

The Rev. William Hamilton (1755–1797) was an Irish Protestant minister, geologist, meteorologist and antiquarian, killed by a mob for his pro-British views. His book, Letters Concerning the North Coast of Antrim, was pivotal in the vulcanist understanding of the history of the planet and was translated into several languages.

He founded the group, the Palæosophers, which together with the Neosophers, later merged to create the Royal Irish Academy.

== Life ==
He was born on 16 December 1755 in Derry in Ulster, Ireland, the son of John Hamilton, a merchant. He studied at Trinity College Dublin, graduating BA in 1776. In 1779 he was granted an MA and also made a Fellow of the College.

In 1788 (apparently during a visit to Scotland) he was elected a Fellow of the Royal Society of Edinburgh. His proposers were John Walker, Adam Smith and James Hutton.

In 1790 he was appointed Church of Ireland Rector of Clondavaddog (sometimes called Faust) on the Fanad Peninsula on the north coast of County Donegal in Ulster. The parish lies on the shores of Lough Swilly. In this role he acted as both clergyman and local magistrate, and in the latter represented the views of the British authorities, and caused increasing friction with some of his parishioners and with the local Catholic community. This came to a head in 1797. In February, his parsonage was attacked and he sought (and received) an armed military guard from the county.

On 2 March 1797 he took a boat trip on Lough Swilly and bad weather caused him to divert to the small hamlet of Sharon Glebe, near Manorcunningham in the Laggan district of East Donegal. Here he took shelter in Sharon Rectory, the house of Dr Waller, a friend. However, the locals, who were mostly Presbyterian, learned of this and took advantage, Dr Waller's house not being as well guarded as the minister's. The mob outside threatened to burn the house down. When Dr Waller's wife was shot and killed whilst looking down on the crowd from an upper window, the servants could stand it no more. They forcibly ejected The Rev. Hamilton out of the house, where he was instantly killed by the angry Laggan mob. The servants hid behind the locked door and on opening it in the early hours of 3 March found Hamilton's corpse still lying there.

The action was an important precursor to the Irish Rebellion of 1798 and typified the anti-establishment feeling within the Irish community. Whilst Hamilton was wholly Irish, his pro-British stance was no longer being tolerated.

He left a wife and nine children.

He is buried in St Columb's Cathedral in Derry.

== Publications ==
- Letters Concerning the North Coast of Antrim (1786)
- Account of Experiments for Determining the Temperature of the Earth’s Surface (1788)
- Memoir on the Climate of Ireland (1794)
