= Benjamin Williams Mathias =

Benjamin Williams Mathias MA (1772–1841), was a Church of Ireland priest, who founded in 1806 the Dublin Bible Society which became the Hibernian Bible Society.

Born in Dublin on 12 November 1772, he had a presbyterian upbringing. His father Benjamin Mathias, worked in the Wollen industry was originally of Haverfordwest, Pembrokeshire, Wales. He studied at Trinity College Dublin from 1791 to 1796, where he met and was influenced by Dr. John Walker. He was ordained a curate for Drumgooland, Co. Down in 1797, where Rev. Tobais Tighe was rector.

He a leading figure in the evangelical movement in the Church of Ireland. He served as Chaplain to the Bethesda Chapel, Dublin from 1805 succeeding Dr. Walker, until 1835(resigning due to ill-health) and its subsidiary Schools, Asylum and Lock Penitentiary, keeping the chapel within the established church, eventually in 1825 getting officially licensed by the Church of Ireland, despite the evangelical zeal of many of its attendees and preachers who seceded.

On behalf of the society, Mathias traveled widely throughout the country, and he was a founder member of the Hibernian Church Missionary Society (1814) for evangelism overseas.

Mathias befriended the family of the mathematician Sir William Rowan Hamilton, whom he christened in 1805 in Bethesda Chapel, in the parish of St. Mary's.

He retired from Bethesda in 1835 due to ill health and died in 1841.

== Publications ==
- A Compendious History of the Council of Trent by Benjamin Williams Mathias, published by William Curry, 1832.
- Memorials of Rev. B. W. Mathias, late chaplain of Bethesda, published by William Curry, 1842.
