= John Alcock (archdeacon of Waterford) =

- Born: 23 October 1804; Kilkenny
- Died: 15 September 1886 (aged 81); Waterford
- Occupation: Irish Anglican priest

John Alcock (23 October 1804, in Kilkenny – 15 September 1886, in Waterford) was an Irish Anglican priest in the late 19th and early 20th centuries.

He was educated at Trinity College, Dublin and ordained in 1829. He was Perpetual curate of the Bethseda Chapel, Dublin from 1852 to 1866; and Rector of Waterford from 1866 until his death.

== Sermons ==
- A Shock of Corn Fully Ripe: A Sermon Preached in Bethesda Chapel, on the Occasion of the Death of Arthur Guinness, Esq., by Rev. John Alcock AM, 17 June 1855.
- National Sins and National Calamity by Rev. John Alcock, preached in Bethesda Chapel on the day of fasting and prayer for the Crimea War, Wednesday, 21 March 1855.

Church of Ireland titles
Preceded by Robert Bell	Archdeacon of Waterford; 1879–1886	Succeeded by Robert Jones Sylvester Devenish
