= Jonathan Spilsbury =

British engraver (c.1737–1812)

Jonathan Spilsbury (1737?–1812) was a British engraver, the brother of John Spilsbury, with whom he has sometimes been confused, and father of Maria Spilsbury.

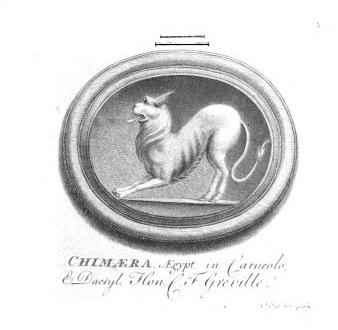
Chimera engraved from an antique gem. From a collection issued by John Boydell and incorrectly attributed by the publisher to John Spilsbury—in fact by Jonathan Spilsbury.

== Works ==
Spilsbury practised chiefly in mezzotint, and between 1759 and 1789 produced many plates, mainly portraits, which included:

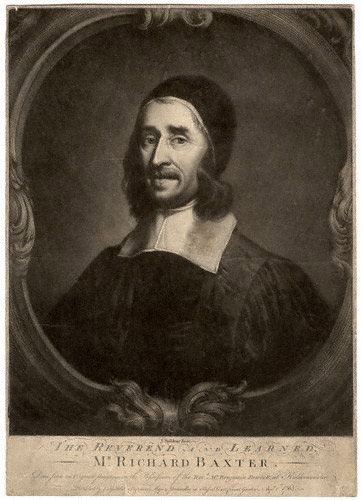
Engraving of Richard Baxter after John Riley, by Jonathan Spilsbury.

- Richard Baxter;
- John Bunyan, after Thomas Sadler;
- Charles Pratt, 1st Earl Camden, after William Hoare;
- Miss Jacob, and Frederick Howard, 5th Earl of Carlisle, after Joshua Reynolds;
- Inigo Jones, after Anthony van Dyck;
- John Wesley, after George Romney; and
- George III and Queen Charlotte, from his own drawings.

He also engraved subject-pieces after Murillo, Rembrandt, Rubens, Metzu, Angelica Kauffman, and others For his print of Miss Jacob, Spilsbury was awarded a premium by the Society of Arts in 1761, and for that of the Earl of Carlisle another in 1763. He exhibited original portraits and biblical compositions with the Society of Artists of Great Britain in 1763, 1770, and 1771, and at the Royal Academy from 1776 to 1784. He contributed a picture of The Widow of Zarepta to the British Institution in 1807.

== Notes ==
Attribution

This article incorporates text from a publication now in the public domain: "Spilsbury, Jonathan". Dictionary of National Biography. London: Smith, Elder & Co. 1885–1900.
