= Clondavaddog =

Civil parish in County Donegal, Ireland

Coordinates: 55.19°N 7.68°W

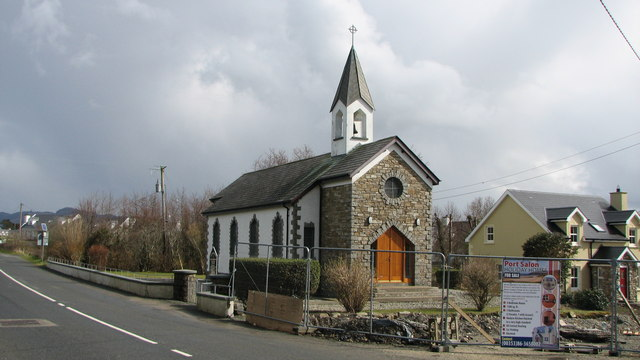
All Saints church, in Portsalon is in the Church of Ireland parish of Clondevaddock

Clondavaddog (Irish: Cluain Dabhaodóg) is a civil parish in the northern part of the Fanad peninsula in County Donegal, Ireland. It is in the historical barony of Kilmacrenan. Clondavaddog is also an ecclesiastical parish in the Roman Catholic Diocese of Raphoe. Clondevaddock ("Christ The Redeemer") is also a parish in the Church of Ireland Diocese of Derry and Raphoe.

== History ==
William Hamilton, who had been appointed the Protestant minister of Clondavaddog in 1790, was killed by an angry mob near Manorcunningham in March 1797. This was one of several precursors to the Irish Rebellion of 1798.

== Notable people ==
- Henry Maturin (1842–1920), Irish cricketer and physician
