= Bethesda Chapel, Dublin =

Church in Ireland

Bethesda Chapel
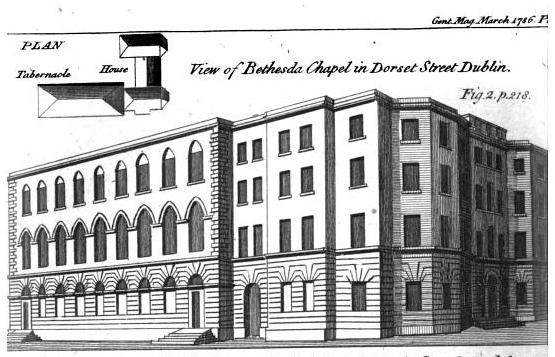
- The Bethesda Chapel, Dublin, 1786 engraving

- Location within Central Dublin

General information
- Status: Demolished
- Type: Church
- Architectural style: Georgian
- Location: Granby Row, Dublin 1, Ireland
- Coordinates: 53.354274°N 6.266512°W
- Demolished: Following a fire (1839); Change of use (1910); Final (2005)

Design and construction
- Architects: Unknown (1784); Frederick Darley (1840); Batchelor & Hicks (1910) - conversion to cinema
- Developer: William Smyth (1784)

The Bethesda Chapel, Dublin, was an Episcopal Church of Ireland, church on Granby Row and Dorset Street, Dublin.

== History ==
=== Chapel ===
The Bethesda chapel was founded in 1784 by Dublin merchant William Smyth (Smythe), nephew of the bishop of the same name, who appointed two clergy to officiate at the Chapel. Its development was part of the evangelical movement within the Church of Ireland. It did not secure episcopal recognition until 1825.

The Bethesda Chapel was sometimes known as the Bethesda Mission, or the Bethesda Episcopal church. The original 1785 chapel on the site was burned down after a great storm in January 1839: a new chapel was built on the site, designed by Frederick Darley and opened in December 1840. The Bethesda Female Orphan School at 77 then 23 Upper Dorset Street was affiliated to the Chapel from 1787. 77 Dorset Street became the Presbyterian Female Orphan School associated with the Ormond Quay Presbyterian church. On the 19th of March, 1794, the Lock Penitentiary was opened by Mr. Walker: it housed females leaving Lock Hospital: as a result of it being part of the site, the church was sometimes called Locks Chapel. The penitentiary or asylum was funded by benefactors and by church collections; also its inmates made a living washing and mangling clothes. Arthur Guinness and his wife served on the governing committee of the Penitentiary, as did J.D. La Touche. The penitentiary was also destroyed in the 1839 fire.

The founder of Methodism, John Wesley, preached at the chapel on a number of occasions in April 1787, during his tour of Ireland. The chapel would have been supported by Lady Huntingdon who supported many non-conformists in Ireland and Britain.

Following the death of William Smyth, the control of the Chapel was passed in 1794 to a board of five trustees, all members of the clergy.

Chaplains to the Chapel included Rev. Edward Smyth (Brother of founder William Smyth, who was a friend of John Wesley and perceived as a Methodist though he had been expelled from his position in Ballycutter in the Derry Diocese), Rev. William Mann, Rev. John Walker from 1793 until 1804 (a dissident who left to found The Church of God), gave the Chapel a more Calvinistic ethos, other ministers at the church were Rev. Henry Maturin, Rev. Benjamin Williams Mathias (pastor from 1805 until 1835), John Gregg (future Bishop of Cork; chaplain from 1835 until 1839), the noted preacher Rev. William Henry Krause (from 1840 until his death in 1852; many of his sermons were published after his death), Rev. John Alcock AM, (chaplain/perpetual curate from 1852 to 1866). and Rev. Charles H. H. Wright, D.D. In 1878, Rev. Ambrose Wellesley Leet D.D. was appointed to the Bethesda Church, Dublin. The evangelical hymn-writer Thomas Kelly was a trustee and preached at Bethesda.

Bethesda was within the Church of Ireland Parish of St. Mary's, whose main church was St Mary's Church, Mary Street, Dublin, it was a few minutes walk from The Episcopal chapel of the Rotunda (Lying-in) Hospital and even closer to the Bethesda Episcopal chapel and even closer to the St. Mary's Chapel of Ease.

Bethesda ceased to be a chapel and was secularised in 1908.

=== Later uses ===
In 1910 the building was converted into a cinema, under various names: Shanleys Picture Hall, The Dorset Picture Hall and The Plaza Cinema. It got a major facelift in the 1960s and in 1981 it closed as a cinema and was later reopened as the National Waxworks Museum, owned by former TD and Senator Donie Cassidy. The building was demolished in 2005, and the site was redeveloped by Cassidy as a hotel. The Maldron Hotel owned by the Dalata Hotel Group operate the hotel as of 2022.

== Publications associated with Bethesda ==
- Hymns, to be sung in Bethesda Chapel, on Sunday morning, the 4th of February, 1798, J. Charrurer, printer, 128, Capel Street, Dublin, Ireland, 1798.
- A Choice Collection of Hymns, Psalms, and Anthems by the Rev. Edward Smyth, printed by Bennett Dugdale, 150, Capel St., Dublin 1785.
- A selection of hymns, used in Bethesda Chapel, Dorset Street, printed by Robert Napper, Capel St., Dublin, 1819.
- Memorials of Rev. B.W. Mathias, Late Chaplain of Bethesda Chapel, by William Curry, Dublin, 1842.
