= List of 16th-century religious leaders =

This is a list of the top-level leaders for religious groups with at least 50,000 adherents, and that led anytime from January 1, 1501, to December 31, 1600. It should likewise only name leaders listed on other articles and lists.

== Buddhism ==
- Jodo Shinshu (complete list) –
  - Hongwanji-ha
    - Jitsunyo, Head Priest (1489–1525)
    - Shōnyo, Head Priest (1525–1554)
    - Kennyo, Monshu (1554–1592)
    - Junnyo, Monshu (1593–1630)

== Christianity ==
=== Catholicism ===
- Roman Catholic Church (complete list) -

- Alexander VI, Pope (1492–1503)
- Pius III, Pope (1503)
- Julius II, Pope (1503–1513)
- Leo X, Pope (1513–1521)
- Adrian VI, Pope (1522–1523)
- Clement VII, Pope (1523–1534)
- Paul III, Pope (1534–1549)
- Julius III, Pope (1550–1555)
- Marcellus II, Pope (1555)
- Paul IV, Pope (1555–1559)
- Pius IV, Pope (1559–1565)
- Pius V, Pope (1566–1572)
- Gregory XIII, Pope (1572–1585)
- Sixtus V, Pope (1585–1590)
- Urban VII, Pope (1590)
- Gregory XIV, Pope (1590–1591)
- Innocent IX, Pope (1591)
- Clement VIII, Pope (1592–1605)

=== Eastern Orthodoxy ===
- Church of Constantinople - (complete list), the first among equals in Eastern Orthodoxy

- Joachim I, Ecumenical Patriarch of Constantinople (1498–1502, 1504)
- Nephon II, Ecumenical Patriarch of Constantinople (1486–1488, 1497–1498, 1502)
- Pachomius I, Ecumenical Patriarch of Constantinople (1503–1504, 1504–1513)
- Theoleptus I, Ecumenical Patriarch of Constantinople (1513–1522)
- Jeremias I, Ecumenical Patriarch of Constantinople (1522–1545)
- Joannicius I, Ecumenical Patriarch of Constantinople (1546)
- Dionysius II, Ecumenical Patriarch of Constantinople (1546–1555)
- Joasaph II, Ecumenical Patriarch of Constantinople (1555–1565)
- Metrophanes III, Ecumenical Patriarch of Constantinople (1565–1572, 1579–1580)
- Jeremias II Tranos, Ecumenical Patriarch of Constantinople (1572–1579, 1580–1584, 1587–1595)
- Pachomius II, Ecumenical Patriarch of Constantinople (1584–1585)
- Theoleptus II, Ecumenical Patriarch of Constantinople (1585–1586)
- Matthew II, Ecumenical Patriarch of Constantinople (1596, 1598–1602, 1603)
- Gabriel I, Ecumenical Patriarch of Constantinople (1596)
- Theophanes I Karykes, Ecumenical Patriarch of Constantinople (1597)
- Meletius I Pegas, Ecumenical Patriarch of Constantinople (1597–1598)

=== Oriental Orthodoxy ===
- Coptic Orthodox Church, (complete list) -

- John XIII, Pope and Patriarch (1483–1524)
- vacant (1524–1526)
- Gabriel VII, Pope and Patriarch (1526–1569)
- vacant (1569–1573)
- John XIV, Pope and Patriarch (1573–1589)
- Gabriel VIII, Pope and Patriarch (1587–1603)

- Ethiopian Church, (complete list) -

- Yeshaq (1481– c. 1520) and Marqos (1481– c. 1530)
- João Bermudes (c. 1536–c. 1545), self-proclaimed Ethiopian Orthodox Abuna, and Catholic Patriarch of Ethiopia and Alexandria
- Endyras (c. 1545–?)
- Andrés de Oviedo (1557–1577), Catholic bishop
- Marqos (c. 1565)
- Krestodolos I (c. 1590)
- Petros (1599?–1607)

- Syriac Orthodox Church, (complete list) -

- Ignatius Noah of Lebanon, Patriarch of Antioch (1493/1494–1509)
- Ignatius Yeshu I, Patriarch of Antioch (1509–1510/1519)
- Ignatius Jacob I, Patriarch of Antioch (1510/1512–1517/1519)
- Ignatius David I, Patriarch of Antioch (1519–1521)
- Ignatius Abdullah I, Patriarch of Antioch (1521–1557)
- Ignatius Nemet Aloho, Patriarch of Antioch (1557–1576)
- Ignatius David II Shah, Patriarch of Antioch (1576–1591)
- Ignatius Pilate, Patriarch of Antioch (1591–1597)
- Ignatius Hidayat Aloho, Patriarch of Antioch (1597/1598–1640)

=== Protestantism ===
==== Lutheran ====
- Finnish Church, (complete list) -

- Archbishop of Turku (complete list) –
  - Arvid Kurck, Bishop of Turku (1510–1522)
  - Ericus Svenonius, Bishop of Turku (1523–1527)
  - Martti Skytte, Bishop of Turku (1528–1550)
  - Mikael Agricola, Bishop of Turku (1554–1557)
  - Petrus Follingius, Bishop of Turku (1558–1563)
  - Paulus Juusten, Bishop of Turku (1563–1575)
  - Ericus Erici Sorolainen, Bishop of Turku (1583–1625)
- Bishop of Tampere (complete list) –

- Paulus Juusten, Bishop of Tampere (1554–1563)
- Canutus Johannis, Bishop of Tampere (1563–1564)
- Eerik Härkäpää, Bishop of Tampere (1568–1678)

- Church of Sweden, (complete list) -

- Archbishop of Uppsala (complete list) –
  - Laurentius Petri, Archbishop (1531–1573)
  - Laurentius Petri Gothus, Archbishop (1574[5]–1579)
  - Andreas Laurentii Björnram, Archbishop (1583–1591)
  - Abraham Angermannus, Archbishop (1593–1595)
  - Nicolaus Olai Bothniensis, Archbishop (1599–1600)
  - Olaus Martini, Archbishop (1600–1609)

- Church of England

- Supreme Governor of the Church of England (complete list) –

- Henry VIII, Supreme Head (1536–1547)
- Edward VI, Supreme Head (1547–1553)
- Lady Jane Grey, Supreme Head (1553)
- Mary I of England and Philip II of Spain, Supreme Head (1553–1559)
- Elizabeth I, Supreme Governor (1559–1603)

- Archbishop of Canterbury (complete list) –

- Thomas Cranmer, Archbishop (1533–1555)
- Matthew Parker, Archbishop (1559–1575)
- Edmund Grindal, Archbishop (1575–1583)
- John Whitgift, Archbishop (1583–1604)

- Archbishop of York (complete list) –

- Edward Lee, Archbishop (1531–1544)
- Robert Holgate, Archbishop (1545–1554)
- Nicholas Heath, Archbishop (1555–1559)
- Thomas Young, Archbishop (1561–1568)
- Edmund Grindal, Archbishop (1570–1576)
- Edwin Sandys, Archbishop (1577–1588)
- John Piers, Archbishop (1589–1594)
- Matthew Hutton, Archbishop (1595–1606)

- Church of Ireland

- Archbishop of Armagh (complete list) –

- John Kite, Archbishop (1513–1521)
- George Cromer, Archbishop (1521–1543)
- Robert Wauchope, Archbishop (1539–1551)
- George Dowdall, Archbishop (1543–1551)
- Hugh Goodacre, Archbishop (1552–1553)
- George Dowdall, Archbishop (1553–1558)
- Adam Loftus, Archbishop (1562–1567)
- Thomas Lancaster, Archbishop (1568–1584)
- John Longe, Archbishop (1584–1589)
- John Garvey, Archbishop (1589–1595)
- Henry Ussher, Archbishop (1595–1613)

- Archbishop of Dublin (complete list) –

- George Browne, Archbishop (1536–1554)
- Hugh Curwen, Archbishop (1555–1567)
- Adam Loftus, Archbishop (1567–1605)

- Church of Scotland

- Archbishop of St Andrews (complete list) –

- John Douglas, Archbishop (1571–1574)
- Patrick Adamson, Archbishop (1575–1592)

- Archbishop of Glasgow (complete list) –

- James Hamilton, Archbishop (1547–1548)
- Donald Campbell, Archbishop (1548)
- Alexander Gordon, Archbishop (1550–1551)
- John Porterfield, Archbishop (1571–1572)
- James Boyd, Archbishop (1573–1581)
- Robert Montgomerie, Archbishop (1581–1585)
- William Erskine, Archbishop (1585–1587)
- Walter Stewart, Archbishop (1585–1587)

== Islam ==
=== Sunni ===
- Abbasid Caliphate, Cairo (complete list) –

- al-Mustamsik, Caliph (1497–1508, 1516–1517)
- al-Mutawakkil III, Caliph (1508–1516, 1517)

- Ottoman Empire, (complete list) -

- Selim I, Caliph (1517–1520)
- Suleiman the Magnificent, Caliph (1520–1566)
- Selim II, Caliph (1566–1574)
- Murad III, Caliph (1574–1595)
- Mehmed III, Caliph (1595–1603)

- Sheikh-ul-Islams of the Ottoman Empire, (complete list) -

- Efdalzâde Hamîdüddin Efendi (1496–1503)
- Zenbilli Ali Efendi (1503–1526)
- Kemalpaşazâde (1526–1534)
- Sâdî Çelebi (1534–1539)
- Çivizâde Muhyiddin Mehmed Efendi (1539–1542)
- Abdülkadir Hamîdî Çelebi (1542–1543)
- Fenârîzâde Muhyiddin Çelebi (1543–1545)
- Ebüssuûd Efendi (1545–1574)
- Çivizâde Damadı Hâmid Efendi (1574–1577)
- Ahmed Şemseddin Kadizâde (1577–1580)
- Mâlûlzâde Mehmed Efendi (1580–1582)
- Çivizâde Mehmed Efendi (1582–1587)
- Abdülkadir Şeyhî Efendi (1587–1589)
- Bostanzâde Mehmed Efendi (1589–1592)
- Bayramzâde Zekeriyyâ Efendi (1592–1593)
- Bostanzâde Mehmed Efendi (1593–1598)
- Hoca Sâdeddin Efendi (1598–1599)
- Sun‘ullah Efendi (1599–1601)
- Hocazâde Mehmed Efendi (1601–1603)

=== Shia ===
- Twelver Islam

- Imams (complete list) –

- Muhammad al-Mahdi, Imam (874–present) Shia belief holds that he was hidden by Allah in 874.

- Nizari Isma'ilism (complete list) –

- Abu Dharr Ali, Imam (1498–1509)
- Murad Mirza, Imam (1509–1574)
- Shah Khalilullah I Dhūʾl-Faqār ʿAlī, Imam (1574–1634)

- Zaidiyyah (complete list) –

- al-Mansur Muhammad, Imam (1475–1504)
- an-Nasir al-Hasan, Imam (1495–1523)
- al-Mutawakkil Yahya Sharaf ad-Din, Imam (1506–1555)
- al-Mutahhar, Imam (1547–1572)
- an-Nasir al-Hasan bin Ali, Imam (1579–1585)
- al-Mansur al-Qasim, Imam (1597–1620)

- Mumini (complete list) –

- Radi al-Din II bin Tahir, Imam (?–1509)
- Shah Tahir bin Radi al-Din II al-Husayni ad-Dakkani, Imam (1509–1549)
- Haydar bin Shah Tahir, Imam (1549–1586)
- Sadr al-Din Muhammad bin Haydar, Imam (1586–1622)

- Dawoodi Bohra (complete list) –

- Hasan Badruddin bin Idrees, Da'i al-Mutlaq (1467–1512)
- Husain Husamuddin, Da'i al-Mutlaq (1512–1527)
- Ali Shams al-Din III, Da'i al-Mutlaq (1527)
- Mohammad Ezzuddin, Da'i al-Mutlaq (1527–1539)
- Yusuf Najmuddin ibn Sulaiman, Da'i al-Mutlaq (1539–1567)
- Jalal Shamshuddin bin Hasan, Da'i al-Mutlaq (1567–1568)
- Dawood Bin Ajabshah, Da'i al-Mutlaq (1568–1591)
- Dawood Bin Qutubshah, Da'i al-Mutlaq (1591–1612)

== See also ==
- Category:Lists of religious leaders by century
- Religious leaders by year
- List of state leaders in the 16th century
- List of governors of dependent territories in the 16th century
