= Thomas Lancaster =

English Protestant clergyman

The Right Reverend Thomas Lancaster
- Archbishop of Armagh; Primate of All Ireland
- Church: Church of Ireland
- Archdiocese: Armagh
- Appointed: 12 March 1568
- In office: 1568-1583
- Predecessor: Adam Loftus
- Successor: John Longe

Orders
- Consecration: 13 June 1568 by Adam Loftus

Personal details
- Died: December 1583 Drogheda, Ireland
- Denomination: Anglican
- Children: 3

Thomas Lancaster (died 1583) was an English Protestant clergyman, Church of Ireland Archbishop of Armagh from 1568.

== Life ==
He was perhaps a native of Cumberland, and was probably educated at Oxford. On 11 July 1550 he was consecrated Bishop of Kildare by George Browne, Archbishop of Dublin. An evangelical Protestant, he attended the conference in June 1551 which Sir James Croft, Lord Deputy of Ireland, held at Dublin with George Dowdall, the Primate of Ireland and a Roman Catholic. In 1552, Lancaster was installed in the deanery of Ossory, which he held in commendam with his bishopric. On 2 February 1553, he assisted in the consecration of John Bale as Bishop of Ossory; and about the same time he published a statement of his doctrinal position; it is dedicated to Edward VI. Lancaster's style of argument resembles Bale's.

Lancaster was married, and on that ground, he was deprived of both his preferments by Queen Mary in 1554, and spent the remainder of her reign in retirement. In 1559 he was presented by the Crown to the treasurership of Salisbury Cathedral, in succession to Thomas Harding; and he also became one of the royal chaplains. He was a member of the lower house of the Convocation of 1563, and on 5 February 1563 was in the minority of 58 who approved of the proposed six formulas committing the Church of England to ultra-Protestant doctrine and practices, as against 59 who opposed the change. In the same year, he signed the petition of the lower house of convocation for reform of church discipline. He acted as suffragan bishop of Marlborough under Bishop John Jewel, but the dates are not known. In that capacity, he held ordinations at Salisbury on 13 April 1560 and 26 April 1568. Writing to Archbishop Matthew Parker (8 May 1568) Jewel complained of Lancaster's want of discretion. Lancaster was also elected Principal of St Edmund Hall, Oxford in early 1565.

When Sir Henry Sydney went to Ireland as Lord Deputy in October 1565, Lancaster had a royal licence to attend him and absent himself from his spiritual offices. He accompanied Sydney in his progress through various parts of Ireland. Sir William Cecil was friendly with him, and wrote to Sidney on 22 July 1567 that Lancaster was to be made Archbishop of Armagh, in succession to Adam Loftus, who had been translated to Dublin. Some months passed before the choice was officially announced, but on 28 March 1568 Queen Elizabeth informed the Irish Lords Justices. His consecration took place, at the hands of Archbishop Loftus of Dublin, Hugh Brady, Bishop of Meath, and Robert Daly, Bishop of Kildare, on 13 June 1568, in Christ Church Cathedral, Dublin. He preached his own consecration sermon on the subject of 'Regeneration.' The archbishop had licence to hold sundry preferments, both in England and in Ireland, on account of the poverty of his see, which had been wasted by rebellion. Due to the paucity of his See he was also in commendam Archdeacon of Kells, Rector of Nobber and Prebend of St Patrick's Cathedral, Dublin He died in Drogheda in December 1583, and was buried in St. Peter's Church in the town, in the vault of one of his predecessors, Octavian De Spinellis (died 1513). He left a son and two daughters. His will was disputed and the intended foundation of a public grammar school at Drogheda, to be endowed at his cost, and eight scholarships for it at St Edmund Hall, Oxford, came to nothing.
