= John Longe =

Church of Ireland Archbishop of Armagh

The Right Reverend John Longe
- Archbishop of Armagh; Primate of All Ireland
- Church: Church of Ireland
- Archdiocese: Armagh
- Appointed: 7 July 1584
- In office: 1584-1589
- Predecessor: Thomas Lancaster
- Successor: John Garvey

Orders
- Consecration: 13 July 1584

Personal details
- Died: 1589 Drogheda, Ireland
- Denomination: Anglican

John Longe (1548–1589) was an English-born Church of Ireland archbishop of Armagh. He had a fondness for good living, which caused him to run up massive debts, but was also noted for his literary tastes.

== Life ==
He was born in London; little seems to be known of his parents or his family background. He was educated at Eton College where he was a King's Scholar. He later attended King's College, Cambridge, where he was admitted a scholar on 13 August 1564; there is no record that he took a degree.

After taking holy orders and holding many livings in England, he was promoted, from what was described as "a position of utter obscurity", to the see of Armagh and primacy of all Ireland in July 1584, on the nomination of Sir John Perrot, Lord Deputy of Ireland, but against the inclination of Elizabeth I, who had a poor opinion of him. He seems to have done little to improve the abject condition of the Church of Ireland, although he was fully aware of it, remarking that he doubted that there were even forty Irish-born Protestants in the whole country. A plan to strictly enforce the laws against recusants was vetoed by the Queen personally: she pointed out that by his own account, the vast majority of the population was Roman Catholic, and doubted that any good would come from provoking them.

He moved in literary circles, being a friend of Edmund Spenser and Lodowick Bryskett. Bryskett recalled that he was present at Bryskett's cottage near Dublin on a well-known occasion in the late 1580s where Spenser confided to his friends that he had begun work on The Faerie Queene.

He was, rather belatedly, made a member of the Irish Privy Council in 1585 (the delay was apparently due to the Queen's low opinion of him). He died at Drogheda in 1589, being buried in Primate Octavian's vault at St Peter's Church, Drogheda. Lord Deputy William Fitzwilliam, in a letter dated 12 February 1589, to William Lyon, Bishop of Cork, remarked that he "loved good cheer but too well". Due to his extravagant lifestyle, and the fact that his episcopal see produced little in the way of profit (the Queen had forbidden him to hold any other living in plurality), he accumulated very heavy debts, including one of £1000 to the Crown. At one point he was accused of resorting to forgery to supplement his income. His widow Anne petitioned Fitzwilliam for redress for herself and her children, complaining that her husband's goods had been seized by the Crown to satisfy Longe's debts, despite his being "a good and faithful counsellor at this Board (i.e. the Irish Privy Council)". Although Fitzwilliam evidently did not share this high opinion of the Archbishop's services to the Crown, Anne's petition was granted, and the debt, despite its size, was written off.
