= John Alen =

English priest and canon lawyer

The Most Reverend John Alen LL.D.
- Archbishop of Dublin; Primate of Ireland
- Church: Roman Catholic
- Archdiocese: Dublin
- Appointed: 3 September 1529
- In office: 1529-1534
- Predecessor: Hugh Inge
- Successor: George Browne
- Other post: Lord Chancellor of Ireland

Orders
- Ordination: 25 August 1499
- Consecration: 13 March 1530

Personal details
- Born: 1476 Coltishall, Norfolk, England
- Died: 28 July 1534 (aged 57–58) Clontarf, Dublin, Ireland

John Alen (1476 – 28 July 1534) was an English priest and canon lawyer, whose later years were spent in Ireland. He held office as Archbishop of Dublin and Lord Chancellor of Ireland, and was a member of the Privy Council of Ireland. In the latter office, for a few years, he played a central role in the government of Ireland.

He was murdered during the Rebellion of "Silken Thomas" Fitzgerald, 10th Earl of Kildare, who is said to have wrongly believed that Alen had been responsible for the death of Thomas's father, the 9th Earl of Kildare, who had in fact died a natural death. Despite his grievance against the archbishop, Thomas always maintained that he had intended to spare Alen's life but that his order (delivered in Irish) to "take him away" had been misinterpreted by his followers as a command to kill him.

== Life ==
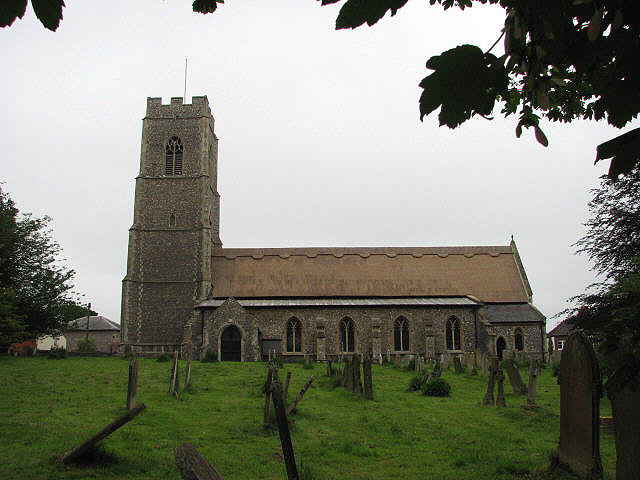
Coltishall, Norfolk, birthplace of the Archbishop

He was born in Coltishall, Norfolk, son of Edward Alan and Catherine St. Leger, daughter of Sir John St. Leger. The Alans were a numerous clan and six of his cousins settled in Ireland, including his namesake John Alan, who was Lord Chancellor of Ireland in his turn, William Alen, ancestor of the Alen Baronets of St. Wolstan's, and Thomas Alen of Kilteel, who held office as Clerk of the Crown and Hanaper. He was educated at Oxford and Cambridge, graduated in the latter place, and spent some years in Italy, partly at Rome, for studies and for a business of Archbishop Warham of Canterbury. He was ordained as a priest on 25 August 1499, and held various parochial benefices until 1522, about which time he attracted the attention of Cardinal Wolsey, whose helpful commissary he was in the matter of the suppression of the minor monasteries. As such, his conduct, says James Gairdner, "gave rise to a considerable outcry, and complaints were made about it to the king".

He continued to receive ecclesiastical advancement, and assisted Wolsey in his legatine functions, among other things in the suit instituted by the cardinal against Henry VIII in May 1527, by which it was sought at first to have the marriage with Catharine of Aragon declared invalid without her knowledge. In the summer of the same year he accompanied the cardinal on his mission to France, and finally (August 1528) was rewarded with the archepiscopal see of Dublin.

Soon after his arrival, he was invested with the Chancellorship. For a short time until Wolsey's downfall, Alen was a dominant figure in the Irish administration, forming one of an "inner council of three" on the Privy Council of Ireland. In 1532, Alan was relieved of the office of Chancellor through the influence of Gerald FitzGerald, 9th Earl of Kildare.

He was relieved from asserting, against George Cromer, Archbishop of Armagh, the legatine authority of Wolsey by the latter's fall (October 1529). With the rest of the English clergy he had to pay a heavy fine (1531) for violation of the Statutes of Provisors and Praemunire, in recognizing the legatine authority of Wolsey, then, in the king's eyes, a heinous crime, and a reason for the cardinal's indictment. Alen survived Wolsey's downfall, but his political influence was never the same again.

== Silken Thomas ==
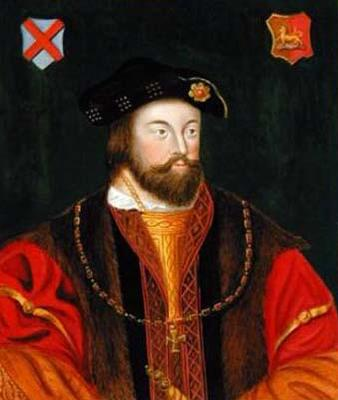
Silken Thomas

As a former follower of Wolsey, he was hated by the followers of the great Irish house of Kildare (the FitzGeralds), whose chief, Gerald FitzGerald, 9th Earl of Kildare, had been imprisoned by Wolsey in the Tower of London from 1526 to 1530, and again, by the King, early in 1534. Soon a false rumour spread through Ireland that the earl had been put to death, and Earl Gerald's son, "Silken Thomas", rose in revolt in 1534.

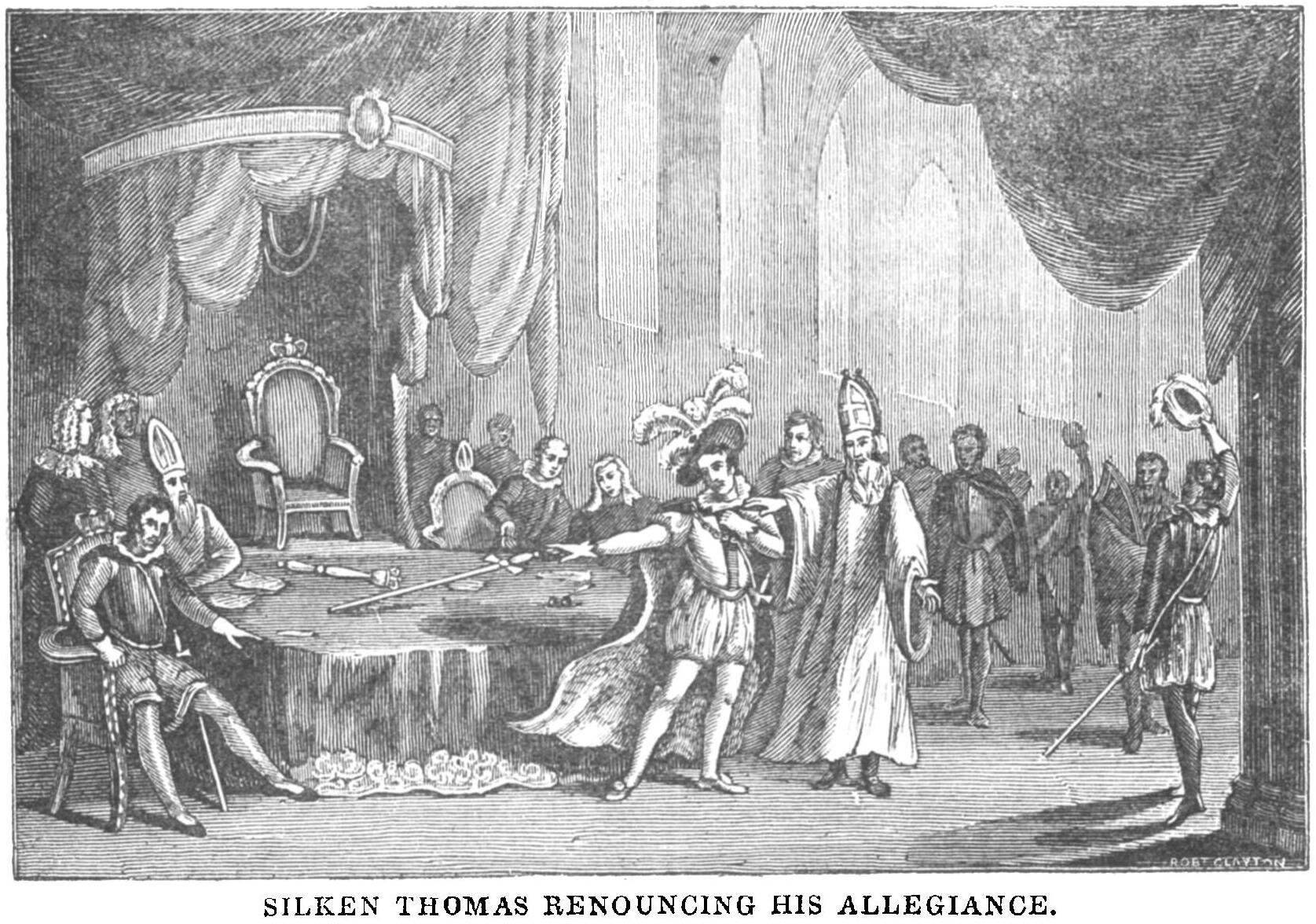
Silken Thomas renouncing his allegiance

Summoned by the council to St. Mary's Abbey, Dublin, on 11 June 1534, Silken Thomas accompanied by 140 armoured gallowglasses with silk fringes on their helmets (from which he got his nickname), rode to the abbey and publicly renounced his allegiance to his cousin King Henry VIII, Lord of Ireland.

The Chancellor, Archbishop John Alen, attempted to persuade him not to commit himself to such a rash proceeding; but the young lord's harper, understanding only Irish, and seeing signs of wavering in FitzGerald's bearing, commenced to recite a poem in praise of the deeds of his ancestors, telling him at the same time that he lingered there over long. Roused by this he threw down the sword of state and rushed from the hall, followed by his adherents. The council then sent an order for Thomas's immediate arrest to the Lord Mayor of Dublin.

== Murder ==
The Archbishop, anticipating a siege of Dublin Castle, attempted to escape to England. He embarked at Dame Gate, but his boat was driven ashore at Clontarf. He fled for refuge to the home of his friend Thomas St. Lawrence at Artane Castle near Dublin, but his hiding place was betrayed. Lord Thomas arrived before the house in hot pursuit of him. The Archbishop was dragged out in his shirt, and, falling on his knees, begged for mercy. Archbishop Alen was killed by two retainers of "Silken Thomas" Fitzgerald, John Teeling and Nicholas Wafer, at Artane Castle, on 28 July 1534. Whether Silken Thomas actually ordered the killing or not remains a subject of dispute: there is a well-known tradition that Teeling and Wafer misunderstood his command in Gaelic to "take this fellow away" as a command to murder him. (Note: James Gairdner in the DNB wrote "The archbishop knelt before [Lord Thomas] in his shirt and mantle, entreating for mercy. But the followers of Lord Thomas, mistaking, as some say, an order from their master, which was simply to take him away and put him in confinement, butchered him and most of his attendants without remorse" (Gairdner 1885, p. 306).) Lord Thomas subsequently insisted that he meant only that the Archbishop should be removed to custody. He afterwards sent his chaplain to Rome to obtain absolution for him from the excommunication incurred by this murder.

== Character ==
Sir James Ware says of Alen that "he was of a turbulent spirit, but a man of hospitality and learning, and a diligent inquirer into antiquities".

== Works ==
Alen wrote a treatise on the pallium, Epistola de pallii significatione activa et passiva on the occasion of his reception of this pontifical symbol, and another De consuetudinibus ac statutis in tutoriis causis observandis. He seems also to have been a man of methodical habits, for in the archives of the Anglican archdiocese of Dublin are still preserved two important registers made by his order, the Liber Niger, or Black Book, and the Repertorium Viride, or Green Repertory, both so called, after the custom of the age, from the colour of the binding. The former is a chartularium of the archdiocese, or collection of its most important documents, and the latter is a list of the parishes of the see as it was in 1530.

== Notes ==
Catholic Church titles
Preceded by Hugh Inge	Archbishop of Dublin; 1528–1534	Succeeded by George Browne as Anglican Archbishop (1536)
Preceded by Hugh Inge	Archbishop of Dublin; 1528–1534	Succeeded by Hugh Curwen as Catholic Archbishop (1555)
