= Ian Ellis =

Anglican bishop

The Right Reverend Ian Ellis
- Bishop of Clogher
- Church: Church of Ireland
- Elected: 9 November 2020
- In office: 2021 – present
- Predecessor: John McDowell

Orders
- Ordination: 1990
- Consecration: 26 April 2021 by John McDowell

Personal details
- Born: Ian William Ellis; 1957 (age 68–69)
- Denomination: Anglicanism
- Spouse: Heather
- Children: 3
- Profession: Priest, formerly Physics teacher
- Education: Queen's University Belfast; Trinity College Dublin; Church of Ireland Theological Institute

Ian William Ellis (born 1957) is an Anglican bishop and the current Church of Ireland Bishop of Clogher.

== Life ==
Ellis was educated at Queen's University Belfast, Trinity College Dublin and the Church of Ireland Theological College.

Ellis was ordained in 1990. He initially served as Curate of St Mark, Armagh. After that he was the incumbent at Loughgall from 1991 to 1992. He was then Secretary to the Church’s Board of Education from 2002 until 2015. From then until his election as bishop he was at Rossory, where he also served the wider church in a number of roles.

S-rel
| Preceded by John McDowell | Bishop of Clogher; 2021 | Incumbent |
