= Hugh Goodacre =

English clergyman

The Right Reverend Hugh Goodacre
- Archbishop of Armagh; Primate of All Ireland
- Church: Church of Ireland
- Archdiocese: Armagh
- Appointed: 28 October 1552
- In office: 1552–1553
- Predecessor: George Dowdall
- Successor: George Dowdall

Orders
- Consecration: 2 February 1553 by George Browne

Personal details
- Died: 1 May 1553 Dublin, Ireland

Hugh Goodacre (died 1 May 1553) was an English Protestant clergyman, who was briefly Church of Ireland Archbishop of Armagh and Primate of Ireland.

== Life ==
Nothing is known for certain of his family background or his early life. He was vicar of Shalfleet, Isle of Wight, and chaplain to John Ponet, Bishop of Winchester. According to John Strype he was at first chaplain to Princess Elizabeth, who about 1548 or 1549 procured him a licence to preach from Edward Seymour, 1st Duke of Somerset, the Lord Protector, recommending him in a letter to William Cecil.

When Archbishop George Dowdall, who was opposed to the Protestant Reformation, retired from Armagh in 1552, Thomas Cranmer recommended Goodacre to Edward VI for the vacant see as 'a wise and well-learned man', and he was appointed by a letter under the privy seal dated 28 October 1552. On 2 February 1553 he was consecrated in Christ Church Cathedral, Dublin. He died in Dublin on 1 May of the same year. John Bale voiced the suspicion that he had been poisoned by certain Roman Catholic priests whom he had tried to reform. Strype says he was famed for his preaching; none of his writings were published.
