= Archbishop of Armagh (Church of Ireland) =

Head Of The Church Of Ireland

- Archbishopric

anglican
- Incumbent; John McDowell
- Style: His Grace, The Most Rev'd

Location
- Ecclesiastical province: Armagh and Tuam

Information
- First holder: Saint Patrick
- Established: 445
- Diocese: Diocese of Armagh
- Cathedral: St Patrick's Cathedral, Armagh

Website
- armagh.anglican.org/archbishop

The Anglican archbishop of Armagh is the ecclesiastical head of the Church of Ireland, bearing the title Primate of All Ireland, the metropolitan of the Province of Armagh and the diocesan bishop of the Diocese of Armagh.

The diocese traces its history to Saint Patrick in the 5th century, who founded the See. His current successor is Bishop John McDowell who was enthroned at his cathedra in St Patrick's Cathedral in Armagh on 28 April 2020 and signs as +John ARMAGH.

== History ==
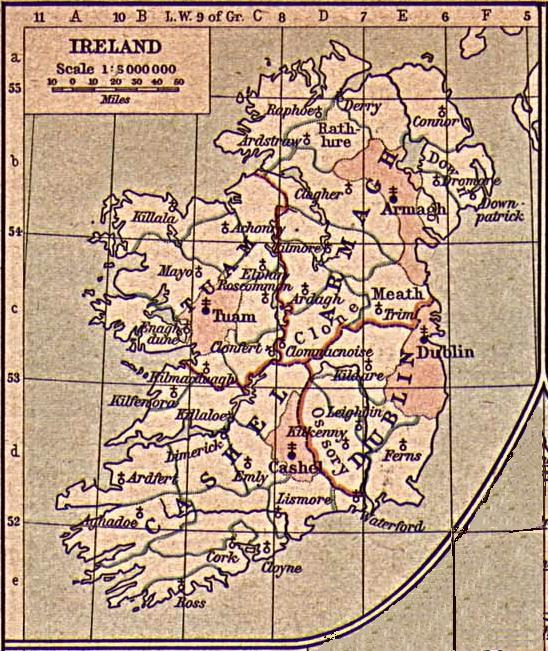
Maps of dioceses in Ireland as defined by the synod of Kells. From Historical Atlas by William R. Shepherd.

Saint Patrick, having received some grants of land from the chieftain Daire, on the hill called Ard-Macha (the Height of Macha), built a stone church on the summit and a monastery and some other religious edifices round about, and fixed on this place for his metropolitan see. In Irish times, the primacy of Armagh was questioned only by the great southern centre of the Irish Church, at Cashel. Brian Boru recognised the supremacy of Armagh, possibly in a political move to gain support from Armagh for Boru's claim to the High Kingship. Another noteworthy incumbent was St. Malachy O'Morgair (1134–37), who suffered many tribulations in trying to effect a reformation in the diocese. St. Malachy is honoured as the patron saint of the diocese. When the English kings got a footing in the country, they began to intervene in the election of bishops. They also began to claim possession of the temporalities of the sees during vacancies, and to insist on the newly elected bishops suing them humbly for their restitution.

=== Irish Reformation ===
During the reign of Henry VIII, George Dowdall, a zealous supporter of the king, had been elevated into the See of Armagh by that monarch, but on the introduction of the Book of Common Prayer in the reign of Edward VI, he left the kingdom in disgust. Thereupon the king in 1552, appointed Hugh Goodacre to the see. He survived his consecration only three months. In the beginning of the reign of Mary I, Dowdall was again appointed to the see on account of the great zeal he had shown against Protestantism. Adam Loftus (1563–67), from whom the Church of Ireland hierarchy derive their orders, was consecrated by Hugh Curwin, Archbishop of Dublin.

=== Later primates ===
A most learned primate was James Ussher (1625–56), whose most important works were "Veterum Epistolarum Hibernicarum Sylloge", published in 1632, and "Brittanicarum Ecclesiarum Antiquitates", which appeared in 1639. He left his valuable library, comprising several thousand printed books and manuscripts, to Trinity College, Dublin, and his complete works were published by that institution in twenty-four volumes. His judgment against toleration of Roman Catholics, i.e. "to consent that they may freely exercise their religion and profess their faith and doctrine is a grievous sin", was a signal for the renewal of persecution and led to the Rising of the Irish Catholics in 1641.

John Bramhall (1660–63), another learned divine, succeeded Ussher. His works on polemic and other subjects have been published in four folio volumes. Narcissus Marsh (1702–13), another learned prelate, built the noble library in Dublin which bears his name, filled it with a valuable collection of theological and Oriental works and liberally endowed it for the support of a librarian and deputy. Richard Robinson (1765–94) raised Armagh by his munificence from extreme decay to a state of opulence and embellished it with various useful public institutions. He built an episcopal headquarters, a public library, an infirmary, and an observatory.

Lord John George Beresford (1822–62) was also distinguished by his munificence. He restored Armagh Cathedral and is said to have spent £280,000 in acts of public benevolence. On his successor, Marcus Gervais Beresford (1862–65), fell a large portion of the task of providing for the future organization and sustentation of the Church of Ireland, which was disestablished from 1 January 1871. Prior to the disestablishment of the Church of Ireland in 1871, the Church of Ireland Archbishop of Armagh was entitled to sit in the House of Lords as a Lord Spiritual, along with the other archbishops in rotation.

== Basic list of archbishops ==
Notable archbishops include:

- George Cromer (1521–1543)
- George Dowdall (1543–1552)
- Hugh Goodacre (1552–1553)
- George Dowdall (again) (1553–1558)
- See vacant (1558–1562)
- Adam Loftus (1562–1567)
- Thomas Lancaster (1568–1584)
- John Long (1584–1589)
- John Garvey (1589–1595)
- Henry Ussher (1595–1613)
- Christopher Hampton (1613–1625)
- James Ussher (1625–1656)
- See vacant (1656–1661)
- John Bramhall (1660–1663)
- James Margetson (1663–1678)
- Michael Boyle (1679–1702)
- Narcissus Marsh (1703–1713)
- Thomas Lindsay (1713–1724)
- Hugh Boulter (1724–1742)
- John Hoadly (1742–1746)
- George Stone (1747–1764)
- Richard Robinson (later the Lord Rokeby) (1765–1794)
- William Newcome (1795–1800)
- William Stuart (1800–1822)
- Lord John Beresford (1822–1862)
- Marcus Beresford (1862–1885)
- Robert Knox (1886–1893)
- Robert Gregg (1893–1896)
- William Alexander (1896–1911)
- John Crozier (1911–1920)
- Charles D'Arcy (1920–1938)
- Godfrey Day (1938–1938)
- John Gregg (1939–1959)
- James McCann (1959–1969)
- George Simms (1969–1980)
- John Armstrong (1980–1986)
- Robin Eames (1986–2006)
- Alan Harper (2007–2012)
- Richard Clarke (2012–February 2020)
- John McDowell (April 2020- )

== See also ==
- Roman Catholic Archdiocese of Armagh
