= St Patrick's Cathedral, Armagh (Church of Ireland) =

Medieval Cathedral in Northern Ireland

The Cathedral Church of St Patrick, Armagh
- Cathedral of the Diocese of Armagh and Metropolitan Cathedral of the United Provinces of Armagh and Tuam
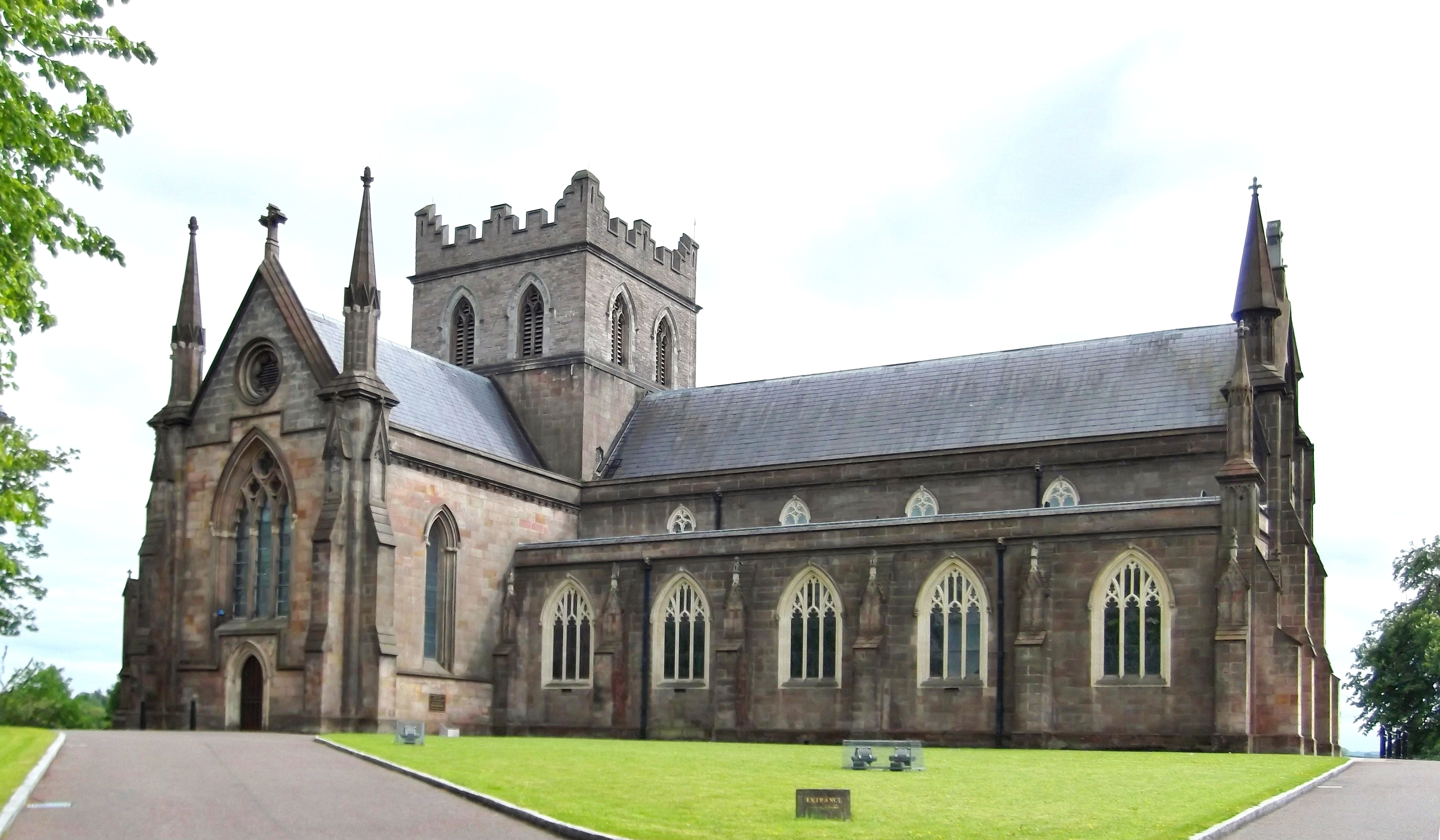

- Location within Northern Ireland
- 54.3478°N 6.6562°W
- Address: Abbey Street, Armagh
- Country: Northern Ireland
- Denomination: Church of Ireland
- Previous denomination: Roman Catholic
- Website: stpatricks-cathedral.org

History
- Founded: AD 445
- Founder: Saint Patrick
- Dedication: Saint Patrick
- Consecrated: AD 445

Administration
- Province: Armagh
- Diocese: Armagh

Clergy
- Archbishop: The Most Reverend John McDowell
- Dean: The Very Reverend Shane Forster The Venerable Elizabeth Cairns (Archdeacon of Ardboe). Prebendary of Loughgall: The Reverend Canon Andrew Totten O.B.E. Prebendary of Tynan: The Reverend Canon Colin Darling. Prebendary of Ballymore: The Reverend Gary McMurray.

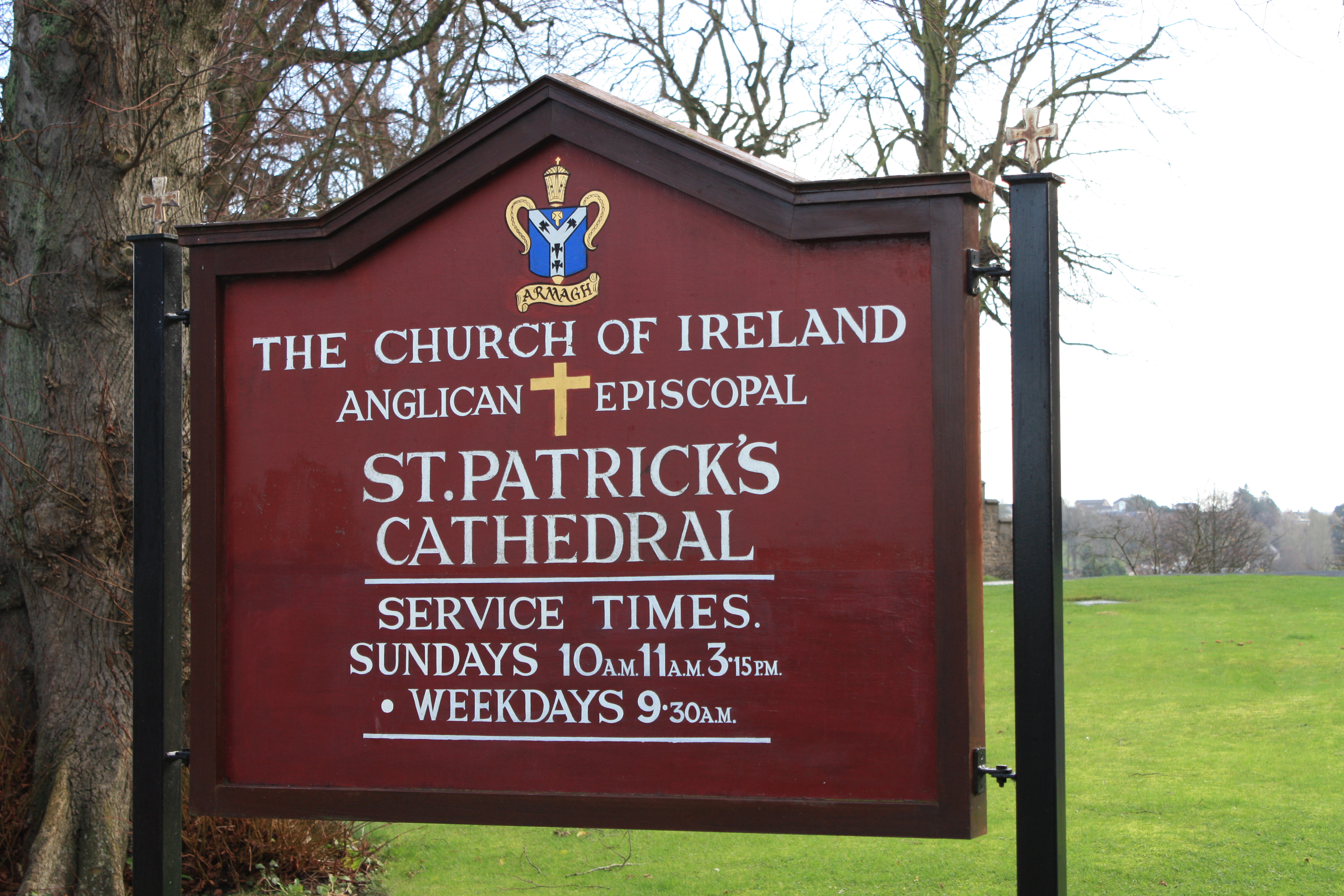
St Patrick's Cathedral sign, November 2009

St Patrick's Cathedral is a Church of Ireland cathedral in Armagh, Northern Ireland. It is the seat of the Anglican Archbishop of Armagh and Diocese of Armagh. The origins of the site are as a 5th-century Irish stone monastery, said to have been founded by St. Patrick. Throughout the Middle Ages, the cathedral was the seat of the Catholic Archbishop of Armagh, head of the Catholic Church in Ireland, and one of the most important churches in Gaelic Ireland. With the 16th-century Protestant Reformation, the cathedral was retained by the Protestant Church of Ireland. It is one of two Anglican churches in Armagh City, with the other being St Mark's Parish Church.

Following Roman Catholic emancipation in the 19th century, a new Roman Catholic cathedral was built in Armagh, also called St Patrick's Cathedral.

== History ==
=== Early history of the site ===
Before the Reformation, the cathedral had been the ecclesiastical capital of the Roman Catholic Church in Ireland. According to tradition, a church was founded on the site in 445 by Saint Patrick. Evidence suggests that the hilltop was originally a pagan sanctuary.

By the 7th century, it had become the most important monastery and monastic school in the north of Ireland, and monastic settlement grew up around it.

Brian Boru, High King of Ireland, visited Armagh in 1004, acknowledging it as the head cathedral of Ireland and bestowing it a large sum of gold. Brian was buried at Armagh cathedral after his death at the Battle of Clontarf in 1014. Armagh's claim to the primacy of Ireland was formally acknowledged at the Synod of Ráth Breasail in 1111.

The church itself was partially destroyed and rebuilt 17 times. It was renovated and restored under Dean Eoghan McCawell (1505–1549), having suffered from a devastating fire in 1511 and being in poor shape. Soon after his death the cathedral was described by Lord Chancellor Cusack as "one of the fairest and best churches in Ireland". However, by the end of the Nine Years' War in 1603, Armagh lay in ruins.

The cathedral and its assets became part of the Established Protestant Church, the Church of Ireland, as part of the Reformation. It has remained Anglican since the reign of Queen Elizabeth I of England and Ireland.

=== Modern history ===
Following the Nine Years' War, Armagh came under English control and the town began to be settled by Protestants from Britain, as part of the Plantation of Ulster. During the Irish Rebellion of 1641, many Protestant settlers fled to Armagh cathedral for safety. After negotiations with the besieged settlers, Catholic rebels occupied the town until May 1642.

The cathedral was substantially rebuilt between 1834 and 1840 by Archbishop Lord John George Beresford and the architect Lewis Nockalls Cottingham. The fabric remains that of the mediaeval building but much restored. While Cottingham was heavy-handed in his restoration, the researches of T. G. F. Patterson and Janet Myles in the late twentieth century have shown the restoration to have been notably antiquarian for its time. The tracery of the nave windows in particular are careful restorations as is the copy of the font. The capital decoration of the two westernmost pillars of the nave (either side of the West Door internal porch) are mediaeval as are the bulk of the external gargoyle carvings (some resited) of the parapet of the Eastern Arm. Cottingham's intention of retaining the richly cusped West Door with flanking canopied niches was over-ruled. Subsequent restorations have more radically altered the internal proportions of the mediaeval building, proportions which Cottingham had retained.

Many other Celtic and mediaeval carvings are to be seen within the cathedral which is also rich in eighteenth- and nineteenth-century sculpture. There are works by Francis Leggatt Chantrey, Louis-François Roubiliac, John Michael Rysbrack, Carlo Marochetti and others.

The Choral Foundation, dating from the Culdees, and refounded as the Royal College of King Charles of Vicars Choral and Organist in the cathedral of Armagh, continues to the present. There are generally a dozen Gentlemen of the Lay Vicars Choral and sixteen boy choristers.

The Maundy Money was distributed at the cathedral in 2008: a plaque in the south aisle commemorates this event.

== Notable burials ==
- Brian Boru (c. 942–1014), High King of Ireland
- Saint Ethnea, baptised by St Patrick, died around 433 A.D.; her Feast Day is 11 January
- Marcus Gervais Beresford (1801–1885), Archbishop of Armagh and Primate of All Ireland (appointed 1862). Cousin of Lord John Beresford
- Charles Frederick D'Arcy (1859–1938), Archbishop of Armagh and Primate of All Ireland
- Lord John Beresford (1773–1862), Archbishop of Armagh and Primate of All Ireland
- John Baptist Crozier (1853–1920), Archbishop of Armagh and Primate of All Ireland and his wife Alice Isabella

== Organists ==
- 1634 Richard Galway
- 1661 John Hawkshaw
- 1695 Robert Hodge
- 1711 William Toole
- 1722 Samuel Bettridge
- 1752 John Woffington
- 1759 Robert Barnes
- 1776 Langrishe Doyle
- 1782 Richard Langdon
- 1794 John Clarke Whitfield
- 1797 John Jones
- 1816 Frederick Horncastle
- 1823 Robert Turle
- 1872 Thomas Marks
- 1917 G. H. P. Hewson
- 1920 Edred Chaundy
- 1935 Reginald West
- 1951 Frederick Carter
- 1966 Christopher Phelps
- 1968 Martin White
- 2002–2015 Theo Saunders
- 2015–present Stephen Timpany

== See also ==
- Dean of Armagh, a list of deans
- List of cathedrals in Ireland
- St Patrick's Cathedral, Armagh (Roman Catholic)
- List of tourist attractions in Ireland
