= Robert Wauchope (bishop) =

Robert Wauchope (c. 1500 – 1551) was a Scots-born cleric, who was the Roman Catholic Archbishop of Armagh from 1539 to 1551.

== Biography ==
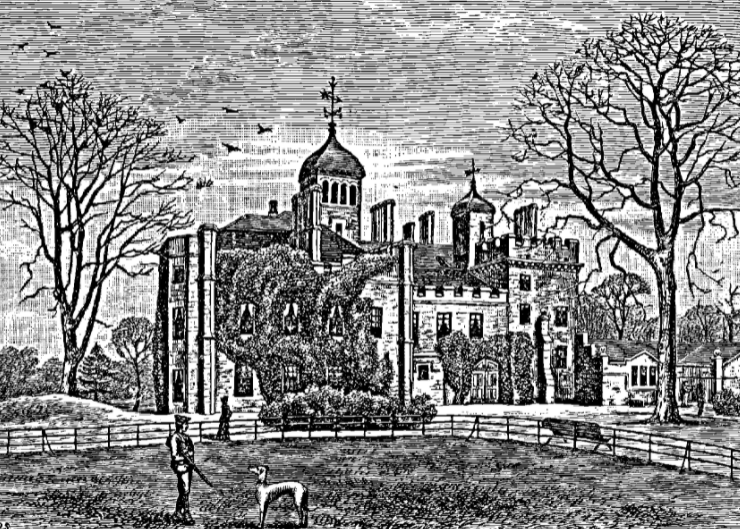
Niddrie Marischal near Edinburgh, the Wauchope family home

He was born at Nidrie Marischal near Edinburgh, Scotland, son of Gilbert Wauchope, who was the head of the family which owned Niddrie Marischal for several centuries. Robert is known to have been nearly blind from an early age (there are conflicting accounts of precisely how bad his eyesight was), yet he somehow overcame this handicap and became an outstanding scholar. He is recorded as studying at the University of Paris in 1526, and also studied for a time with Hector Boece at King's College, Aberdeen. He was a friend of Erasmus.

He was considered one of the best theologians of his day, taking a prominent role at the conference at Worms in 1540 and the Diet of Ratisbon in 1541. He also attended the early sessions of the Council of Trent. Pius IV relied heavily on his advice.

Wauchope worked as a theologian in Rome, and was probably not consecrated until the death of his predecessor in the See of Armagh, George Cromer, in 1543. Cromer was suspected of heresy by the Holy See, and was deposed by Henry VIII during the Protestant Reformation. The King appointed George Dowdall to the See, and Dowdall denounced Wauchope when he arrived in Ireland. Wauchope returned to Rome where he was made legate to Ireland, but he died soon afterwards, before he could return to Ireland to reclaim the Archdiocese.

| Preceded by George Cromer | Archbishop of Armagh; 1539 – 1551 | Succeeded by Vacant |
