= John McDowell (bishop) =

Anglican bishop (born 1956)

The Most Reverend John McDowell
- Archbishop of Armagh; Primate of All Ireland
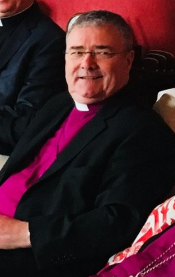
- Church: Church of Ireland
- Elected: 8 March 2020
- In office: 28 April 2020 – present
- Predecessor: Richard Clarke
- Other post: Bishop of Clogher (2011–2020)

Orders
- Ordination: 1996
- Consecration: 23 September 2011 by Alan Harper

Personal details
- Born: Francis John McDowell; 1956 (age 69–70) Belfast, Northern Ireland
- Denomination: Anglicanism
- Spouse: Mary
- Children: Dorothy
- Profession: Businessman
- Education: Queen's University Belfast; London School of Economics; Trinity College, Dublin

Francis John McDowell (born 1956) is an Anglican bishop, who is the current Church of Ireland Archbishop of Armagh and Primate of All Ireland.

== Early life and education ==
McDowell was born in 1956 and was educated at Annadale Grammar School, an all-boys grammar school in south Belfast, Northern Ireland. He studied history at Queen's University Belfast, graduating with a Bachelor of Arts (BA) degree. He also holds a diploma in business studies from the London School of Economics and a Bachelor of Theology (BTh) degree in theology and biblical studies from Trinity College Dublin. He pursued a career in business before being ordained in 1996.

== Ordained ministry ==
McDowell was ordained in 1996. He initially served as Curate of Antrim, in the Diocese of Connor (1996–1999), and subsequently Rector of Ballyrashane, in the same diocese (1999–2002), and Rector of St Mark's Church, Dundela, in the Diocese of Down and Dromore (2002–2011), during which time he was also an Honorary Secretary of the General Synod (2008–2011).

=== Episcopal ministry ===
He was appointed Bishop of Clogher by the House of Bishops on 30 May 2011; and consecrated on 23 September that year in St Macartin's Cathedral, Enniskillen.

McDowell was elected Church of Ireland Archbishop of Armagh and Primate of All Ireland in 2020 and took up his role on 28 April of that year. On 14 September 2021, he was enthroned during a service at St Patrick's Cathedral, Armagh.

Anglican Communion titles
Preceded by Michael Jackson	Bishop of Clogher; 2011–2020	Ian Ellis
Preceded by Richard Clarke	Archbishop of Armagh; 2020–present	Incumbent
