= George Dowdall =

Irish cleric

The Right Reverend George Dowdall
- Archbishop of Armagh; Primate of All Ireland
- Church: Roman Catholic
- Archdiocese: Armagh
- In office: 1543–1551; 1553–1558
- Predecessor: George Cromer
- Successor: Hugh Goodacre; Adam Loftus

Orders
- Consecration: December 1543 by Edward Staples

Personal details
- Born: 1487
- Died: 15 August 1558 (aged 70–71) London, England

George Dowdall (1487 – 15 August 1558) was a sixteenth-century Irish cleric, who was twice Archbishop of Armagh.

== Biography ==
Dowdall was born in Drogheda, the son of Edward Dowdall. The Dowdall family came to Ireland from Dovedale in Derbyshire in the thirteenth century and settled in County Louth. Several members of the family became distinguished lawyers and judges. George had at least one brother, Christopher, who married Thomasine Cusack, a member of the prominent Cusack family of Cussington, County Meath. Christopher was the father of James Dowdall, who became Lord Chief Justice of Ireland.

George entered the Order of the Brethren of the Cross (colloquially known as the Crutched Friars or Crouched Friars due to the crutch-like staffs which they carried) at an early age and became the last Prior of their house at Ardee.

He was appointed Primate of All Ireland by Henry VIII in 1543 to succeed George Cromer. However, his appointment was not recognised by the Pope, who had earlier replaced Cromer with Robert Wauchope. Dowdall accepted Henry's position as Supreme Head on Earth of the Church of Ireland, but like Henry, he took an anti-Protestant theological position. This position became unsustainable in the reign of Edward VI. Dowdall would not accept the new liturgy, and in 1552 he withdrew to a monastery in Brabant, and was replaced by Hugh Goodacre. By this stage, Wauchope had died without being replaced. Dowdall was deprived of his Primacy, but was not formally deposed as Archbishop.

With Mary I's accession in 1553, and the re-establishment of Roman Catholicism in Ireland, Dowall was reappointed to the see of Armagh, this time with the Pope's approval, and he held the position until his death, some three months before Mary's. He was energetic in attempting to undo the effects of the Reformation, holding two provincial synods at Drogheda to restore the constitution of the pre-Reformation Church. He was particularly zealous in depriving married clergy of their livings, and as a result was accused of taking the opportunity to persecute his personal enemies, such as George Browne, Archbishop of Dublin. He was made a member of the Privy Council of Ireland. He died in London while on official business there.

He was noted from an early age for gravity of character and learning, but also for his "high stomach" (pride). Despite his reputation for learning, he left very few published works.

== See also ==
- Dowdall family name
- Henry VIII and the English Reformation
