= Bachal Isu =

Irish Christian relic

The Bachal Isu (from Latin baculus Iesu, "Staff of Jesus") was a Christian relic. According to legend, Saint Patrick brought his celebrated golden Crozier, which was consistently identified with the Staff Of Jesus, along with his Book of Gospels, known as the Book of Armagh, to Armagh Cathedral in Ulster which he had recently founded.

According to tradition, the staff was given to Saint Patrick by a hermit on an island located in the Etruscan Sea, who had received it from Jesus Christ. Jesus informed the hermit to give it to Saint Patrick when he inevitably arrived.

== From Armagh to Dublin via Ballyboughal ==
In 1106, when the head or coarb of the see of Armagh had been handed from layman to layman of the Ui Sinaich family, Celsus (Ceallach or Ceallach) became the eighth in line. He wanted to end that tradition of lay control of the episcopal see, and so he became first a priest and then was consecrated a bishop, becoming Archbishop of Armagh. He assumed his right to this position as a bishop, but renounced his right to it as a layman. Fearing that his relatives would try to displace him and take away the attributes of his power, he brought the Bachal Isu to Ballyboughal around 1113. When Celsus died in 1129, he named an Archbishop not related to him. His choice: Maelmhaedhoc O'Morgair, the eventual St. Malachy. He also send Malachy the Bachal Isu, but it was seized by Morrough, a cousin of Celsus, who turned the staff over to Flann Ui Sinaich for safe-keeping, preventing Malachy from assuming his position. Morrough died in 1134 and was succeeded as lay lord of Armagh by Celsus's brother Niall, but his own family now saw "the degradation and disgrace brought upon the diocese by this lay claim" and drove out Niall. In 1135 Flann Ui Sinaich died, and St. Malachy was able to purchase the Bachal Isu from his successor and to retrieve it on 7 July of that year from a cave where it had been hidden away, becoming finally archbishop. In 1137, Malachy resigned his archbishopric to Gelasius, who apparently returned the Bachal Isu to Ballyboughal, where in 1113 Bishop Samuel U h-Aingli had set aside land for the preservation and protection of the staff. In 1173, Richard de Clare, 2nd Earl of Pembroke removed the staff from Ballyboughal and sent it to Christ Church Cathedral, Dublin.

The staff remained in Christ Church until the Protestant Reformation.

== Destruction of the Staff ==
In 1538, shortly after the English reconquest, the staff’s golden ornaments and gems were all removed, and the staff was burnt by order of Anglican Archbishop George Browne in Skinners Row outside Christ Church Cathedral, Dublin. The reason was that it was considered a "superstitious relic".

== Beliefs related to the Staff ==
The staff was believed by some to have special powers including:

- A person who possessed both St. Patrick's Book Of The Gospels and the Staff Of Jesus was to be considered the legitimate Archbishop.
- During legal disputes and solemn controversies, the common people would swear on the “staff of St. Patrick, the Bachall Esir,” which meant more to them than swearing on the “Holy Evangelist.” Such people believed lying while swearing upon it would cause great plagues to occur.
