= Edward Staples =

English-born bishop

Edward Staples or Staple (c.1490 – c.1560) was an English born bishop of Meath.

== Life ==
Born probably about 1490, he is said to have been a native of Lincolnshire or Lancashire. He was educated first at Oxford and then at Cambridge, where he graduated B.A. in 1511, and M.A. in 1514. In 1525, he was made canon of Cardinal College, Oxford, and on 9 March 1526, he supplicated for incorporation in Oxford University, and for the degrees B.D. and D.D. About the same time, he was appointed chaplain to Henry VIII. On 7 March 1528, he was presented to the prebend of Wigginton in the collegiate church of Tamworth, but resigned it in the following July, and was appointed master of St. Bartholomew's Hospital, London. He resigned the latter post in July 1532 on being instituted to the vicarage of Thaxted, Essex.

Meanwhile, in 1530, at Henry's request, Pope Clement VII provided Staples to the bishopric of Meath. In that capacity, he took a prominent part in the government of Ireland, and in the strife between the various factions of the official class. In 1534, he was compelled to flee to England during the rebellion of Thomas Fitzgerald, 10th Earl of Kildare ("Silken Thomas"). He returned in the following year, when he and Archbishop George Browne became Henry VIII's principal instruments in introducing the Protestant Reformation into Ireland. His relations with Browne, however, were always hostile. Staples clung to the mass, though he was strongly for the Royal Supremacy, and it was partly owing to his advice that Henry assumed the title of King of Ireland. His quarrel with Browne became such a scandal that on 31 July 1537, Henry wrote to Browne threatening to remove him for his lightness of behaviour and pride, and to Staples censuring his neglect of his ecclesiastical duties. Little effect seems to have been produced, and on one occasion in 1538, while preaching before Browne in Kilmainham church, Staples denounced him as a heretic. This sermon was examined by the Privy Council of Ireland, and both Staples and Browne complained to Thomas Cromwell, but the quarrel was patched up. In 1544, as a reward for his zeal, Staples was allowed to annex the archdeaconry of Kells though he lost the same benefice by 1547.

After Edward VI's accession, Staples's Protestant opinions became more pronounced, On 7 April 1547, he was granted the parsonage of Ardbraccan, and soon after was made judge of faculties. About this time he married, and preached a strong sermon against the mass, which rendered him intensely unpopular in his diocese. In June 1552, in a discussion at St. Mary's Abbey, Dublin, he maintained the Protestant cause against George Dowdall, archbishop of Armagh.

In August 1553, he took part in the proclamation of Queen Mary, but on 29 June 1554, he was deprived on account of his marriage. He remained in his diocese, destitute and disliked, and on 16 December 1558, after Elizabeth's accession, he wrote to William Cecil relating his woes and seeking preferment. He was not, however, restored to his see, and, as no subsequent mention of him occurs, he is believed to have died soon after.
