= Coláiste Moibhí =

Former preparatory school, Dublin, Ireland

Coláiste Moibhí was a preparatory school in Ireland providing Irish-language instruction for Protestant boys and girls intending to proceed to train as primary schoolteachers. Operating from 1926 to 1995, it was located just outside Shankill, Dublin, until the premises closed. It was relocated in Rathmines, Dublin. Run by the Church of Ireland, in 1968 it became the Juniorate of the adjacent Church of Ireland College of Education, to which most pupils would graduate. It was named after Moibhí, a sixth-century saint from Kilmovee, County Mayo.

The college was one of six Irish-language preparatory schools established by the government of the newly established Irish Free State, as part of a Gaelicisation policy which required a supply of teachers fluent in Irish. It was approved by John Allen Fitzgerald Gregg, the Church of Ireland Archbishop of Dublin. It survived the closure of the other five (Catholic ethos) preparatory schools (two for boys and three for girls) in 1961, as decided by Patrick Hillery, Minister for Education in the Fianna Fáil Government between 1959 and 1965, and later President of Ireland. In light of the growth of multidenominational schools, Coláiste Moibhí closed in June 1995 and its former premises now form the Resource Centre of the Church of Ireland Training College library.
