= Ecclesiastical capital =

The religious capital or ecclesiastical capital of a region is a place considered pre-eminent by the adherents of a particular religion within that region. This is most often significant for the region's predominant religion or state religion, if any. The administrative headquarters of an organised religion may be centralised in a particular location; for example, Rome for the Catholic Church, or Salt Lake City for the Church of Jesus Christ of Latter-day Saints. In an episcopal church, the site of the cathedral of the primate bishop of an area may be considered its ecclesiastical capital; for example, Armagh is the seat of the primate of All Ireland in both the Catholic church and the Anglican church. Others may be places of pilgrimage, such as Jerusalem for the Abrahamic religions, Mecca for Islam, and Varanasi for Hinduism; or considered religious capitals by being centres of learning, such as Qom for Shia Islam in Iran.

== See also ==
- Capital city
