= George Browne (archbishop of Dublin) =

English Augustinian and archbishop

The Right Reverend George Browne D.D.
- Archbishop of Dublin; Primate of Ireland
- Church: Church of Ireland
- Archdiocese: Dublin
- Appointed: 11 January 1536
- In office: 1536–1554
- Predecessor: John Alen
- Successor: Hugh Curwen

Orders
- Consecration: 19 March 1536 by Thomas Cranmer

Personal details
- Denomination: Anglican

George Browne (died 1556) was an English Augustinian who was appointed by King Henry VIII to the vacant Episcopal see of Dublin. He became the king's main instrument in his desire to establish the state church in the Kingdom of Ireland. An iconoclast, during the Protestant Reformation he is noted for destroying the Bachal Isu, one of the symbols of authority of the Archbishop of Armagh.

== Life ==
Almost nothing is known of his family, or his early life: his place and date of birth are both uncertain. As provincial of the suppressed Augustinian Hermits (Austin Friars) in England, he was employed, in conjunction with John Hilsey, the provincial of the suppressed Dominican Order (Blackfriars), to administer the 1534 oath of succession to all the friars of London and the south of England. He is said to have recommended himself to the king by advising the poor in distress about the religious changes to make their applications solely to Christ. Within a year he was nominated to the see of Dublin, vacant by the murder of Archbishop John Alen in the rising of Kildare in 1534; but it was not until another year had elapsed that he arrived in Ireland, in July 1536. He had meanwhile received the degree of D.D. at Oxford in 1535.

== Henry's religious policy ==
The murder of Alen afforded the King an opportunity of introducing his religious agenda into Ireland. He kept the see vacant for nearly a year, and then filled it without any reference to the Pope, by the appointment of Browne. He was consecrated by Thomas Cranmer, on 19 March 1536, and took up his residence in Dublin in August 1536. The antecedents of Browne and the schismatical character of his appointment did not recommend him to the Dublin clergy. He complained of their resistance to his injunctions and was compelled to send round his own servants in order to cancel the Pope's name in the service books. A warning from the King stirred him up to more demonstrative action, and he had all holy relics preserved in Christ Church cathedral, including St. Patrick's crozier, known as the "Staff of Jesus", gathered into a heap and burned. He cooperated in the suppression of all the religious houses, in changing the prior and convent of Christ Church into a secular dean and chapter, and in the total suppression of the chapter of St Patrick's Cathedral, Dublin.

The Irish Parliament, which had been sitting for two months, accepted all the principal acts by which England had declared herself independent of Rome. Opposition to these measures was offered by the clergy, who claimed the power of voting in their own house upon bills which had passed the Irish commons. Under the leadership of the primate George Cromer, their obstruction had succeeded, and they were deprived of their privileges. A speech made by Browne on this occasion, declaring his vote for the king as supreme head of the Irish church, has been preserved; and it was through him, that a separate act was passed granting the first-fruits of all abbeys to the King, thus paving the way for the dissolution of the monasteries, which quickly followed. Browne also held a commission from Thomas Cromwell, to further 'the king's advantage;' and in this cause he journeyed into various parts, preaching, publishing the royal articles and injunctions, and collecting the first-fruits and twentieths of the spiritualties which had been decreed to the King. He put forth a form of prayer, which is the earliest document in which the Church of Ireland is joined with the Church of England under royal supremacy.

Browne had a rough reception in Ireland: he was faced with the open hostility of many colleagues, especially Edward Staples, the Bishop of Meath, and viewed with suspicion by the Privy Council of Ireland. The Lord Deputy Leonard Grey, 1st Viscount Grane was his enemy, and treated him with contempt, on one occasion putting him in prison. The King wrote him a severe letter after receiving complaints.

Browne had greater success with the hierarchy: the prelates who had followed George Dowdall gradually conformed; and when, in the middle of the same year, 1550, Dowdall went from his see at Armagh, declaring that he would not be bishop where there was no mass, he was isolated. Hugh Goodacre, an Englishman sent by Cranmer, was consecrated by Browne at Christ Church as Dowdall's replacement. At the same time the Primacy of Ireland, the ancient dignity of the see of Armagh, was claimed by Browne, and transferred by royal patent to Dublin. He made less progress with evangelism, and the churches were emptier than ever. John Bale, who arrived in Ireland as Bishop of Ossory at the same time as Goodacre, thought Browne himself remiss, and they quarrelled as soon as he was consecrated.

== Edward's religious policy ==
Under Henry's immediate successor, Edward VI, Browne introduced that monarch's new liturgy into the cathedral – the first Book of Common Prayer. He finished by taking a wife. In Edward's first years the royal policy for the regulation of the Church in Ireland languished and Browne was under a cloud. From 1550, the attempt was resumed to impose on Ireland the English alterations of religion. By that time Edward Bellingham had been succeeded by the second administration as Lord Deputy of Anthony St Leger. His instructions were to order the clergy to use the English service, and he summoned a convention of the bishops and clergy at Dublin. The Lord Deputy read the royal order for the service to be in English. The primate George Dowdall was indignant and left the meeting, followed by most of the bishops. St Leger then handed the order to Browne, who advised submission. On the following Easter Sunday, the English service was used for the first time in the cathedral church of Dublin, Browne preaching the sermon. Browne and St Leger later quarrelled bitterly: Browne accused St Leger of speaking treasonable words, but was unable to produce evidence to prove the charge.

== Mary's religious policy ==
On the accession of Queen Mary I in 1553, Bale was forced to quit Ossory and fly for his life to Dublin. Browne refused to allow him to preach there. In the revolution under Mary, Dublin's primacy was revoked and Dowdall was reinstated in his see and title of primate of all Ireland. By Dowdall Browne was then deposed from his see on the grounds that was then a married man, contrary to his ordination oath. Two years later, in September 1555, his successor, Hugh Curwen, was appointed. When Curwen later changed allegiances, he became the only Archbishop of Dublin to be recognised as such by both the Roman Catholic and Anglican successions. Browne's death followed shortly after his deposition. It is surmised that he died about 1556.

== Biography ==
James Ussher describes him in Memoirs of the Ecclesiastical Affairs of Ireland as: "George Browne is a man of cheerful countenance; in his acts and conduct, plain and downright; to the poor, merciful and compassionate, pitying the state and condition of the souls of the people and advising them, when he was the provincial of the Augustine order in England, to make their application solely to Christ; which advice coming to the ears of Henry VIII., he became a favourite, and was made an archbishop of Dublin. Within five years after he enjoyed that see he caused all superstitious relics and images to be removed out of the two cathedrals in Dublin, and out of all churches in his diocese; and caused the Ten Commandments, the Lord's Prayer, and the Creed, to be placed in gilded frames about the altars. He was the first that turned from Romish religion of the clergy here in Ireland, to embrace the reformation of the church of England."

Church of Ireland titles
Preceded by John Alen	Archbishop of Dublin; 1536–1554	Succeeded by Hugh Curwen

== Notes ==
Attribution

- This article incorporates text from a publication now in the public domain: Dixon, Richard Watson (1886). "Browne, George (d.1556)". In Stephen, Leslie (ed.). Dictionary of National Biography. Vol. 7. London: Smith, Elder & Co.
