= Diocese of Armagh (Church of Ireland) =

Anglican diocese of the Church of Ireland

Diocese of Armagh Dioecesis Armachanus Deoise Ard Mhacha
- Coat of arms

Location
- Country: Northern Ireland; Republic of Ireland
- Ecclesiastical province: Armagh and Tuam

Information
- Denomination: Anglican
- Cathedral: St Patrick's Cathedral, Armagh

Current leadership
- Bishop: John McDowell, Archbishop of Armagh

Website
- armagh.anglican.org

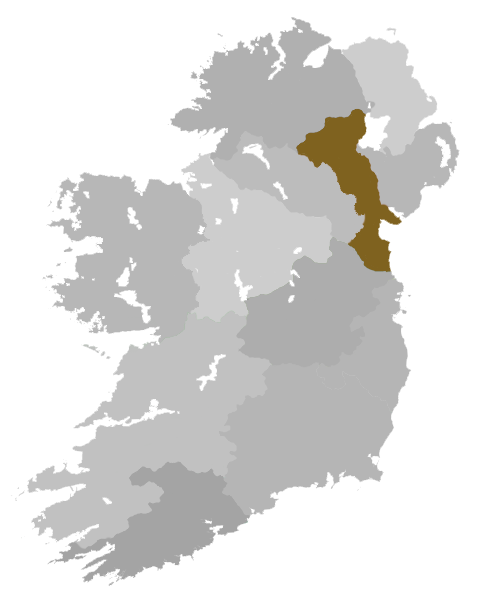
Diocese highlighted within Ireland

The Diocese of Armagh is the metropolitan diocese of the ecclesiastical province of Armagh, the Church of Ireland province that covers the northern half (approximately) of the island of Ireland. The diocese mainly covers counties Louth, Tyrone and Armagh, and parts of Down. The diocesan bishop is also the Archbishop of Armagh, the archbishop of the province, and the Primate of All Ireland. The Archbishop has his seat in St Patrick's Cathedral in the city of Armagh.

== Overview and history ==
As of 2011 the diocese had 31,000 parishioners in its 44 parochial units. Ordained and lay ministry involved 47 serving and 28 retired clergy; 13 Diocesan Readers and 37 Parish Readers.

The diocese traces its history to St Patrick in the 5th century, who founded the see. Church property that existed when the Church of Ireland broke with the Roman Catholic Church, buildings included, was retained by the reformed Church of Ireland, then on the disestablishment of the Church in 1871, confiscated by the state. Schools, churches and cathedrals were returned to the Church.

== Ordinaries ==
The first Anglican Archbishop was Hugh Goodacre, appointed by King Edward VI in 1552. The current archbishop is John McDowell.

== List of churches ==
Acton (Holy Trinity), Aghavilly (St Mary), Altedesert Parish Church, Annaghmore (St Francis), Ardboe Parish Church, Ardee (St Mary), Ardtrea (St Andrew), Armagh Cathedral (St Patrick), Armagh St Mark, Armaghbreague (Holy Trinity), Ballinderry (St John), Ballyclog (St Patrick), Ballyeglish (St Matthias), Ballygawley Parish Church, Ballymascanlan (St Mary), Ballymoyer (St Luke), Belleek (St Luke), Benburb (St Patrick), Bessbrook (Christ the Redeemer), Brackaville (Holy Trinity), Brantry (Holy Trinity), Caledon (St John), Carnteel (St James), Castlebellingham (St Mary), Castlecaulfield (St Michael), Clare Parish Church, Clogherny (St Patrick), Clonoe (St Michael), Collon Parish Church, Cookstown (St Luran), Creggan Parish Church, Crilly (St George), Derrygortreavy (St Columba), Derrynoose (St John), Desertcreat Parish Church, Desertlyn (St John), Diamond Grange (St Paul), Dobbin (St Saviour), Donaghendry (St Patrick), Donaghmore (St Patrick), Drogheda (St Peter), Drumbanagher (St Mary), Drumcree (Ascension), Drumnakilly (Holy Trinity), Drumsallan Parish Church, Dundalk (St Nicholas), Dungannon (St Anne), Dunleer Parish Church, Errigle Keerogue (St Matthew), Gracefield Chapel, Grange (St Aidan), Heynestown (St Paul), Keady (St Matthew), Kilcluney (St John), Kildarton Parish Church, Kildress (St Patrick), Killeshill (St Paul), Killylea (St Mark), Killyman (St Andrew), Kilmore (St Aidan), Lisnadill (St John), Lissan Parish Church, Loughgall (St Luke), Loughgilly (St Patrick), Magherafelt (St Swithun), Markethill Chapel, Middletown (St John), Milltown (St Andrew), Moy (St James), Moygashel (St Elizabeth), Mullabrack (St John), Mullaglass (St Luke), Mullavilly Parish Church, Newtownhamilton (St John), Pomeroy (All Saints), Portadown St Columba, Portadown St Mark, Rathcor (St Andrew), Richhill (St Matthew), Seskinore Chapel, Sixmilecross (St Michael), Tamlaght (St Luke), Tandragee (St Mark), Tartaraghan (St Paul), Termonmaguirke (St Columbkille), Tullanisken (Holy Trinity), Tynan (St Vindic), Woodschapel (St John)

== See also ==
- List of Anglican dioceses in the United Kingdom and Ireland
- Roman Catholic Archdiocese of Armagh
