= George Cromer =

English archbishop

The Most Reverend George Cromer
- Archbishop of Armagh; Primate of All Ireland
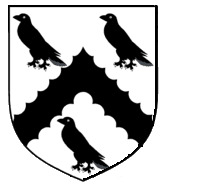
- Arms of Cromer: Argent, a chevron engrailed, between three crows, sable
- Church: Roman Catholic
- Archdiocese: Armagh
- Appointed: 2 October 1521
- In office: 1521–1543
- Predecessor: John Kite
- Successor: George Dowdall

Orders
- Consecration: April 1522

Personal details
- Born: c.1470
- Died: 16 March 1542
- Parents: Sir James Cromer; Katherine Cantelowe

George Cromer (died 16 March 1542) was Archbishop of Armagh and Primate of All Ireland in the reign of Henry VIII of England, from 1521/2.

== Biography ==
Cromer was English by birth, a descendant of the Cromer (also spelt Crowemer) family of Tunstall, Kent and Cromer, Norfolk. He was the younger son of Sir James Cromer of Tunstall (died 1503) and Katherine Cantelowe, daughter of Sir William Cantelowe, a wealthy merchant of Milk Street, London. He was probably born around 1470.

He was referred to as a Doctor of Divinity, and appears to have been a royal chaplain attached to the English Court by 1518. He was consecrated Archbishop in 1522.

Caught up in Henry's Reformation of the Church of England, he was deprived of his See of Armagh. He continued in place as Archbishop of Armagh, despite suspicions from Henry about his true beliefs and his loyalty to the Crown, and despite being suspended by the Pope on a charge of heresy, and in spite of his failing health.

He was Lord Chancellor of Ireland 1532–4, as a placeman of Gerald FitzGerald, 9th Earl of Kildare, whose family dominated Irish politics from the 1470s until the late 1530s, and wielded such power that they were known as "the uncrowned Kings of Ireland". When the FitzGeralds destroyed themselves in the Rebellion of Silken Thomas, Cromer's own loyalty was naturally suspected, even though he had tried to prevent the Rebellion—in 1536 he had opposed the Acts of Supremacy which made Henry VIII Supreme Head of the Church of England. He was suspended from office as Chancellor and narrowly escaped prosecution for treason. In his last years, he was restored to limited royal favour, and was allowed to attend Parliament in 1541, but died the following year.
