= Church of Ireland =

Anglican church in Ireland

- Eaglais na hÉireann (Irish); Kirk o Airlann (Ulster Scots)
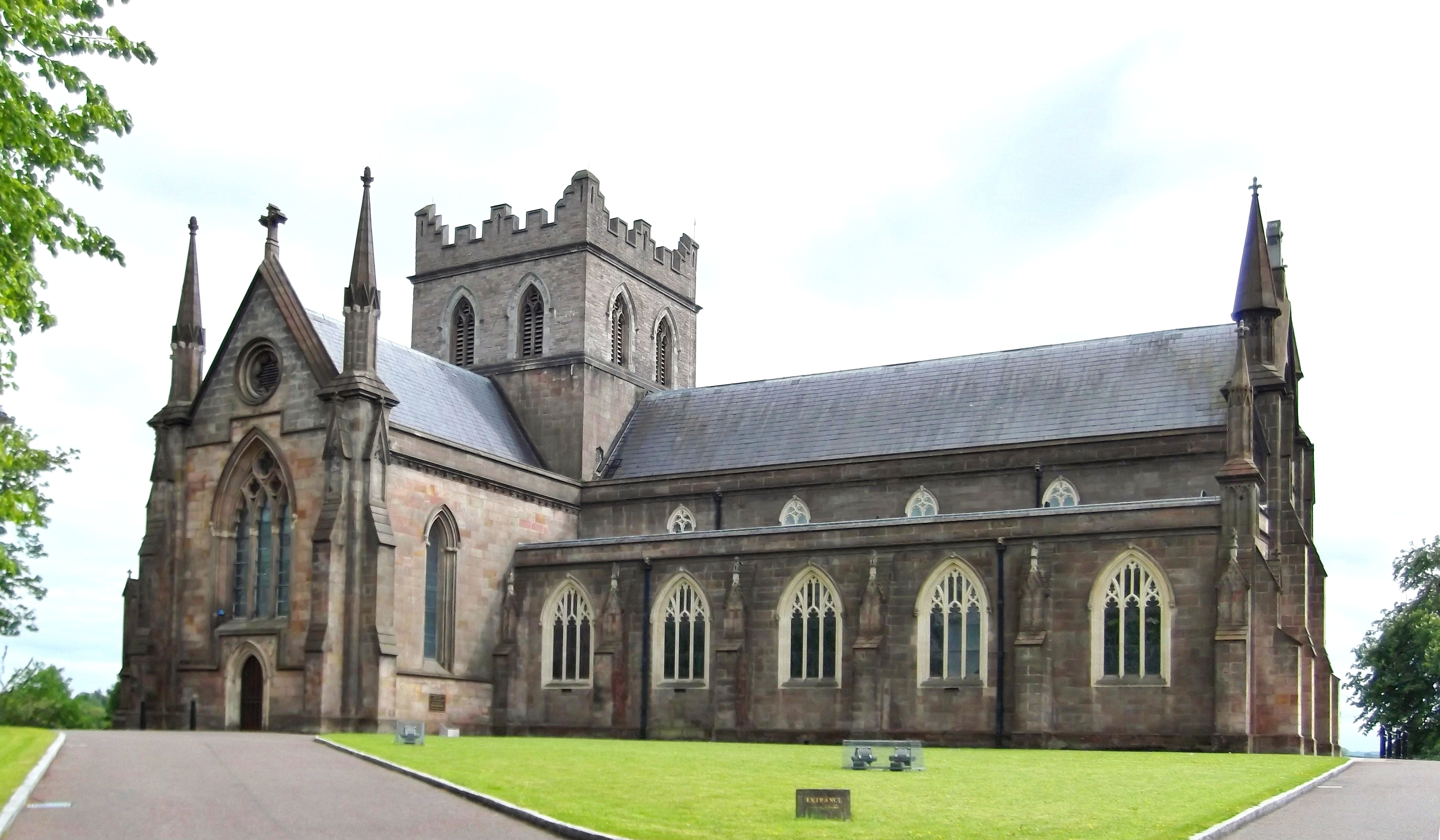
- St Patrick's Cathedral, Armagh, seat of the Primate of All Ireland
- Classification: Protestant
- Orientation: Anglican
- Scripture: Protestant Bible
- Theology: Anglican doctrine (Note: With various theological and doctrinal identities, including Anglo-Catholic, Liberal and Evangelicals.)
- Polity: Episcopal
- Primate: John McDowell
- Associations: Anglican Communion; Conference of European Churches; Churches Together in Britain and Ireland; Irish Council of Churches; Porvoo Communion
- Full communion: Methodist Church in Ireland; Moravian Church of the British Province
- Region: Ireland
- Language: English, Irish
- Headquarters: Church of Ireland House; Church Avenue; Rathmines; Dublin D06 CF67; Ireland
- Independence: 1871 (disestablishment)
- Separated from: Roman Catholic Church in 1536
- Branched from: Theologically: Church of England
- Congregations: 1100 places of worship 450 parishes
- Members: 343,400
- Official website: ireland.anglican.org

The Church of Ireland (Irish: Eaglais na hÉireann, pronounced [ˈaɡlˠəʃ n̪ˠə ˈheːɾʲən̪ˠ]; Ulster-Scots: Kirk o Airlann, [kɪrk ə ˈerlən(d)]) is a Christian church in Ireland, and an autocephalous member church of the Anglican Communion. It is organised on an all-Ireland basis and is the second-largest Christian church on the island after the Roman Catholic Church. Like other Anglican churches, it has retained elements of pre-Reformation practice, notably its episcopal polity, while rejecting the primacy of the pope.

In theological and liturgical matters, it incorporates many principles of the Reformation, particularly those of the English Reformation, but self-identifies as being both Reformed and Catholic, in that it sees itself as the inheritor of a continuous tradition going back to the founding of Christianity in Ireland. As with other members of the global Anglican Communion, individual parishes accommodate differing approaches to the level of ritual and formality, variously referred to as High and Low Church.

As of 2013, the Church of Ireland ranked "second in the State in terms of the provision of primary schools with 174 schools under its Patronage." There were "over 500 teachers and over 13,500 pupils in Church of Ireland Primary schools." There were at the time "twenty post-primary schools in the State which are either affiliated with the Church of Ireland at diocesan level or" are self-identified as Church of Ireland.

== Overview ==
The Church of Ireland sees itself as that 'part of the Irish Church which was influenced by the Reformation, and has its origins in the early Celtic Church of St Patrick. This makes it both catholic, as the inheritor of a continuous tradition of faith and practice, and protestant, since it rejects the authority of Rome and accepts changes in doctrine and liturgy caused by the Reformation.

Following the Synod of Ráth Breasail (also known as Rathbreasail) in 1111, Irish Catholicism transitioned from a monastic to a diocesan and parish-based mode of organisation and governance. Many Irish present-day dioceses trace their boundaries to decisions made at the synod. The work of organizing the Church was completed by the Synod of Kells which took place in 1152, under the presidency of Giovanni Cardinal Paparoni. Diocesan reform continued and the number of archbishoprics was increased from two to four. The synod granted the Primacy of Ireland to the Archdiocese of Armagh.

Some modern scholarship argues that early Irish Christianity was functionally separate from Rome but shared much of its liturgy and practice, and that this allowed both the Church of Ireland and Irish Catholicism to claim descent from Saint Patrick. It is also said that the Catholic Church in Ireland was jurisdictionally independent until 1155, when Pope Adrian IV purported to declare it a papal fief in the bull Laudabiliter and granted Henry II of England the Lordship of Ireland in return for paying tithes; his right to do so has been disputed ever since.

In 1534, the English Parliament passed the Act of Supremacy, which broke communion with the papacy and recognised Henry VIII as head of the Church of England; two years later, the Irish Parliament followed suit by acknowledging him as head of the Irish church. Although many bishops and most of the clergy refused to conform, the Church of Ireland was left with diocesan buildings and lands, since under the feudal system bishops held that property as vassals of the Crown. Despite the political and economic advantages of membership in the new church, a large majority of the Irish remained loyal to the Catholic Church centred in Rome, while in Ulster the church was outnumbered by Presbyterians. However, it remained the established church of the whole of Ireland until the First Gladstone ministry's Irish Church Act 1869 (32 & 33 Vict. c. 42) disestablished it, with effect from 1 January 1871.

The modern Church of Ireland is the second largest religious organisation in the Republic of Ireland, and the third largest in Northern Ireland, after the Roman Catholic and Presbyterian churches.

== History ==
=== Formation ===
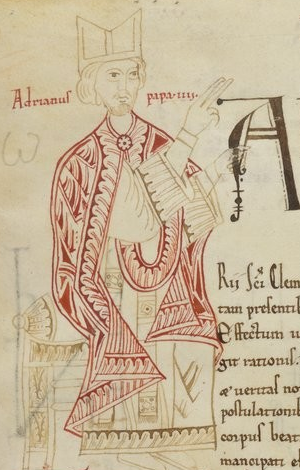
Pope Adrian IV, who claimed Ireland for the Papacy in 1155

Christianity in Ireland is generally dated to the mid to late 5th century AD, when the Romano-British cleric Saint Patrick began his conversion mission, although the exact dates are disputed. Prior to the 12th-century reforms, the Irish church was part of the wider Latin Church and in communion with Rome, but it had a distinctive organisation in which major monasteries often exercised considerable authority, while diocesan and episcopal structures were less developed than they became after the reform synods of the 12th century. While the Kingdom of Dublin looked to the English Diocese of Canterbury for guidance, in 1005 AD Brian Ború made a large donation to the Monastery of Armagh and recognised its Archbishop as Primate of all Ireland in an attempt to secure his position as High King of Ireland.

Inspired by Máel Máedóc Ua Morgair, reformist head of Bangor Abbey, the 1111 Synod of Ráth Breasail sought to reduce the power of the monasteries by creating Dioceses headed by bishops, as was common outside Ireland. Under the 1152 Synod of Kells, the Irish church received its own archbishops, rather than being subject to Canterbury. Under the Laudabiliter in 1155, English-born Pope Adrian IV granted Henry II of England the Lordship of Ireland in return for paying tithes to Rome. His claim was based on the 4th-century Donation of Constantine, which allegedly gave the Papacy religious control over all Christian territories in the western Roman Empire. Its legality was disputed at the time, since Ireland had never been part of the empire, while the Donation itself was later exposed as a forgery.

Since Ireland was now considered a papal fief, its bishops were appointed by Rome but generally adopted English liturgy and saints, such as Edward the Confessor, and Thomas Becket. In 1536, the Irish Parliament followed their English colleagues by accepting Henry VIII of England as head of the church, rather than the Pope. This marks the founding of the reformed Church of Ireland, confirmed when Henry became King of Ireland in 1541. Largely restricted to Dublin, led by Archbishop George Browne, it expanded under Edward VI, until Catholicism was restored by his sister Mary I in 1553.

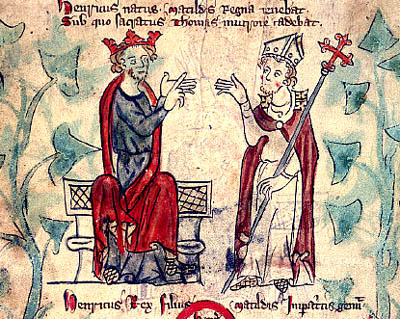
Henry II with Thomas Becket; the 1155 intervention was the start of efforts to Anglicise the Irish church

When Elizabeth I of England became queen in 1558, only five bishops accepted her Religious Settlement, and most of the Irish clergy had to be deposed. This was hampered by the church's relative poverty, while adapting to the changes of regime damaged the reputation of those who remained. Hugh Curwen was Dean of Hereford until 1555, when Mary made him Catholic Archbishop of Dublin, before returning to the reformed church in 1558. Despite accusations of 'moral delinquency', he remained Archbishop and Lord Chancellor until 1567, when he was appointed Bishop of Oxford.

The absence of Gaelic-speaking ministers led to the adoption of a gradualist policy, similar to that used in Catholic areas of Northern England. 'Occasional conformity' allowed the use of pre-Reformation rites, combined with acceptance of the established Church; this practice persisted in both England and Ireland well into the mid-18th century.

Lack of Irish Gaelic literature was another restriction; shortly before his death in 1585, Nicholas Walsh began translation of the New Testament. Continued by John Kearny and Nehemiah Donnellan, it was finally printed in 1602 by William Daniel, who also translated the Book of Common Prayer, or BCP, in 1606. An Irish version of the Old Testament was published in 1685 by Narcissus Marsh, but the revised BCP was not available until 1712.

=== 17th century ===
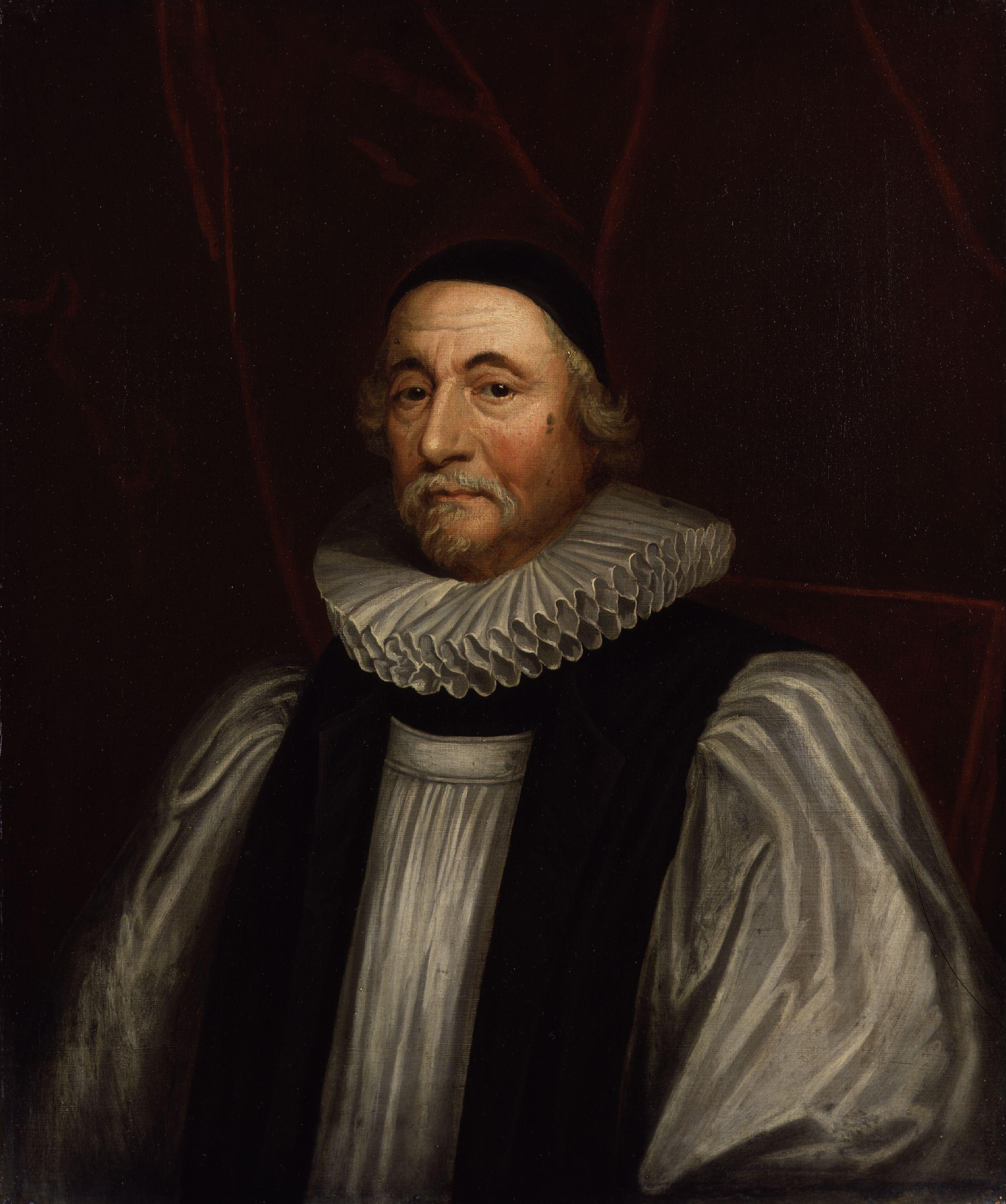
James Ussher, Archbishop of Armagh

At the beginning of the 17th century, most native Irish were Catholic, with Protestant settlers in Ulster establishing an independent Presbyterian church. Largely confined to an English-speaking minority in The Pale, the most important figure of the Church's development was Dublin-born theologian and historian, James Ussher, Archbishop of Armagh from 1625 to 1656. In 1615, the Church of Ireland drew up its own confession of faith, similar to the English version, but more detailed, less ambiguous and often explicitly Calvinist. When the Thirty-Nine Articles were formally adopted by the Irish church in 1634, Ussher ensured they were in addition to the Irish Articles; however, they were soon superseded by the Thirty Nine Articles, which remain in use to the present day.

Under Charles I, the Church of Ireland claimed to be the original and universal church, while the Papacy was an innovation, thus vesting it with the supremacy of Apostolic succession. This argument was supported by Ussher, and Charles' former personal chaplain, John Leslie, a key supporter of Caroline reforms in Scotland, appointed bishop of Derry & Raphoe in 1633. During the 1641–1653 Irish Confederate Wars, nearly two-thirds of Ireland was controlled by the largely Catholic Confederacy, and in 1644, Giovanni Battista Rinuccini became Papal Nuncio to Ireland. Irish Catholicism had developed greater tolerance for Protestants, while sharing their hostility to elaborate ritual. Rinuccini's insistence on following Roman liturgy, and attempts to re-introduce ceremonies such as foot washing divided the Confederacy, and contributed to its rapid collapse in the 1649–1652 Cromwell's re-conquest of Ireland.

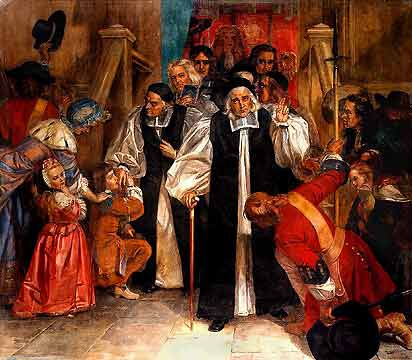
The Seven Bishops acquitted, June 1688; a key factor in the removal of James, five later became Non-Jurors

The church was re-established after the 1660 Restoration of Charles II and in January 1661, meetings by 'Papists, Presbyterians, Independents or separatists' were made illegal. In practice, the penal laws were loosely enforced and after 1666, Protestant Dissenters and Catholics were allowed to resume their seats in the Parliament of Ireland. In 1685, the Catholic James II became king with considerable backing in all three kingdoms; this changed when his policies seemed to go beyond tolerance for Catholicism and into an attack on the established church. His prosecution of the Seven Bishops in England for seditious libel in June 1688 destroyed his support base, while many felt James lost his right to govern by ignoring his coronation Oath to maintain the primacy of the Protestant religion.

This made oaths a high-profile issue, since ministers of the national churches of England, Scotland and Ireland were required to swear allegiance to the ruling monarch. When the 1688 Glorious Revolution replaced James with his Protestant daughter and son-in-law, Mary II and William III, a minority felt bound by their previous oath and refused to swear another. This led to the Non-Juring schism, although for the vast majority, this was a matter of personal conscience, rather than political support for James.

The Irish church was less affected by this controversy, although the Bishop of Kilmore and Ardagh became a Non-Juror, as did a handful of the clergy, including Jacobite propagandist Charles Leslie. The Protestant Ascendancy in Ireland is traditionally viewed as beginning in 1691 when the Treaty of Limerick ended the 1689–1691 Williamite War. The Church re-established control and the 1697 Banishment Act expelled Catholic bishops and regular clergy from Ireland, leaving only the so-called secular clergy.

=== 18th century ===
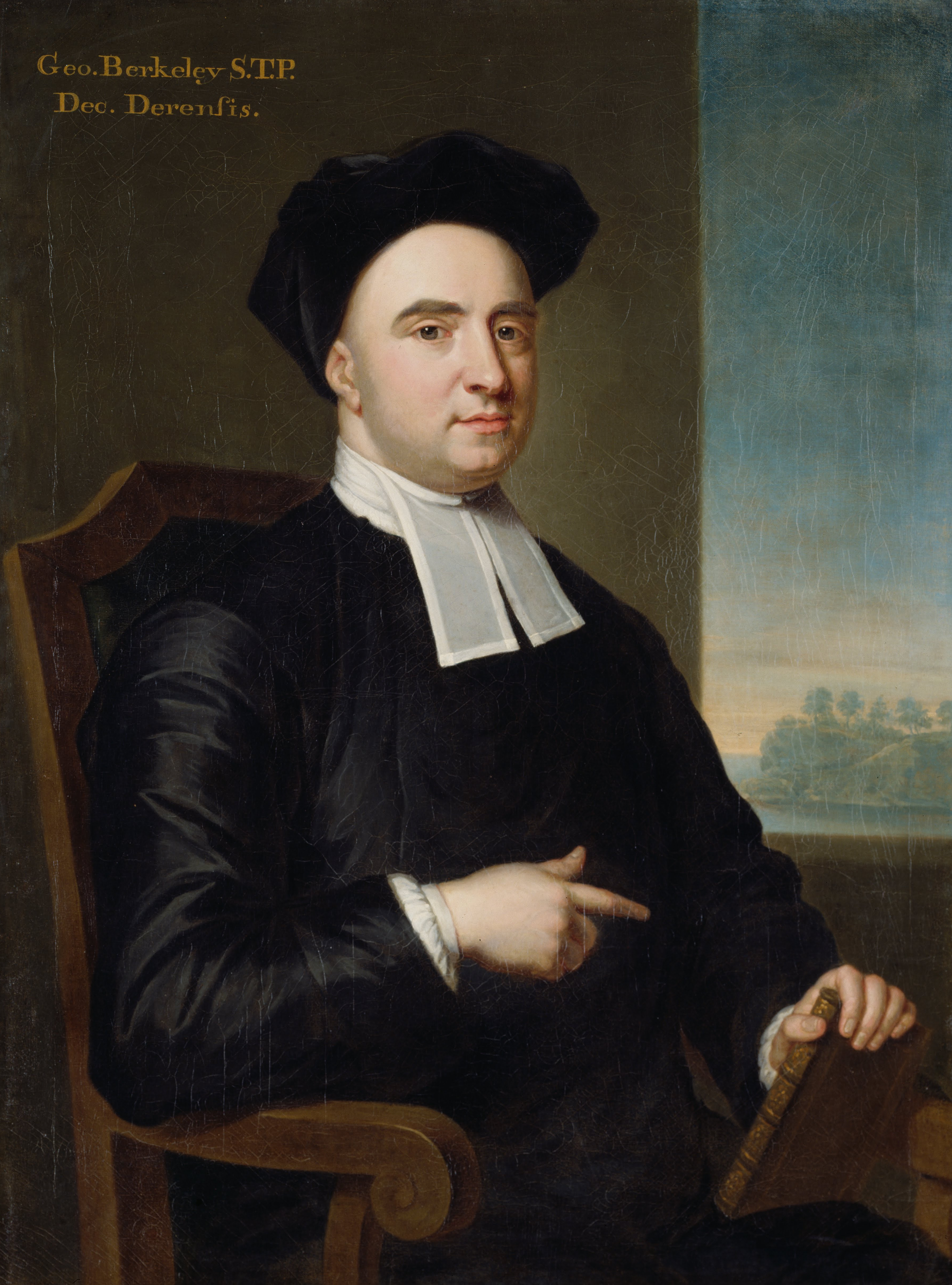
The philosopher and Church of Ireland bishop George Berkeley

In 1704, the Test Act was extended to Ireland; this effectively restricted public office to members of the Church of Ireland and officially remained in place until the 1829 Catholic Relief Act. However, the practice of occasional conformity continued, while many Catholic gentry by-passed these restrictions by educating their sons as Protestants, their daughters as Catholics; Edmund Burke, who was raised Church of Ireland but whose parents simultaneously raised his sister Juliana Catholic, is one example.

It is estimated fewer than 15 – 20% of the Irish population were nominally members of the church, which remained a minority under pressure from both Catholics and Protestant Nonconformists. The 1719 Toleration Act allowed Nonconformists freedom of worship, while the Irish Parliament paid their ministers a small subsidy known as the 'regium donum.'

Although willing to permit a degree of flexibility, like their English counterparts, Irish bishops viewed their status as the national church to be non-negotiable and used their seats in the Irish House of Lords to enforce this. However, in 1725 Parliament passed the first in a series of 'temporary' Indemnity Acts, which allowed office holders to 'postpone' taking the oaths; the bishops were willing to approve these, since they could be repealed at any point.

In the 17th century, religious and political beliefs were often assumed to be the same; thus Catholics were considered political subversives, simply because of their religion. During the 18th century, sectarian divisions were replaced by a growing sense of Irish autonomy; in 1749, Bishop Berkeley issued an address to the Catholic clergy, urging them to work together with the church in the (Irish) national interest. After 1750, the government increasingly viewed Catholic emancipation as a way to reduce the power of Protestant nationalists like the United Irishmen; this had potential implications for the church since the requirement non-church members pay tithes was deeply resented. The movement ended after the 1798 Rebellion and Ireland's incorporation with Britain.

=== 19th to 20th centuries ===
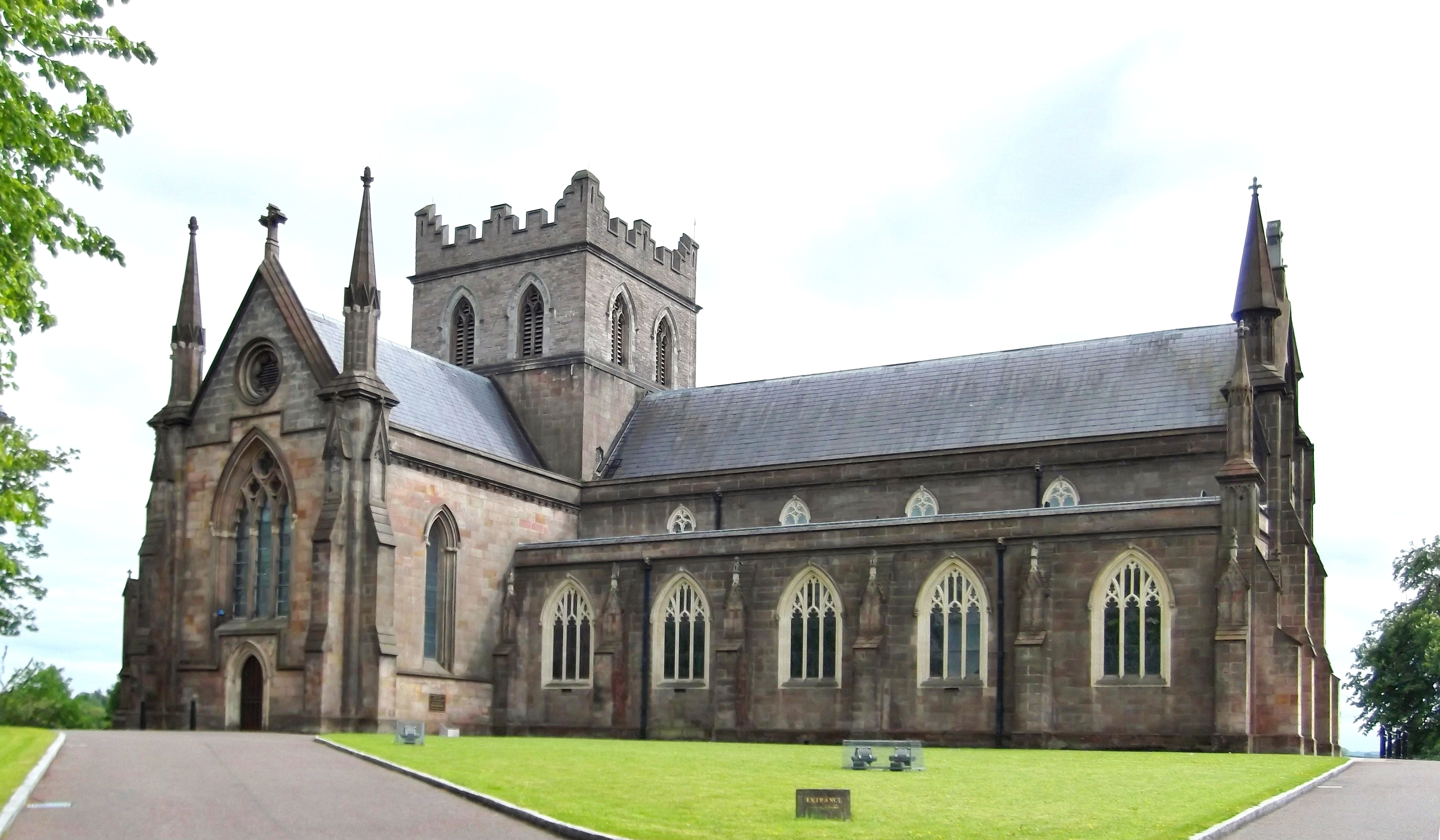
St Patrick's Cathedral, Armagh

Following the legal union of Ireland and the Kingdom of Great Britain by the Act of Union 1800, the Church of Ireland was also united with the Church of England to form the United Church of England and Ireland. At the same time, one archbishop and three bishops from Ireland (selected by rotation) were given seats in the House of Lords at Westminster, joining the two archbishops and twenty-four bishops from the Church of England.

The Irish Church was over-staffed, with 22 bishops, including 4 archbishops, for an official membership of 852,000, less than that of the Church of England's Diocese of Durham. The Church Temporalities (Ireland) Act 1833 (3 & 4 Will. 4. c. 37) reduced these to 12, as well as making financial changes. Part of a series of reforms by the 1830–1834 Whig government that included the Reform Act 1832, it caused deep political splits. The implications of government legislating church governance was a contributory factor in the Oxford Movement and had wide repercussions for the Anglican Communion.

Another source of resentment was the funding of the Church by tithes imposed on all Irish subjects, even though the majority were not members. This led to anomalies like the incumbent of a living near Bessborough, who in 1833 was receiving £1,000 per year, despite the fact the parish had no Protestants or even a church. The "Tithe War" of 1831–36 led to their replacement by the tithe rent charge but they did not entirely disappear until the Irish Church Act 1869.

The Act ended the Church's status as a state organisation; its bishops were removed from the House of Lords and its property transferred to the government. Compensation was paid but in the immediate aftermath, parishes faced great difficulty in local financing after the loss of rent-generating lands and buildings.

== Governance ==
The head of the Church of Ireland is, ex officio, the Archbishop of Armagh. In 1870, immediately prior to its disestablishment, the Church provided for its internal government, led by a General Synod, and with financial and administrative support by a Representative Church Body. Like other Irish churches, the Church of Ireland did not divide when Ireland was partitioned in the 1920s and it continues to be governed on an all-Ireland basis.

=== Structure ===
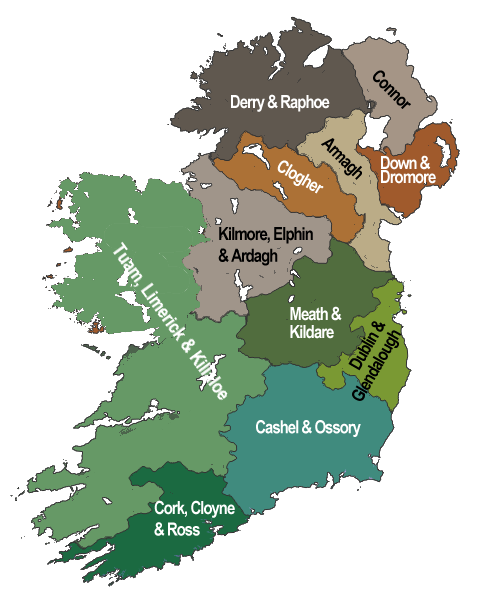
Map of the dioceses of the Church of Ireland ▉▉▉ Province of Armagh ▉▉▉ Province of Dublin

The polity of the Church of Ireland is episcopal church governance, as in other Anglican churches. The church maintains the traditional structure dating to pre-Reformation times, a system of geographical parishes organised into dioceses. There were more than 30 of these historically, grouped into four provinces; today, after consolidation over the centuries, there are eleven Church of Ireland dioceses or united dioceses, each headed by a bishop and belonging to one of two surviving provinces. In 2022 the diocese of Tuam, Killala and Achonry was merged with Limerick and Killaloe when both of the bishops of the separate dioceses retired and a new bishop was appointed for the combined diocese of Tuam, Limerick and Killaloe.

The leader of the southern province is the Archbishop of Dublin, at present Michael Jackson; that of the northern province is the Archbishop of Armagh, at present Francis John McDowell. These two archbishops are styled Primate of Ireland and Primate of All Ireland respectively, suggesting the ultimate seniority of the latter. Although he has relatively little absolute authority, the Archbishop of Armagh is respected as the church's general leader and spokesman, and is elected in a process different from those for all other bishops.

=== General synod and policy-making ===
Doctrine, canon law, church governance, church policy, and liturgical matters are decided by the church's general synod. The general synod comprises two houses, the House of Bishops and the House of Representatives. The House of Bishops includes the 9 diocesan bishops and two archbishops, forming one order. The House of Representatives is made up of two orders, clergy and laity. The order of clergy holds one third of the seats while the laity holds two-thirds of the seats. As of 2017, there are 216 clergy members and 432 lay members in the House of Representatives. The membership of the House of Representatives is made up of delegates from the dioceses, with seats allocated to each diocese's clergy and laity in specific numbers; these delegates are elected every three years. The General Synod meets each May annually. Historically, it was held in Synod Hall in Dublin from Disestablishment in 1870 until 1985 when it was held in Belfast and has since rotated around the eleven different dioceses. Special meetings can also be called by the leading bishop or one-third of any of its orders.

Changes in policy must be passed by a simple majority of both the House of Bishops and the House of Representatives. Changes to doctrine, for example the decision to ordain women as priests, must be passed by a two-thirds majority of both Houses. The two sit together for general deliberations but separate for some discussions and voting. While the House of Representatives always votes publicly, often by orders, the House of Bishops has tended to vote in private, coming to a decision before matters reach the floor of the synod. This practice has been broken only once when, in 1999, the House of Bishops voted unanimously in public to endorse the efforts of the Archbishop of Armagh, the Diocese of Armagh and the Standing Committee of the General Synod in their attempts to resolve the crisis at the Church of the Ascension at Drumcree near Portadown.

==== Statutes and constitution ====
The church's internal laws are formulated as bills proposed to the Houses of the general synod, which when passed become Statutes. The church's governing document, its constitution, is modified, consolidated and published by way of statute also, the most recent edition, the 13th, being published in 2003.

==== Representative body ====
The representative body of the Church of Ireland, often called the "Representative Church Body" (RCB), is the corporate trustee of the church, as established by law, and much of the church's property is vested in it. The members of the RCB are the bishops plus diocesan delegates and twelve co-opted members, and it meets at least four times a year. The staff of the representative body are analogous to clerical civil servants, and among other duties they oversee property, including church buildings, cemeteries and investments, administer some salaries and pensions, and manage the church library. While parishes, dioceses, and other parts of the church structure care for their particular properties, this is often subject to RCB rules.

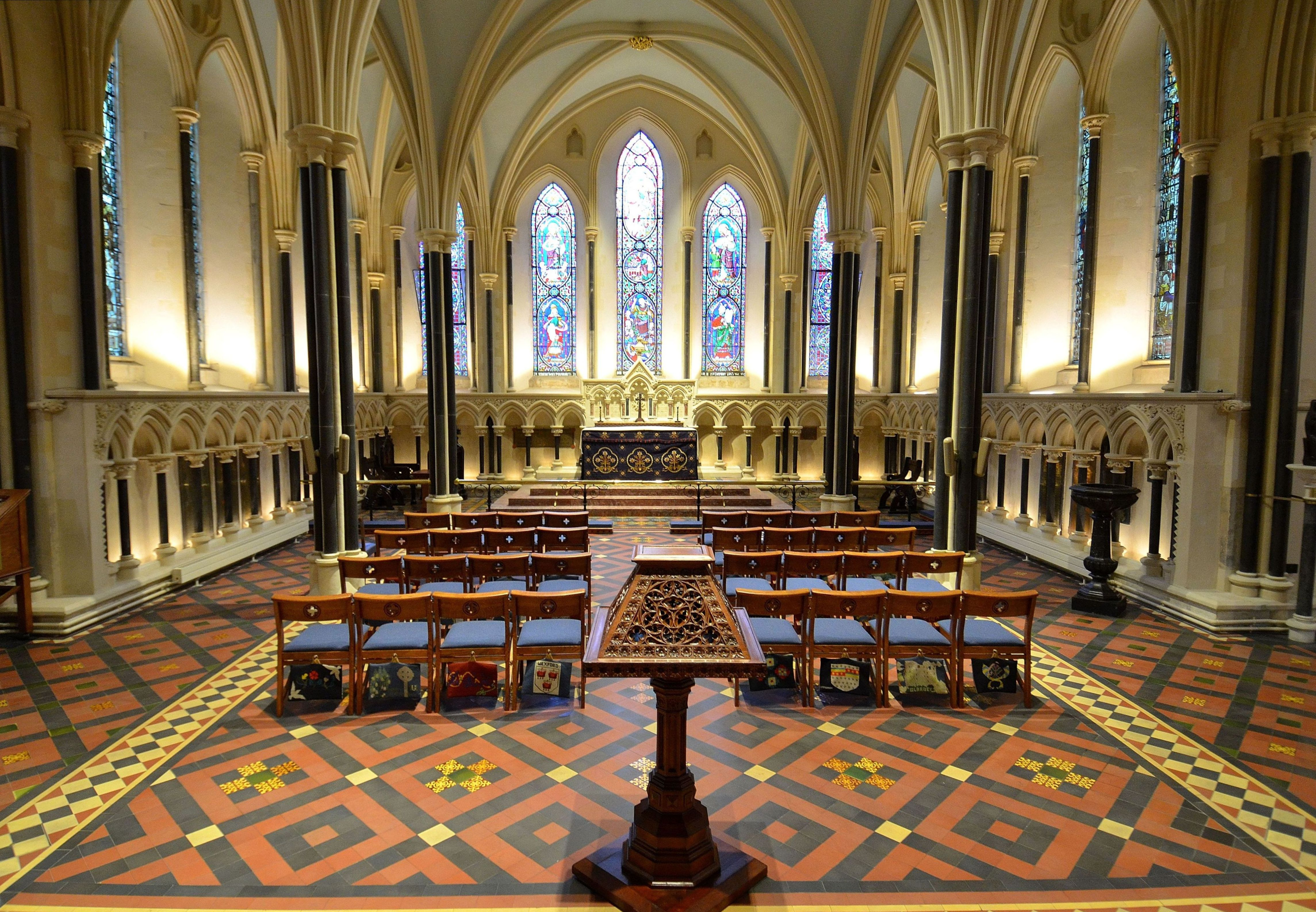
Lady Chapel, St Patrick's Cathedral, Dublin

=== Orders of ministry and positions ===
The Church of Ireland embraces three orders of ministry: deacons, priests (or presbyters) and bishops. These orders are distinct from positions such as rector, vicar or canon.

=== Diocesan governance ===
Each diocese or united diocese is led by its Ordinary, one of the nine bishops and two archbishops, and the Ordinary may have one or more Archdeacons to support them, along with a Rural Dean for each group of parishes. There is a diocesan synod for each diocese; there may be separate synods for historic dioceses now in unions. These synods comprise the bishop along with clergy and lay representatives from the parishes, and subject to the laws of the church, and the work of the general synod and its committees and the representative body and its committees, oversee the operation of the diocese. Each diocesan synod in turn appoints a diocesan council to which it can delegate powers.

=== Parochial governance ===
Each parish has a presiding member of the clergy, assisted by two churchwardens and often also two glebewardens, one of each type of warden being appointed by the clerical incumbent, and one by popular vote. All qualified adult members of the parish - whose names are listed in the Register of General Vestrymen - comprise the general vestry, which meets annually, within 20 days each side of Easter, as the Easter Vestry. There is also a select vestry for the parish, comprising the presiding cleric and any curate assistants, along with relevant churchwardens and glebewardens, and up to twelve members elected at the Easter Vestry meeting. The select vestry assists in the care and operation of the parish and of church buildings. Their remit is often described using the three Fs: fabrics, furnishings, and finance. Where parishes have been brought together under a single minister, they may be structured as a union, with a single vestry for the whole union of parishes, or a group, with each parish maintaining its own general and select vestries.

=== Cathedral governance ===
Special provisions apply to the management and operation of five key cathedrals, in Dublin (which contains two Church of Ireland cathedrals), Armagh, Down, and Belfast.

=== Tribunals ===
The church has disciplinary and appeals tribunals, and diocesan courts, and a court of the general synod.

== Present ==
=== Membership ===
The Church of Ireland experienced a major decline in membership during the 20th century, both in Northern Ireland, where around 65% of its members live, and in the Republic of Ireland. The church is still the second-largest in the Republic of Ireland, with 126,414 members in 2016 (minus 2% compared to the 2011 census results) and the third-largest in Northern Ireland, with around 260,000 members. The most recently available figures published by the Church of Ireland, dating to 2013, found that average Sunday attendance across the church was 58,257, with 74 per cent of this attendance in the Province of Armagh. Attendance varied strongly across dioceses; the most-attended diocese was Down and Dromore, with 12,731 in average Sunday attendance, while the least-attended was Meath and Kildare with 1,463. Similarly, in 2016, a peer-reviewed study published in the Journal of Anglican Studies by Cambridge University Press found that the Church of Ireland has approximately 384,176 total members and 58,000 active baptised members. Down & Dromore Diocese, considered the most conservative, also remains by far the largest of the eleven dioceses, representing one quarter of all Sunday attendees.

=== Cathedrals ===
The Church of Ireland has two cathedrals in Dublin: within the line of the walls of the old city is Christ Church Cathedral, the seat of the Archbishop of Dublin, and just outside the old walls is St Patrick's Cathedral, which the church designated as the National Cathedral for Ireland in 1870. Cathedrals also exist in the other dioceses.

There is also the metropolitan cathedral church of Ireland, situated in Armagh, St Patrick's Cathedral. This cathedral is the seat of the archbishop and metropolitan, John McDowell.

=== Offices, training of priests and teachers ===
The church's central offices are in Rathmines, adjacent to the former Church of Ireland College of Education, and the church's library is in Churchtown. Teacher training now occurs within the Dublin City University Institute of Education, overseen by the Church of Ireland Centre, based at the former All Hallows College. The church operates a seminary, the Church of Ireland Theological Institute, in Rathgar, in the south inner suburbs of Dublin.

=== Anglican Communion ===
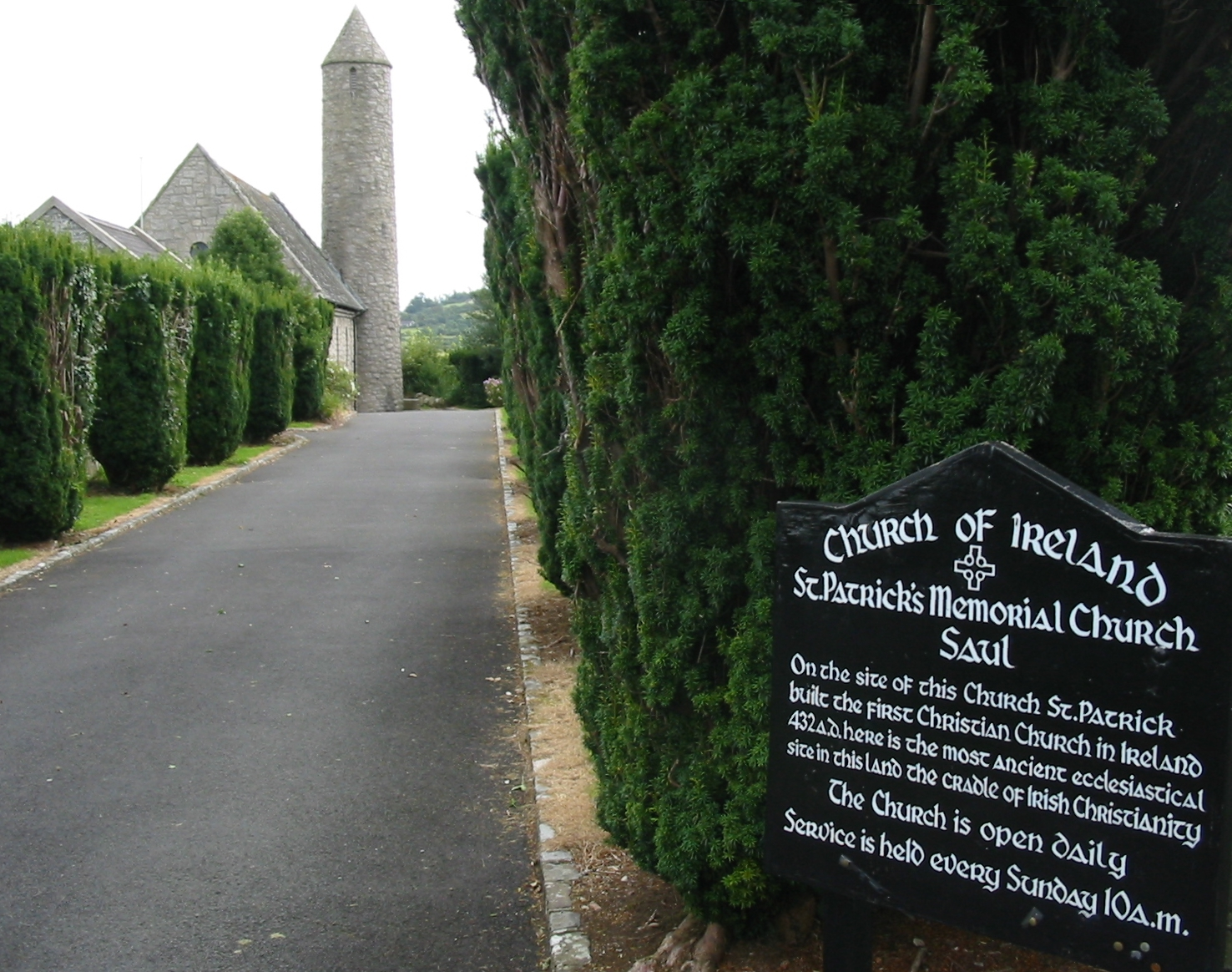
Saul church, a modern replica of an early church with a round tower, is built on the reputed spot of St Patrick's first church in Ireland.

The churches of the Anglican Communion are linked by affection and common loyalty. They are in full communion with the See of Canterbury and thus the Archbishop of Canterbury, in her person, is a unique focus of Anglican unity. She calls the once-a-decade Lambeth Conference, chairs the meeting of Primates, and is President of the Anglican Consultative Council. The contemporary Church of Ireland, despite having a number of High Church (often described as Anglo-Catholic) parishes, is generally on the Low Church end of the spectrum of world Anglicanism. Historically, it had little of the difference in churchmanship between parishes characteristic of other Anglican churches, although a number of markedly liberal, High Church or Evangelical parishes have developed in recent decades. It was the second province of the Anglican Communion after the Anglican Church of New Zealand (1857) to adopt, on its 1871 disestablishment, synodical government. It was also one of the first provinces to begin ordaining women to the priesthood (1991).

==== Relation with the GAFCON movement ====
GAFCON Ireland was launched on 21 April 2018, in Belfast, with 320 attendees from the Republic of Ireland and Northern Ireland. International speakers included Archbishops Peter Jensen (retired Archbishop of Sydney) and Gregory Venables (Primate of the Anglican Church of South America). The Church of Ireland was represented at GAFCON III, held on 17–22 June 2018 in Jerusalem, by a six-member delegation which included two bishops; Ferran Glenfield of Kilmore, Elphin and Ardagh and Harold Miller of Down and Dromore. Their participation was criticised by some members of the Church of Ireland. The Church of Ireland is not a member of GAFCON and the church communicated that attendance by clergy was unofficial in "a personal capacity" and the General Synod has voted against GAFCON's statement on the Lambeth Conference. GAFCON supporters refuted their critics' claims, saying that they endorse Lambeth 1.10 resolution on human sexuality, which is still the official stance of the Church of Ireland, but has been rejected by the liberal churches of the Anglican Communion. The Rev. Charles Raven stated: "the charge that GAFCON is a breakaway or separatist group is not supported by the evidence. It is a movement of reform and revitalisation which has enabled faithful Anglicans to remain within the Communion, especially in North America and Brazil. While being clear that participation in its common life is based upon fidelity to the biblical gospel, not merely upon historic ties, the Jerusalem Statement and Declaration of 2008 says quite unequivocally that 'Our fellowship is not breaking away from the Anglican Communion'."

=== Ecumenical relations ===
Like many other Anglican churches, the Church of Ireland is a member of many ecumenical bodies, including the World Council of Churches, the Conference of European Churches, Churches Together in Britain and Ireland and the Irish Council of Churches. It is also a member of the Porvoo Communion.

=== Flags ===
St Patrick's flag

In 1999, the church voted to prohibit the flying of flags other than St Patrick's flag and the Flag of the Anglican Communion. However, the Union Flag continues to fly on many churches in Northern Ireland.

=== Publications ===
The church has an official website. Its journal is The Church of Ireland Gazette, which is notionally editorially independent, but the governing body of which is appointed by the church. Many parishes, dioceses, and other internal organizations also produce newsletters or other publications, as well as maintaining websites.

== Doctrine and practice ==
The centre of the Church of Ireland's teaching is the life, death and resurrection of Jesus Christ. The basic teachings of the church include:

- Chalcedonian Christology; Jesus Christ is fully human and fully God in one person. He died and was resurrected from the dead.
- Jesus provides the way of eternal life for those who believe.
- The Old and New Testaments of the Bible ("God's Word written") were written by people "under the inspiration of the Holy Spirit". The Apocrypha are additional books that are to be read, but not to determine doctrine. The Apocrypha of the King James version of the Bible constitutes the books of the Vulgate version that are present neither in the Hebrew Old Testament nor the Greek New Testament.
- The "two great and necessary" sacraments are Baptism and the Eucharist (also called Holy Communion and the Lord's Supper).
- Those "commonly called Sacraments that are not to be counted for Sacraments of the Gospel" are confirmation, ordination, marriage, reconciliation of a penitent and unction.
- Belief in heaven, hell and Jesus's return in glory.

The 16th-century apologist, Richard Hooker, posits that there are three sources of authority in Anglicanism: scripture, tradition, and reason. It is not known how widely accepted this idea is within Anglicanism. It is further posited that the three sources uphold and critique each other in a dynamic way. In Hooker's model, scripture is the primary means of arriving at doctrine; things stated plainly in scripture are accepted as true. Issues that are ambiguous are determined by tradition, which is checked by reason.

=== Modern doctrinal debates ===
==== Ordination of women ====
In recent decades, the church has ordained women to all offices. In 1984, the General Synod approved the ordination of women to the diaconate and, in 1987, the first woman, Katherine Poulton, was ordained as a deacon. In 1990, the church began ordaining women to the priesthood. The first two women ordained were Kathleen Margaret Brown and Irene Templeton. In 2013, the church appointed its first female bishop, Pat Storey.

==== Same-sex unions and LGBT clergy ====
The church has been divided over aspects of human sexuality. In 2002, the issue became pertinent as a rector provided a blessing for a lesbian couple. The denomination announced a period of discernment to allocate time to the perspectives within the discussion. In 2010, a congregation was recognised by the church for receiving an LGBTI award for offering services for LGBTI people. The Church of Ireland canon defines marriage as a union between one man and one woman, and does not perform same-sex marriages, but the church also supported the legal right of same-sex couples to register a civil marriage. Church of Ireland clergy are permitted to enter into same-sex civil partnerships as long as they are celibate and sexually abstinent.

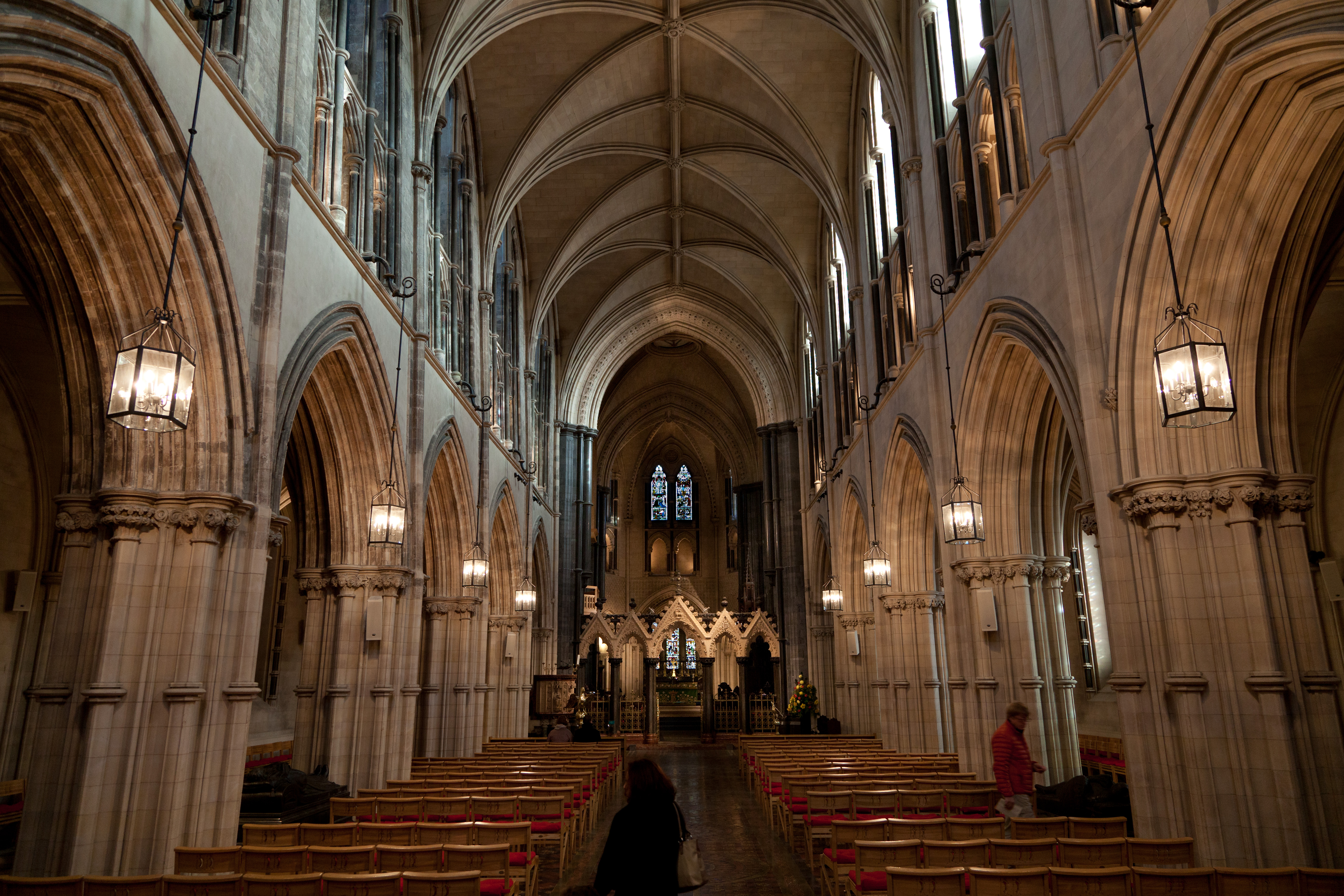
Interior of Christ Church Cathedral

Civil partnerships have been allowed since 2005. The church has no official position on civil unions. In 2008, "the Church of Ireland Pensions Board ha[d] confirmed that it will treat civil partners the same as spouses." The General Synod adopted the Pensions Board's policy in 2008. In 2011, a cleric in the Church of Ireland entered into a same-sex civil partnership with his bishop's permission. Assurances of sexual abstinence were not required from the cleric at the time. In 2012, the church's Clergy Pension Fund continued to recognise that "the pension entitlement of a member's registered civil partner will be the same as that of a surviving spouse." Regarding cohabitation, the church said that "any view of cohabitation has to be the intention of the couple to lifelong loyalty and faithfulness within their relationship." In 2004, then Archbishop John Neill said that the "Church would support the extension of legal rights on issues such as tax, welfare benefits, inheritance and hospital visits to cohabiting couples, both same gender and others." The church recognises four general viewpoints within the denomination ranging from opposition to acceptance toward same-gender relationships.

Prior to the referendum on same-sex marriage, the church remained neutral on the issue. In 2015, the Bishop of Cork, the Rt. Rev. Paul Colton, Bishop Michael Burrows of Cashel, and two retired archbishops of Dublin endorsed same-sex marriage. While voting "no" on gay marriage, Bishop Pat Storey endorsed civil unions. Also, 55 clergy signed a letter supporting the blessing of same-sex couples. In its pastoral letter, the church reiterated that, presently, church marriages are only for heterosexual couples, but that clergy may offer prayers for same-sex couples. When asked about clergy entering into civil same-sex marriages, the letter stated that "all are free to exercise their democratic entitlements once they are enshrined in legislation. However, members of the clergy, are further bound by the Ordinal and by the authority of the General Synod of the Church of Ireland." Services of Thanksgiving for same-sex marriage have taken place in congregations; for example, St Audoen's Church hosted "a service of thanksgiving" for same-sex marriage. LGBTI services are also allowed by the Diocese of Cork, Cloyne and Ross.

REFORM Ireland, a conservative lobby, has criticised the official letter as "a dangerous departure from confessing Anglicanism" and continues to oppose same-sex marriage recognition. Reflecting division, the church deferred its report on same-sex marriage to listen to all voices. The Church of Ireland Gazette, although "editorially independent", endorsed a blessing rite for same-sex couples. Many congregations, including cathedrals, have become publicly affirming of LGBTI rights. A church report has determined that "the moral logic underpinning the negative portrayal of same-sex eroticism in Scripture does not directly address committed, loving, consecrated same-sex relationships today". In 2017, the General Synod considered a proposal to request for public services of thanksgiving for same-sex couples, but the proposal was not passed; the church's select committee on human sexuality recommended that the bishops continue to study the issues. There were 176 votes against the motion to request public services, 146 in favour, and 24 abstentions. The Bishop of Cork, Paul Colton, declared his support for same-sex marriage ceremonies in the Church of Ireland. Three dioceses, the United Diocese of Tuam, Limerick, and Killaloe, the Diocese of Dublin and Glendalough, and the Diocese of Cashel, Ferns, and Ossory have voted to support the blessing of civil same-sex marriages, requesting that a motion be considered by the General Synod.

=== Liturgical issues ===
==== Irish language ====
The first translation of the Book of Common Prayer into Irish was published in 1606. An Irish translation of the revised prayer book of 1662 was published in 1712.

The Church of Ireland has its own Irish language body, Cumann Gaelach na hEaglaise ("Irish Guild of the Church"). This was founded in 1914 to bring together members of the Church of Ireland interested in the Irish language and Gaelic culture and to promote the Irish language within the Church of Ireland. The guild aims to link its programmes with the Irish language initiatives which have been centred round Christ Church Cathedral. It holds services twice a month in Irish.

From 1926 to 1995, the church had its own Irish-language teacher training college, Coláiste Moibhí. Today, there are a number of interdenominational Gaelscoileanna (schools where Irish-medium education is applied).

== See also ==
- Anglo-Irish
- Church of England
- Scottish Episcopal Church
- Episcopal Church (United States)
- Church in Wales
- Bishops' Selection Conference
- Protestantism in Ireland
- Religion in Northern Ireland
- Religion in the Republic of Ireland

== Sources ==
- Barlett, Thomas (1993). "The Catholic Question in the Eighteenth Century". History Ireland. 1 (1).
- Church of Ireland. "Irish and Universal". Ireland.anglican.com.
- Clarke, Aidan (1989). "Varieties of Uniformity: The First Century of the Church of Ireland". Studies in Church History. 25: 105–122. doi:10.1017/S0424208400008615. S2CID 155239989.
- Condon, Mary (1964). "The Irish Church and the Reform Ministries". Journal of British Studies. 3 (2): 120–142. doi:10.1086/385484. S2CID 144148582.
- Diamond, Ciaran (2009). "John Leslie; 1571-1671". Oxford Dictionary of National Biography (online ed.). Oxford University Press. doi:10.1093/ref:odnb/16494. (Subscription, Wikipedia Library access or UK public library membership required.)
- Flanagan, Marie Therese (2005). Ó Cróinín, Dáibhí (ed.). High-kings with opposition, 1072–1166 in 'A New History of Ireland' Volume I. Oxford University Press. ISBN 978-0-19-922665-8.
- Flaningam, John (1977). "The Occasional Conformity Controversy: Ideology and Party Politics, 1697-1711". Journal of British Studies. 17 (1): 38–62. doi:10.1086/385711. JSTOR 175691. S2CID 143833517.
- Flechner, Roy (2019). Saint Patrick Retold: The Legend and History of Ireland's Patron Saint. Princeton University Press. ISBN 978-0-691-18464-7.
- Harris, Tim (2006). Restoration: Charles II and His Kingdoms, 1660–1685. Penguin. ISBN 978-0-14-026465-4.
- Harris, Tim (2007). Revolution; the Great Crisis of the British Monarchy 1685–1720. Penguin. ISBN 978-0-14-101652-8.
- James, Francis Godwin (1979). "The Church of Ireland in the Early 18th Century". Historical Magazine of the Protestant Episcopal Church. 48 (4).
- Higgins, Ian (2014). MacInnes, Alan; Graham, Lesley; German, Kieran (eds.). Jonathan Swift's Memoirs of a Jacobite in 'Living with Jacobitism, 1690–1788: The Three Kingdoms and Beyond'. Routledge. ISBN 978-1-84893-470-2.
- Llywelyn, Morgan (2020). 1014: Brian Boru & the Battle for Ireland. Courier Dover. ISBN 978-0-486-84200-4.
- Muldoon, Andrew (2000). "Recusants, Church-Papists, and "Comfortable" Missionaries: Assessing the Post-Reformation English Catholic Community". The Catholic Historical Review. 86 (2): 242–257. doi:10.1353/cat.2000.0188. JSTOR 25025711. S2CID 156408188.
- Murray, James (2009). Enforcing the English Reformation in Ireland: Clerical Resistance and Political Conflict in the Diocese of Dublin, 1534 – 1590. Cambridge University Press. ISBN 978-0-521-77038-5.
- O'Brian, Conor Cruise (2015). The Great Melody. Faber & Faber. ISBN 978-0-571-32566-5.
- O'Mahony, Eion (2010). "Religious Practice and Values in Ireland A summary of European Values Study 4th wave data" (PDF). Council for Research & Development.
- Overton, J. H. (2018) [1902]. The Nonjurors: Their Lives, Principles, and Writings. Wentworth Press. ISBN 978-0-530-23733-6.
- Pearce, Edward, ed. (2005). The Diaries of Charles Greville. Pimlico. ISBN 978-1-84413-404-5.
- Richardson, Joseph (2000). "Archbishop William King (1650-1729): 'Church Tory and State Whig'?". Eighteenth-Century Ireland / Iris an Dá Chultúr. 15: 54–76. doi:10.3828/eci.2000.6. JSTOR 30071442. S2CID 256128026.
- Sheehy, Maurice P (1961). "The Bull 'Laudabiliter': A Problem in Medieval Diplomatique and History". Galway Archaeological and Historical Society. 29 (3/4): 45–70. JSTOR 25535386.
- Simms, J. G. (1970). "The Bishops' Banishment Act of 1697 (9 Will. III, C. 1)". Irish Historical Studies. 17 (66): 185–199. doi:10.1017/S0021121400111381. JSTOR 30005134. S2CID 191800775.
- Wallace, Raymond Leslie (1949). The Articles of the Church of Ireland 1615 (unpublished doctoral thesis). University of Edinburgh.
- Walshe, Helen Coburn (November 1989). "Enforcing the Elizabethan Settlement: The Vicissitudes of Hugh Brady, Bishop of Meath, 1563–84". Irish Historical Studies. 26 (104): 352–376. doi:10.1017/S0021121400010117. JSTOR 30008693. S2CID 159568621.
- Young, Francis (2020). "Making medieval Ireland English". History Today. 70 (3).
