= Primacy of Ireland =

Christian church offices in Ireland

The Primacy of Ireland belongs to the diocesan bishops of the Irish dioceses with highest precedence. The Archbishop of Armagh is titled Primate of All Ireland and the Archbishop of Dublin Primate of Ireland, signifying that they are the senior clerics on the island of Ireland, the Primate of All Ireland being the more senior. The titles are used by both the Catholic Church in Ireland and Church of Ireland.

Primate is a title of honour, and in the Middle Ages there was an intense rivalry between Armagh and Dublin as to seniority. The Archbishop of Armagh's leading status was based on the belief that his see was founded by St. Patrick, making Armagh the ecclesiastical capital of Ireland. On the other hand, Dublin, after the Anglo-Norman invasion of Ireland, was the administrative centre of the country, and its largest city. The dispute between the two archbishoprics was settled by Pope Innocent VI in 1353, with occasional brief controversy since. The distinction mirrors that in the Church of England between the Primate of All England, the Archbishop of Canterbury, and the Primate of England, the Archbishop of York.

== Pre-Reformation ==
The episcopal see of Dublin was created in the eleventh century, when Dublin was a Norse city state. Its first bishop, Dúnán (or Donatus), was described at his death as "chief bishop of the Foreigners". From the first, Dublin had close ties to the see of Canterbury. The fifth bishop of Dublin, Gregory, was only a subdeacon when he was elected bishop by what Aubrey Gwynn called "the Norse party in the city". He was sent to England where he was consecrated by Archbishop Ralph of Canterbury, but on his return, he was prevented from entering his see by those who wanted Dublin integrated with the Irish hierarchy. A compromise was reached by which Gregory was recognised as bishop of Dublin, while he in turn accepted the authority of Cellach, archbishop of Armagh, as primate. In 1152, the Synod of Kells divided Ireland between the four archdioceses of Armagh, Dublin, Cashel and Tuam. Gregory was appointed archbishop of Dublin. The papal legate, Cardinal John Paparo, also appointed the archbishop of Armagh "as Primate over the other bishops, as was fitting."

Henry de Loundres, archbishop of Dublin from 1213 to 1228, obtained a bull from Pope Honorius III prohibiting any archbishop from having the cross carried before him (a symbol of authority) in the archdiocese of Dublin without the consent of the archbishop of Dublin. A century later, this bull led to a confrontation between Richard FitzRalph, archbishop of Armagh, and Alexander de Bicknor, archbishop of Dublin, when FitzRalph, acting on letters of King Edward III specifically allowing him to do so, entered Dublin in 1349 "with the cross erect before him". He was opposed by the prior of Kilmainham on the instructions of Bicknor, and forced to withdraw to Drogheda. On Bicknor's death, and the succession of John de St Paul to the see of Dublin, King Edward revoked his letters to FitzRalph and forbade the primate to exercise his jurisdiction in Dublin. In 1353 the matter was referred to Avignon. There Pope Innocent VI, acting on the advice of the College of Cardinals, ruled that "each of these prelates should be Primate; while, for the distinction of style, the Primate of Armagh should entitle himself Primate of All Ireland, but the Metropolitan of Dublin should subscribe himself Primate of Ireland."

== Church of Ireland ==
On 20 October 1551, the Protestant Edward VI and the Privy Council of England transferred the Anglican primacy from George Dowdall of Armagh to George Browne of Dublin, as the former opposed the Reformation in Ireland, which the latter advanced by introducing the 1549 Prayer Book and destroying the Bachal Isu, both a Catholic relic and a symbol of Armagh's primacy. The Catholic Mary I on 12 October 1553, shortly after succeeding Edward, restored Dowdall and Armagh to primacy. In the 1630s, Lancelot Bulkeley of Dublin argued that Protestant Edward's decree ought to be accepted and Catholic Mary's annulled, but in 1634 the Lord Deputy of Ireland, Thomas Wentworth, felt that without stronger evidence the primacy should remain with Armagh. The Church Temporalities Act 1833 reduced Tuam and Cashel and Emly from archdioceses to dioceses, leaving no archbishops other than the two primates.

== Catholic ==
In 1672 Catholic archbishop Peter Talbot of Dublin disputed the right of Oliver Plunkett of Armagh to preside at a synod in Dublin; Talbot claimed King Charles II had given him a Commission. Both wrote tracts supporting their claims, and appealed to the Pope in Rome. While John D'Alton accepts the assertion that Rome ruled in favour of Armagh, Tomás Ó Fiaich says no ruling was made. There was a further dispute in the 1720s when a Dublin priest, censured by his own archbishop, appealed to Hugh MacMahon of Armagh, who reversed the censure. Rome investigated but made no decision. In 1802, John Troy said that, to avoid controversy, neither archbishop exercised jurisdiction outside his own metropolitan province.

In 1852 Paul Cullen, the archbishop of Armagh, was translated to Dublin, and in 1866 he, rather than his successor in Armagh, was made the first Irish cardinal. Cullen's successor in Dublin, Edward MacCabe, was also made cardinal in 1882, but after his death the cardinalate went to Armagh. Tomás Ó Fiaich and William Conway suggest that the period of Cullen and MacCabe's primacy was the only time during which "the leadership of the Irish Church" was in Dublin rather than Armagh; and the motivation was the necessity of close contact with the Dublin Castle administration in the period after Catholic Emancipation; the church's situation had mostly stabilised by the end of the century.

Since 1885, Irish voting members of the College of Cardinals have been archbishops of Armagh rather than Dublin, except when Desmond Connell was appointed in 2001 ahead of Seán Brady. This was somewhat unexpected, and attributed to Connell's experience in the Roman Curia. The younger Brady was made a cardinal in 2007, by which time Connell had passed the 80-year age limit for voting that applies in the College.

== See also ==
- Roman Catholic Archdiocese of Armagh
- Archbishop of Armagh (Church of Ireland)
- Archdiocese of Dublin (Catholic)
- Archbishop of Dublin (Church of Ireland)

== Sources ==
- Brenan, Michael John (1840). An Ecclesiastical History of Ireland: From the Introduction of Christianity Into that Country, to the Year 1829, Volume 1. Dublin: John Coyne.
- Carew, Patrick Joseph (1838). An Ecclesiastical History of Ireland: From the Introduction of Christianity Into that Country, to the Commencement of the Thirteenth Century. Philadelphia: P.J. Fallon.
- D'Alton, John (1838). The Memoirs of the Archbishops of Dublin. Dublin: Hodges and Smith.
- Gwynn, Aubrey (1992). O'Brien, Gerard (ed.). The Irish Church in the Eleventh and Twelfth Centuries. Dublin: Four Courts Press. ISBN 978-1-85182-095-5.
- Killen, William Dool (1875). The Ecclesiastical History of Ireland : From the Earliest Period to the Present Times, Volume I. London: Macmillan.
- MacGeoghegan, James (1849). The History of Ireland, Ancient and Modern. Translated by O'Kelly, Patrick. Dublin: James Duffy.
- Ó Fiaich, Tomás (2006). "The Primacy in the Irish Church". Seanchas Ardmhacha: Journal of the Armagh Diocesan Historical Society. 21 (1): 1–23. ISSN 0488-0196. JSTOR 29742787.
