= Richard Rutledge Kane (senior) =

Richard Rutledge Kane (1841–1898) was a Church of Ireland minister, an outspoken Irish unionist and Orangeman, and an early patron of the Gaelic League. A dominant personality in the life of Belfast, his funeral procession in 1898 was purportedly one of the largest seen in the city.

== Anglican clergyman ==
Kane was born in Newtownstewart in the north-west of County Tyrone and was raised a Methodist, but joined the established Church of Ireland as a teenager. He was ordained as a minister in 1869, and held various clerical positions before graduating from Trinity College Dublin BA and LLB in 1877, MAin 1880, and LLDin 1882. In 1882, he was appointed rector at Christ Church, Belfast, a position he held until his death. Christ Church in College Square had been erected in 1833 to serve "the poorer classes of Protestants.

== Unionist and Orangeman ==
Kane was a strict Protestant, and regularly denounced what he perceived as the sins and errors of the Roman Catholic Church. Politically he was a conservative and unionist. From 1885, he was the Orange Order County Grand Master of Belfast, and was a Deputy Grand Chaplain of the Grand Orange Lodge of Ireland. He was also a Vice-President of both the Belfast Conservative Association and the Ulster Loyalist Anti-Repeal Union.

Kane toured Ireland and England and, hosted by an extensive Orange-Order network in Canada and the U.S., seeking support and understanding for unionist resistance to Irish home rule.After the first Home Rule Bill was defeated in the House of Commons on 8 June 1886, Irish Home-Rule MPs in the House accused Kane and his Presbyterian counterpart, Hugh "Roaring" Hanna, of fomenting the violent rioting in Belfast that followed. When revellers, celebrating the defeat, began attacking Catholic homes and businesses, police reinforcements were sent in from other parts of Ireland and many of these were Catholic. Kane did not counter the rumour that they were on a punitive mission for the government, and declared that, unless they were disarmed, 2000,000 armed Orangemen would relieve them of their weapons.

As a signal of determination of northern Protestants to resist the restoration of an Irish parliament in Dublin, in advance of the second bill Kane helped organise in Belfast the Ulster Unionist Convention of 1892, 12,000 delegates, elected by Unionist associations across the country, and several thousands spectators, attended.

Kane opposed the Irish National Land League of Charles Stewart Parnell and Michael Davitt, citing the violence employed in the Land War as an augur of what Catholic-majority rule would entail. The nationalist press referred to Kane as "the Shooting Rector", a reference to his purported suggestion in 1880 that for every landlord killed, a priest should be shot.

== Patron of the Gaelic League ==
At the same, in 1895 Kane was a patron of the first branch in Belfast of the Gaelic League, which in the decade to follow was to become indissolubly linked with Irish nationalism.As a patron of the League's promotion of the Irish language, he was in company of Henry Henry, the Catholic Bishop of Down and Connor, but also Thomas Welland, the Church of Ireland Bishop of Down, Connor and Dromore, and George Raphael Buick, Moderator of the Presbyterian Church and branch vice president. The Branch president was Kane's parishioner, Dr. John St Clair Boyd.

Kane ensured that the Ulster Unionist Convention was draped with the banner Erin go bragh--"Ireland forever"—but "there is no evidence he spoke the language. But it is nonetheless said that Kane signed the minutes of lodge meetings in Irish. According to James Winder Good, he said, "My Orangeism does not make me less proud to be an O’Cahan" (a reference to the Irish origin of his family's name).

== Commemoration ==
Kane’s funeral in November 1898 was reputedly "one of the largest the city had ever seen, with an estimated sixty thousand people watching the funeral procession". A memorial at the Clifton Street Orange Hall over whose opening he had presided in 1885, commends Kane as a "Faithful Pastor, Gifted Orator, and Loyal Irish Patriot".

In 1931, John Frederick MacNeice, Church of Ireland Bishop of Cashel and Waterford, (and father of the poet Louis MacNeice), not an admirer of Kane's, wrote:

Much has happened since 1931, and it may be that no clergyman could again be a foremost political leader as Dr. Kane has been. For more ten years he was perhaps the most dominant personality in the public life of Belfast.

== Family ==
Kane had married Annie Greenslead, of Derry, with whom he had two sons and four daughters. His youngest son, Richard Rutledge Kane, was to serve through the 1920s as Resident Commissioner of the Solomon Islands Protectorate.
