= Godfrey Day =

Irish Anglican archbishop

The Right Reverend John Godfrey Fitzmaurice Day D.D.
- Archbishop of Armagh; Primate of All Ireland
- Church: Church of Ireland
- Diocese: Armagh
- Elected: 27 April 1938
- In office: 1938
- Predecessor: Charles D'Arcy
- Successor: John Gregg
- Previous post: Bishop of Ossory, Ferns and Leighlin (1920-1938)

Orders
- Ordination: 1899
- Consecration: 1 November 1920 by John Gregg

Personal details
- Born: 12 May 1874 Greystones, County Wicklow, Ireland
- Died: 26 September 1938 (aged 64) Dublin, Ireland
- Denomination: Anglican
- Parents: Maurice Day; Charlotte Francis Ottley
- Spouse: Cicely Langrishe
- Education: Pembroke College, Cambridge

John Godfrey Fitzmaurice Day (12 May 1874 – 26 September 1938) was a 20th-century Church of Ireland Archbishop.

== Biography ==
Day was born into an ecclesiastical family; his father was Maurice Day, later Bishop of Clogher. Educated at Oakham School and Pembroke College, Cambridge (whence he gained his Cambridge Master of Arts (MA Cantab)), he was ordained deacon in Worcester in 1897 and priest in London in 1899. He was a Missionary for the Cambridge Mission to Delhi until 1909 when he became Vicar of St Ann's Church, Dublin (1913–21). He became Bishop of Ossory, Ferns and Leighlin in 1920, holding the post for 18 years. In 1938 he was elected Archbishop of Armagh but died within two months of taking office, having at some point become a Doctor of Divinity (DD).

Religious titles
Preceded by John Gregg	Bishop of Ossory, Ferns and Leighlin; June 1920 – June 1938	Succeeded by Ford Tichbourne
Preceded by Charles D'Arcy	Archbishop of Armagh; June 1938 – September 1938	Succeeded by John Allen Fitzgerald Gregg
