= John Robinson (priest) =

The Very Reverend John Joseph Robinson

Dean of Belfast
- In office 1903–1911
- Preceded by: Charles D'Arcy
- Succeeded by: Charles Grierson

Personal details
- Born: 1852
- Died: 1916 (aged 64)
- Spouse: Henrietta Harriet née Lubbock
- Education: Trinity College, Dublin

John Joseph Robinson was Dean of Belfast in the first decades of the 20th century.

He was born in Dublin in 1852, educated at Trinity College, Dublin and ordained in 1875. His first post was in Stepney, London but he returned to Ireland in 1879 as curate of Saint Matthias’, Dublin. He was the incumbent at Killiskey and then Delgany. From 1900 to 1903 he was Treasurer of Christ Church Cathedral, Waterford when he became Vicar of Belfast and a year later Dean of the city’s cathedral. He resigned in 1911 and emigrated to Canada where he was Rector of Christ Church Alberta until his death in June 1916.

== Notes ==
Church of Ireland titles
| Preceded by Charles Frederick D'Arcy | Dean of Belfast; 1904– 1911 | Succeeded by Charles Thornton Primrose Grierson |
