= Charles Grierson =

Irish clergyman

The Right Reverend Charles Grierson
- Bishop of Down, Connor and Dromore
- In office: 1919–1934
- Other post: Dean of Belfast (1911–1919)

Personal details
- Born: 11 April 1857
- Died: 9 July 1935 (aged 78)
- Denomination: Church of Ireland
- Spouse: Blanche Caldwell née Bloomfield
- Education: Trinity College, Dublin

Charles Thornton Primrose Grierson was an eminent Irish clergyman in the first third of the 20th century. Gaining an MA, then ordained in 1881, he began his career with a curacy at Kells, after which he was Rector of Stradbally and then Seapatrick, County Down. Promotion to be Dean of St Anne's Cathedral, Belfast followed; after which he was elevated to the episcopate as the Bishop of Down, Connor and Dromore. Works. He contributed to the monumental "Dictionary of Christ and the Gospels" 1908 edited by Hastings.

Religious titles
Preceded by John Robinson	Dean of Belfast; 1911–1919	Succeeded by Thomas Collins
Preceded by Charles D'Arcy	Bishop of Down, Connor and Dromore; 1919–1934	Succeeded by John MacNeice
