= St. David's Church, Kilsallaghan =

Church in North County Dublin, Ireland

Coordinates: 53.4764375°N 6.3181815°W

St. David's Church, Kilsallaghan, is a Church of Ireland, church in north County Dublin.

Today the parish of Kilsallaghan is part of the Swords (St. Columba's), Donabate (St. Patrick's) and Kilsallaghan Union of Parishes (which includes Clonmethan, and Lusk) The present church was built in 1812, supported by the Board of First Fruits. In 1871 the parish was united with Swords, and in 1968 Donabate joined the United Parish.

The church contains stained glass windows by the artist Michael Healy (1873–1941). It had operated as the chapel for the castle at Kilsllaghan. An earlier priory existed in Kilsallaghan.

Up until the 17th century there was a chapel of ease at Chapel-Midway (as the name indicates roughly halfway between Kilsallaghan and St. Margaret's); the ruins of the chapel are within the walled graveyard, which is now managed by Fingal County Council, there has been the occasional interment even in recent years.

In 1864 Rev. Crofts Bullen, donated a piece of land for a nominal sum to facilitate the building of the first Kilcoskan National School.

== People associated with St. David's Church, Kilsallaghan ==
- Bishop John Gregg, served as Rector of Kilsallaghan.
- Archbishop Robert Gregg (son of John), was born in the rectory
- Brian Lenihan Jnr, the former government minister, is buried in the churchyard

=== Kilsallaghan, with Chapelmidway ===
- 1615. John Richmond (incumbent)
- 1623. John Byns.
- 1630. R. Worrall, A.M. (incumbent)
- 1662. Henry Brereton, while Rector of Santry
- 1680. Daniel Jackson.
- 1709. Charles Smyth.
- 1716. Peter Wybrants.
- 1732. Edward Leigh, D.D. (with Naul).
- 1759. E. I. Leigh, A.M., F.T.C.D.
- 1760. Philip Yorke.
- 1768. Edward Day, D.D.
- 1770. Henry Parish.
- 1770. Maurice Collis.
- 1801. Richard Straubenee Wolfe.
- 1803. Thomas Henry Kearney.
- 1806. Charles Wiley Doyle.
- 1829. John Gregg, A.B.
- 1836. Mark Perrin, A.M.
- 1840. Quinton Dick Hume, A.M.
- 1S49. John Colter MacDounell, A.B.
- 1854. Ralph Wylde.
- 1855. Annesley P. Hughes, A.B.
- 1857. Theophilus Bennett, A.B.
- 1865. William Crofts Bullen

Kilsallaghan was United with Swords in 1871

- 1871 Thomas Twigg, A.M., who had been vicar of Swords becoming the Prebend and Vicar of the United Parish
