= Thomas Welland =

Irish Anglican bishop

The Rt Revd Thomas James Welland

Bishop of Down, Connor and Dromore
- In office 1892–1907

Personal details
- Born: 31 March 1830 Dublin
- Died: 29 July 1907 (aged 77) Holywood
- Spouse: Anna née Brooke
- Education: Trinity College, Dublin

Thomas James Welland (31 March 1830 – 29 July 1907) was an Irish Anglican bishop.

Welland was born in county Dublin (his father Joseph being an architect) and was educated at Trinity College, Dublin (BA mathematics 1854, MA 1857, BD & DD 1890) and ordained in 1854. He began his ordained ministry as a curate at Carlow, after which he was vicar of Painstown and then assistant chaplain of the Mariners’ Church in Kingstown. He was the clerical secretary of the Jews’ Society, Ireland from 1862 to 1866 and then assistant chaplain at Christ Church, Dublin until 1870. He then became the incumbent at St Thomas's Belfast from 1870 until his ordination to the episcopate as the Bishop of Down, Connor and Dromore in 1892.

In 1895, he became a patron of the first branch in Belfast of the Gaelic League. He was in company of Henry Henry, the Catholic Bishop of Down and Connor, but also Richard Rutledge Kane the Church of Ireland rector of Christ Church in Belfast and the city's Orange Order Grand Master, and George Raphael Buick, Moderator of the Presbyterian Church.

Welland died in post on 29 July 1907.

Church of Ireland titles
| Preceded by William Reeves | Bishop of Down, Connor and Dromore; 1892–1907 | Succeeded by John Baptist Crozier |
