= John St. Clair Boyd =

Irish doctor and Gaelic League activist (1858–1918)

John St. Clair Boyd (1858–1918) was an Irish gynaecologist, surgeon and first president of the Belfast Gaelic League.

== Biography ==
Boyd was born at Cultra House, Holywood, Co. Down as the only son of John Kane Boyd, co-proprietor of the Blackstaff Mill. Boyd, a member of the Church of Ireland, was born in Holywood, County Down and studied medicine at Queen's College, in 1886. Belfast. He worked for a time in Birmingham and returned in 1888 to Belfast to work at the Hospital for Sick Children, Queen Street, as assistant surgeon. He later became gynaecologist at the Ulster Hospital for Children and Women.

In 1895, he became the first President of the first Belfast branch of the Gaelic League, formed in east Belfast under the patronage of other committed unionists: Boyd's minister, the Rev. John Baptiste Crozier, and Orange Order Grand Master, the Rev. Richard Rutledge Kane.In its early years, Boyd may have been the League's largest financial donor. He was also involved with the Dublin Pipers' Club and adjudicated at musical festivals. In the 1890s he was a member of the Belfast Naturalists' Field Club, for which he wrote a number of articles.

Boyd married Helen Anne Cochran Macadam on 1 November 1887 at Duddingston Parish Church, Edinburgh.
