= John Phair =

Anglican bishop

John Percy Phair (1 November 1876 – 28 December 1967) was a 20th-century Anglican bishop.

John Percy Phair was born in Roscommon, the son of a farmer Peter Phair and Martha Phair, of Ram Park, Castlerea, County Roscommon. He had younger brothers Edgar and Casper.

Educated at Trinity College Dublin, Phair was ordained in 1900. He held curacies in Conwal, Church Hill, County Donegal and Monkstown, Dublin and incumbencies in St Catherine's, Thomas Street, Dublin and Christ Church Leeson Park. He was Rural Dean of Rathdowney and then Dean of Ossory (1923–1940) before becoming Bishop of Ossory, Ferns and Leighlin in 1940. He retired in 1961; and died on 28 December 1967.

Phair married Alice Maude Banks (1883–1945) from Belfast. They had several children: Kenneth Meade Phair, Sheila Maude Phair, and Rev. Edgar Nevill Phair. Following the death of his first wife, Phair married Pauline Beryl Eustace (1906–90) from Hillside Farm, Hampstead, Glasnevin, on 30 July 1958.

Religious titles
Preceded by Ford Tichborne	Bishop of Ossory, Ferns and Leighlin; June 1940 – June 1961	Succeeded by Henry McAdoo
