= Maurice Day (bishop of Clogher) =

Maurice Day (2 September 1843 – 27 May 1923) was an Anglican bishop in the early 20th century.

He was born on Valentia Island, County Kerry on 2 September 1843 into an ecclesiastical family, the son of the Very Reverend John Godfrey Day, sometime Dean of Ardfert, and was educated at Trinity College, Dublin.

He held curacies at St Luke's, Cork and then St Matthias's, Dublin. He was Vicar of Greystones and then Killiney. In 1894 he returned to his old parish in Dublin as Rector, staying until 1905 when he became Dean of Ossory. He was appointed Bishop of Clogher in December 1907, and consecrated in January 1908 and died in post on 27 May 1923.

He married Charlotte Francis, the daughter of Herbert Taylor Ottley of Regent's Park. They had three sons and a daughter. A son John Godfrey Fitzmaurice Day was elected Archbishop of Armagh in 1938.

== Notes ==
Religious titles
Preceded by Charles D'Arcy	Bishop of Clogher; 1908 –1923	Succeeded by James MacManaway
