= John Bernard (bishop) =

Irish Anglican clergyman (1860–1927)

The Right Reverend John Bernard D.D.
- Archbishop of Dublin; Primate of Ireland
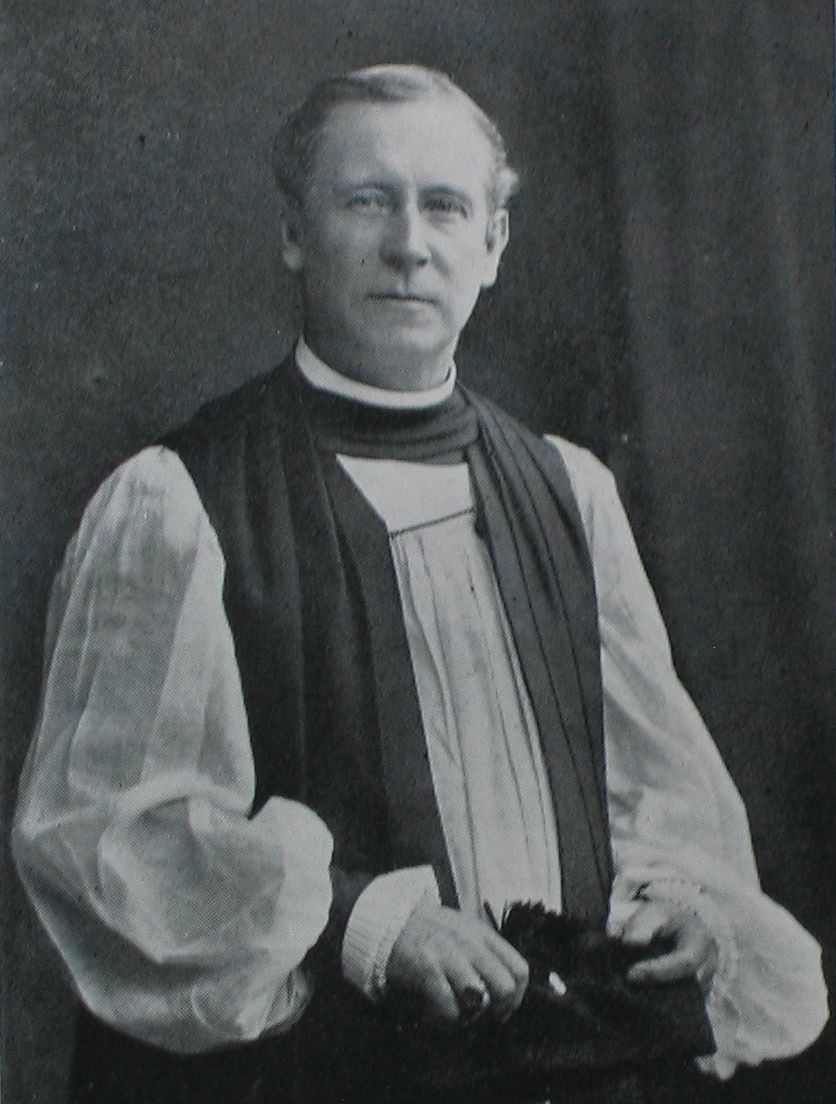
- Church: Church of Ireland
- Diocese: Dublin and Glendalough
- Elected: 7 October 1915
- In office: 1915–1919
- Predecessor: Joseph Peacocke
- Successor: Charles D'Arcy
- Other posts: 35th Provost of Trinity College (1919–1927)
- Previous post: Bishop of Ossory, Ferns and Leighlin (1911–1915)

Orders
- Consecration: 25 July 1911 by Joseph Peacocke

Personal details
- Born: 27 November 1860 Raniganj, British Raj
- Died: 29 August 1927 (aged 66) Dublin, Ireland
- Denomination: Anglican
- Spouse: Maude Nannie Bernard (m. 1885)
- Children: 4
- Education: Trinity College, Dublin (B.A., 1880)

John Bernard

35th Provost of Trinity College Dublin
- In office 1 August 1919 – 30 July 1927
- Preceded by: John Pentland Mahaffy
- Succeeded by: Edward Gwynn

John Henry Bernard, PC (27 July 1860 – 29 August 1927) was an Irish Church of Ireland clergyman who was Bishop of Ossory, Ferns and Leighlin from 1911 to 1915, Archbishop of Dublin from 1915 to 1919, and 35th Provost of Trinity College Dublin from 1919 to 1927.

== Biography ==
Bernard was born in Raniganj, British India. He was elected a scholar of Trinity College, Dublin in 1879, graduated with a B.A. degree in mathematics in 1880. He was elected a Fellow there in 1884, and was later a member of the council of the university, where he held the office of Archbishop King's Lecturer of Divinity from 1888 to 1902.

He was appointed treasurer of St Patrick's Cathedral, Dublin, by the Dean Henry Jellett in 1897. On Jellett's death, in December 1901, Bernard became a favourite to succeed him as Dean, a position to which he was elected by the chapter of the cathedral 6 February 1902. He served as such until 1911, when he was appointed Bishop of Ossory, Ferns and Leighlin. In 1915 he was appointed Church of Ireland Archbishop of Dublin, serving until 1919.

A prolific scholar in many fields, including Church history, theology and philosophy, he was the president of the Royal Irish Academy from 1916 to 1921 and Provost of Trinity College Dublin from 1919 to 1927. He was a member of the Board of National Education in Ireland, in which capacity he served as examiner of mathematics in the 1880s. He was regarded as a Unionist, representing the interests of unionism as a delegate to the 1917–18 Irish Convention.

Bernard married his cousin Maude Nannie Bernard in 1885; they had two sons and two daughters (Parker (2005): 73). In April 1915 his son, Lieutenant Robert Bernard of the 1st Battalion of the Royal Dublin Fusiliers was killed in action during the Gallipoli Campaign. He is commemorated at V Beach Cemetery by the Commonwealth War Graves Commission.

== Selected works ==
=== Books ===
- Bernard, John Henry (1920). Dogma and criticism. London: Longmans, Green, & Co. p. 38 p.
- ——— (1922). The Bernards of Kerry. Dublin: The Author, printed by The University Press.
- ——— (1924). The cathedral church of Saint Patrick : a history & description of the building, with a short account of the deans. London: G. Bell. xii, 88 p.
- ——— (1928). A. H. McNeile (ed.). A critical and exegetical commentary on the Gospel according to St. John. Edinburgh: T. & T. Clark. xii, 88 p.

=== Edited by ===
- Butler, Joseph (1900). ——— (ed.). The works of Bishop Butler; a new edition with introduction and notes by J. H. Bernard. London: Macmillan & Co.
- Kant, Immanuel (1914). ——— (ed.). Kant's Critique of judgement / translated with introduction and notes by J. H. Bernard (2nd ed, rev. ed.). London: Macmillan & Co. xlviii, 429 p.

== Bibliography ==
- Parker, Sarah (2005). Grace & Favour: The Hampton Court Palace Community 1750–1950. Hampton Court Palace: Historic Royal Palaces.
- Murray, Robert H. (1931). Archbishop Bernard: Professor, Prelate and Provost. SPCK, London; Hodges, Figgis & Co., Dublin; The Macmillan Co., New York & Toronto.

Church of Ireland titles
Preceded by Henry Jellett	Dean of St. Patrick's Cathedral, Dublin; 1902–1911	Succeeded by Charles Thomas Ovenden
Preceded by Charles Frederick D'Arcy	Bishop of Ossory, Ferns and Leighlin; 1911–1915	Succeeded by John Allen Fitzgerald Gregg
Preceded by Joseph Ferguson Peacocke	Archbishop of Dublin; 1915–1919	Succeeded by Charles Frederick D'Arcy
Academic offices
Preceded by John Pentland Mahaffy	Provost of Trinity College Dublin; 1919–1927	Succeeded by Edward Gwynn
