= St Edmund's Church, Coolkelure =

Anglican church in County Cork, Ireland

Coordinates: 51°43′59″N 9°11′21″W

St Edmund's Church
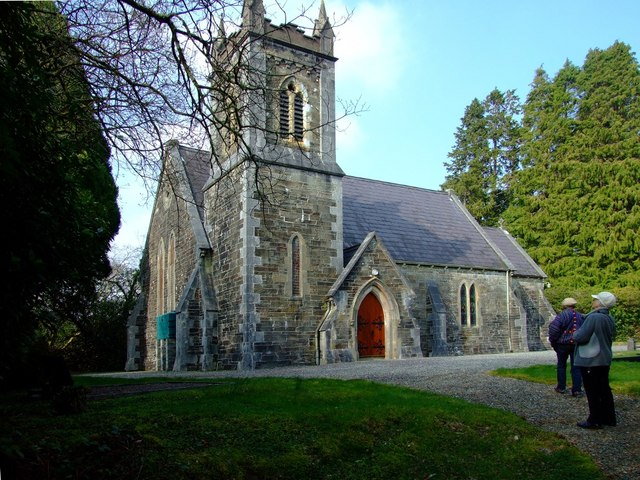
- St Edmund's Church
- Country: Ireland
- Denomination: Church of Ireland

Architecture
- Architect: Henry Hill
- Completed: 1865

St Edmund's Church is a small Gothic Revival Anglican church located in the townland of Coolkelure, County Cork, Ireland. It was completed in 1865. It is dedicated to Edmund the Martyr. It is part of the civil parish of Fanlobbus in the Diocese of Cork, Cloyne, and Ross.

== History ==
Built in 1865, St Edmund's church replaced a school building which had been licensed for worship since 1843. The construction of St Edmund's was supported by Bishop John Gregg and a local landowner, Colonel E.A. Shuldham, each of which contributed IR£500 to the church's construction.

Cliff Jeffers has served as rector to the parish since 2014.

== Architecture ==
The church was designed by Cork architect Henry Hill. The building features a three-bay nave.
