= Bishop of Ossory, Ferns and Leighlin =

The Bishop of Ossory, Ferns and Leighlin was the Ordinary of the Church of Ireland diocese of Ossory, Ferns and Leighlin in the Ecclesiastical Province of Dublin. The diocese consisted of counties Kilkenny, Carlow, Laois and Wexford in Ireland.

== History ==
Under the Church Temporalities (Ireland) Act 1833 (3 & 4 Will. 4. c. 37), the bishopric was formed when the bishopric of Ossory merged with the bishopric of Ferns and Leighlin on 12 July 1835. Over the next one hundred and forty-two years, there were twelve bishops of the united diocese. In 1977, the see merged with bishopric of Cashel and Waterford to form the united bishopric of Cashel and Ossory.

== List of bishops of Ossory, Ferns and Leighlin ==
Bishops of Ossory, Ferns and Leighlin
From	Until	Ordinary	Notes
1835	1841	Robert Fowler	Appointed bishop of Ossory in 1813, became bishop of Ossory, Ferns and Leighlin when the dioceses were united on 12 July 1835; died 31 December 1841
1842	1874	James Thomas O'Brien	Nominated 24 February and consecrated 20 March 1842; died 12 December 1874
1874	1878	Robert Samuel Gregg	Elected 4 March and consecrated 30 March 1875; translated to Cork, Cloyne and Ross 4 July 1878
1878	1897	William Pakenham Walsh	Elected 30 August and consecrated 29 September 1878; resigned 30 September 1897; died 30 July 1902
1897	1907	John Baptist Crozier	Elected 20 October and consecrated 30 November 1897; translated to Down, Connor and Dromore 26 September 1907
1907	1911	Charles Frederick D'Arcy	Translated from Clogher; elected 5 November 1907; translated to Down, Connor and Dromore 29 March 1911
1911	1915	John Henry Bernard	Elected 14 June and consecrated 25 July 1911; translated to Dublin 7 October 1915
1915	1920	John Allen Fitzgerald Gregg	Elected 20 November and consecrated 28 December 1915; translated to Dublin 20 September 1920
1920	1938	John Godfrey FitzMaurice Day	Elected 15 June and consecrated 1 November 1920; translated to Armagh 27 April 1938
1938	1940	Ford Tichborne	Elected 1 March and consecrated 24 June 1938; died 18 February 1940
1940	1961	John Percy Phair	Elected 13 March and consecrated 11 June 1940; resigned 31 December 1961
1962	1977	Henry Robert McAdoo	Elected 31 January and consecrated 11 March 1962; translated to Dublin 19 April 1977
In 1977, the see became part of the united bishopric of Cashel and Ossory
