= Thomas O'Brien (bishop) =

Irish clergyman

James Thomas O'Brien (1792–1874), was an Irish clergyman. He was Church of Ireland Bishop of Ossory, Ferns and Leighlin from 1842 to 1874.

== Early life ==
O'Brien, born at New Ross, County Wexford, in September 1792, was the son of Michael Burke O'Brien, a corporation officer, with the title of deputy sovereign of New Ross, who died in 1826. His mother, Dorothy, was the daughter of Thomas Kough. The father, who came originally from County Clare, was descended, although himself a Protestant, from a Roman Catholic branch of the great O'Brien family, which had been deprived of its property by the penal laws; he was well educated, but more imprudent than provident.

The son was educated at the endowed school of New Ross, and entered Trinity College Dublin, as a pensioner in November 1810. A portion of the cost of his education was defrayed by the borough of New Ross; in September 1826 he refunded the amount, £116, and was voted the freedom of the borough and a gold box. O'Brien obtained a scholarship at Trinity College in 1813, graduated B.A., and took the gold medal in 1815. He was especially distinguished in mathematics.

== Career ==
In 1820, O'Brien obtained a fellowship of Trinity, and took holy orders. He was awarded the degree of D.D. in 1830. He was one of the six Trinity College Dublin preachers from 1828 till 1842, and became Archbishop King's lecturer in 1833, when the divinity school in the college was thoroughly reorganised.

O'Brien maintained through life strongly evangelical views. He was well-read in the works of the reformers and their opponents, and in those of Bishop Butler and the Deists. In 1829 and 1830 his university sermons on the reformation doctrine of justification by faith became, when published in 1833, a standard work. As Archbishop King's lecturer, he lectured on ‘The Evidences of Religion, with a special reference to Sceptical and Infidel Attempts to invalidate them, and the Socinian controversy.’ Resigning his fellowship in 1836, he became vicar of Clonderhorka, Raphoe, but removed in 1837 to the vicarage of Arboe, Armagh, which he held till 1841. On 9 Nov. 1841 he was nominated Dean of Cork, and instituted on 5 Jan. 1842. On 9 March in the same year, he was raised by the Prime Minister, Sir Robert Peel to the bishopric of the united dioceses of Ossory, Ferns, and Leighlin.

O'Brien was a daily worshipper in St Canice's Cathedral, but he seldom preached or spoke except at the meetings of the church education society, of which he was an active champion. Naturally opposed to the Oxford Movement, he did what he could to stem its advance in sermons and writings between 1840 and 1850. In 1850 appeared his ‘Tractarianism: its present State, and the only Safeguard against it.’ To the disestablishment of the Church of Ireland O'Brien maintained a well-sustained resistance, and Archbishop Trench acknowledged much aid from his advice in the course of the struggle. When disestablishment came, O'Brien helped to reorganise the church, and moderated the zeal of his evangelical friends in their efforts to revise the prayer book in accordance with their own predilections. O'Brien died at 49 Thurloe Square, London, 12 December 1874, and was buried in the churchyard of St. Canice's Cathedral, Kilkenny. On 19 December Archbishop Trench described him, when addressing the clergy of the diocese assembled to elect a successor in the see, as a fit representative of the ideal anēr tetragōnos, i.e. the philosopher's four-square man, able to resist attack from whatever quarter made, and his successor, Dr. Robert Gregg, in his primary charge, spoke of O'Brien's ‘unvarying consistency, calm judgement, and chastened self-restraint.’ His personal appearance was dignified and imposing.

He married in 1836 Ellen, second daughter of Edward Pennefather, Lord Chief Justice of Ireland and his wife Susannah Darby, by whom he had eight sons and five daughters.

== Works ==
O'Brien's chief work, ‘An Attempt to explain the Doctrine of Justification by Faith only, in Ten Sermons,’ 1833, was long popular; 2nd ed. 1862, 3rd ed. 1863, 4th ed. 1877, and 5th ed. 1886. His primary and second charges, 1842 and 1845, published in London, and directed in great part against Tractarianism, each went to two or three editions, and the substance of the second was again reproduced in 1847. In 1833 he attacked Edward Irving's views in ‘Two Sermons on the Human Nature of our Blessed Lord,’ which were re-published in 1873 with a ‘Plea from the Bible and the Bible alone for the Doctrine of Baptismal Regeneration.’

Among other works were:

1. ‘The Expediency of restoring at this Time to the Church her Synodical Powers considered’, 1843,
2. ‘The Church in Ireland: our Duty in regard to its Defence’, 1866.
3. ‘The Case of the Established Church in Ireland’, with app., 1867–8; 3rd ed. 1868 and
4. ‘The Disestablishment and Disendowment of the Irish Branch of the United Church considered’, 1869; three editions.

Coat of arms of Thomas O'Brien

Notes
Posthumously confirmed 22 April 1912 by Nevile Rodwell Wilkinson, Ulster King of Arms.
Crest
Issuing from a cloud a naked arm embowed grasping a sword all Proper and charged with a cross as in the arms.
Torse
Of the colours.
Escutcheon
Gules three lions passant guardant in pale per pale Or and Argent on a chief of the second three crosses pattee fitchee Sable.
Motto
Vigueur De Dessus

== Notes ==
- This article incorporates text from a publication now in the public domain: "O'Brien, James Thomas". Dictionary of National Biography. London: Smith, Elder & Co. 1885–1900.
