= Church of St Margaret, Bagendon =

Coordinates: 51.7585°N 1.9849°W

Church of St Margaret
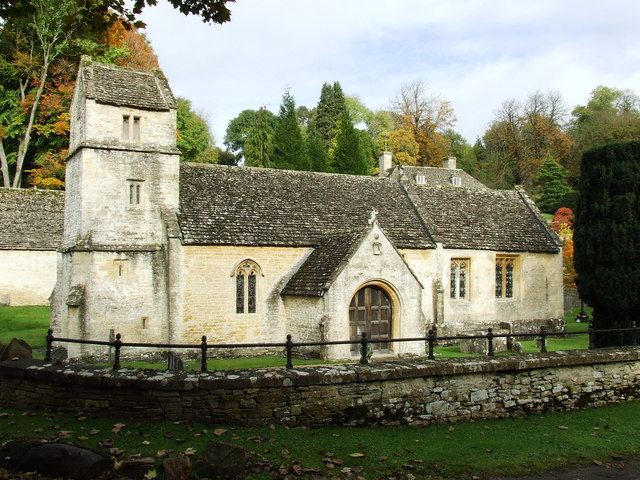

- Denomination: Church of England

Architecture
- Heritage designation: Grade I listed building
- Designated: 26 November 1958

Administration
- Province: Canterbury
- Diocese: Gloucester
- Parish: Bagendon

The Anglican Church of St Margaret at Bagendon in the Cotswold District of Gloucestershire, England was built in the 12th century. It is a grade I listed building.

== History ==
The origins of the church are unclear. The current building was erected in the 12th century but there may have been a Saxon church on the site previously. The chancel was rebuilt in the 1460s and there was some further rebuilding in 1830. A Victorian restoration was carried out by Sidney Gambier-Parry in 1889.

The parish is part of the Churn Valley benefice within the Diocese of Gloucester.

== Architecture ==
The limestone building consists of a nave, north aisle, vestry and chancel with a three-stage west tower supported by diagonal buttresses. The tower contains five bells.

The interior includes an 11th-century font and memorials and tombs from various centuries. There is an aumbrey in the south wall of the sanctuary.

There are fragments of stained glass from the 15th century. The north west window has glass by Charles Eamer Kempe.
