= James McCann (bishop) =

Irish Anglican Bishop (1897–1983)

The Most Reverend James McCann Ph.D., D.D.
- Archbishop of Armagh; Primate of All Ireland
- Church: Church of Ireland
- Diocese: Armagh
- Elected: 19 February 1959
- In office: 1959-1969
- Predecessor: John Gregg
- Successor: George Simms
- Previous post: Bishop of Meath (1945-1959)

Orders
- Ordination: 1920
- Consecration: 24 August 1945 by John Gregg

Personal details
- Born: 31 October 1897 Grantham, Lincolnshire, England
- Died: 19 July 1983 (aged 85) Oxford, Oxfordshire, England
- Buried: Wolvercote Cemetery
- Denomination: Anglican
- Education: Royal Belfast Academical Institution; Queens University Belfast; Trinity College, Dublin

James McCann (31 October 1897 – 19 July 1983) was a 20th-century Anglican Bishop.

Born in Grantham on 31 October 1897 and educated at the Royal Belfast Academical Institution, Queen's University Belfast and Trinity College, Dublin (respondent 1926; B.D. 1935; Ph.D. 1944), he was ordained in 1920. He held curacies at Ballymena, Ballyclare, Cavan and Oldcastle.

He was Rector of Donaghpatrick from 1930 to 1936 and of St Mary's, Drogheda, from 1936 to 1945. He was Bishop of Meath from 1945 to 1959, then Archbishop of Armagh and Primate of All Ireland from 1959 to 1969. He died on 19 July 1983.

== Notes ==
Religious titles
Preceded by William Hardy Holmes	Bishop of Meath; 1945 – 1959	Succeeded by Robert Bonsall Pike
Preceded by John Allen Fitzgerald Gregg	Archbishop of Armagh; 1959 – 1969	Succeeded by George Otto Simms
