= John Gregg (archbishop of Armagh) =

Irish bishop, theologian, and historian

The Right Reverend John Gregg
- Archbishop of Armagh; Primate of All Ireland
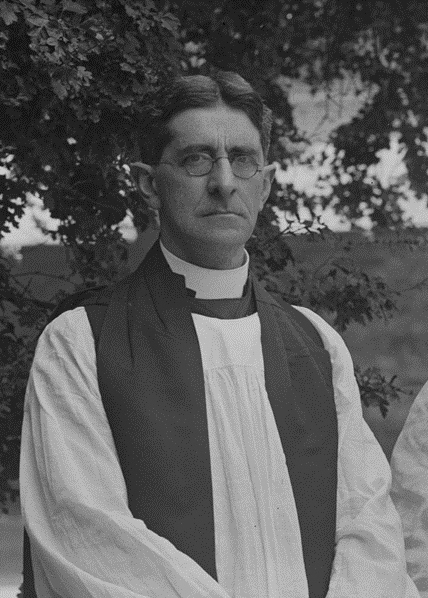
- Church: Church of Ireland
- Diocese: Armagh
- Elected: 15 December 1938
- In office: 1939–1959
- Predecessor: Godfrey Day
- Successor: James McCann
- Previous posts: Bishop of Ossory, Ferns and Leighlin (1915–1920); Archbishop of Dublin (1920–1938)

Orders
- Ordination: 1897
- Consecration: 28 December 1915 by John Bernard

Personal details
- Born: John Allen Fitzgerald Gregg; 4 July 1873 North Cerney, Gloucestershire, England, UK
- Died: 2 May 1961 (aged 87) Dún Laoghaire, Dublin, Ireland
- Denomination: Church of Ireland
- Spouse: Anna Jennings (m. 1902; died 1945) Lesley McEndoo (m. 1947)
- Children: 4, including Barbara Fitzgerald
- Education: Bedford School; Christ's College, Cambridge

John Allen Fitzgerald Gregg CH (4 July 1873–2 May 1961) was a Church of Ireland bishop. From 1915 he was Bishop of Ossory, Ferns and Leighlin and in 1920 he was translated to become Archbishop of Dublin and finally, from 1939 to 1959, Archbishop of Armagh. He was also a theologian and historian.

== Life ==
Gregg was born at North Cerney, Gloucestershire, England, on 4 July 1873, the son of the Reverend John Robert Gregg, vicar of St Nicholas, Deptford. His elder sister, Hilda Gregg, was a popular novelist. The family was Anglo-Irish and had produced many Church of Ireland clergy. Gregg's paternal grandfather, John Gregg, and his uncle Robert Gregg, had both served as Bishop of Cork, Cloyne and Ross, and the latter as Archbishop of Armagh.

Gregg was educated at Bedford School, and at Christ's College, Cambridge, where he was a classical scholar and won the Hulsean Prize Essay competition for 1896 with The Decian Persecution. Gregg graduated BA in 1895; MA 1898; BD 1910; BD (Dublin – ad eundem) 1911; DD (Dublin) 1913; DD (Cantab) – 1929, and was educated for the Anglican ministry at Ridley Hall, Cambridge.

J. A. F. Gregg went on to be a notable church historian. He served as assistant curate of Ballymena under Charles d'Arcy 1896–1899, then as Curate at Cork Cathedral (1899–1906), and as Rector of Blackrock, County Cork (1906–1911), before being appointed in 1911 Archbishop King's Professor of Divinity in Trinity College Dublin. In 1915 he became bishop of Ossory, Ferns and Leighlin, in 1920 archbishop of Dublin. He was accompanied by the Bishop of Cashel Robert Miller and by Protestant businessman Sir William Goulding "to see Michael Collins in May 1922, following the murders of thirteen Protestants in the Bandon valley, to ask whether the Protestant minority should stay on. Collins 'assured them that the government would maintain civil and religious liberty'." He was elected to Armagh in 1938, but refused the position largely on account of his wife's health, and Godfrey Day, bishop of Ossory, was elected in his place. Following Day's death in 1939, Gregg was again elected archbishop of Armagh, a post he held until his retirement in 1959. He was married twice: first in 1902 to Anna Jennings (died 1945) by whom he had two sons and two daughters, and secondly in 1947, to Lesley McEndoo, younger daughter of the then Dean of Armagh. His daughter, Barbara, was a novelist. He was a supporter of the old Unionist order but encouraged his flock to make their peace with the post-1922 political realities in Ireland.

According to R. B. McDowell:

"...the Church of Ireland was led (or some would say dominated) by John Allen Fitzgerald Gregg, archbishop successively of Dublin and Armagh, who might fairly be described as an instinctive conservative with, however, an awareness of contemporary trends... Gregg's bearing suggested a prince of the church or at least a prelate of the establishment... he was a scholar and a man of affairs, his administrative flair being reinforced by dignity, decisiveness, and a sardonic wit... His theological sympathies were high church, though he had been brought up an evangelical and had an Anglo-Irish distaste for ceremonial exuberance.

== Selected publications ==
- The Decian persecution; being the Hulsean prize essay for 1896
- The epistle of St. Clement: bishop of Rome (1899)
- The Wisdom of Solomon (1909)
- The Primitive Faith and Roman Catholic Developments: Six Sermons Delivered in St Fin Barre's Cathedral, Cork, Lent, 1909
- Anglican orders and the prospects of reunion (1930)
- The Ne Temere Decree: A Lecture (1943)

== Honours ==
- 1957: Member of the Order of the Companions of Honour

== Bibliography ==
- Seaver, George, John Allen Fitzgerald Gregg, Archbishop (Faith Press, 1963)
- Simms, George, John Allen Fitzgerald Gregg, 1873–1961: An Appreciation of His Life and Times, Delivered in Christ Church Cathedral, Dublin, on 4th July 1973 Being the Hundredth Anniversary of His Birth (1973, 14 pages)
- "Dublin, Lord Archbishop of" . Thom's Irish Who's Who . Dublin: Alexander Thom and Son Ltd. 1923. p. 69 – via Wikisource.

Anglican Communion titles
Preceded by Charles D'Arcy	Archbishop of Dublin; 1920–1939	Succeeded by Arthur Barton
Preceded by Godfrey Day	Archbishop of Armagh; 1939–1959	Succeeded by James McCann
