= Robert Gregg (bishop) =

19th-century Irish Anglican bishop

The Right Reverend Robert Gregg
- Archbishop of Armagh; Primate of All Ireland
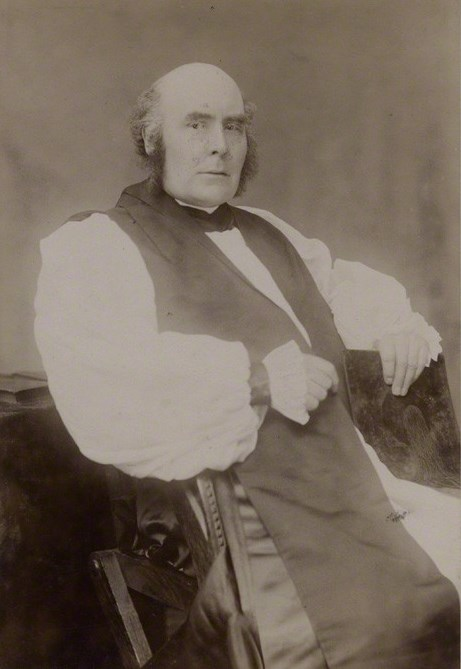
- Church: Church of Ireland
- See: Armagh
- Elected: 14 December 1893
- In office: 1893–1896
- Predecessor: Robert Knox
- Successor: William Alexander
- Previous posts: Bishop of Ossory, Ferns and Leighlin (1874–1878); Bishop of Cork, Cloyne and Ross (1878–1893)

Orders
- Ordination: 1857
- Consecration: 30 March 1875 by Richard Chenevix Trench

Personal details
- Born: 3 May 1834 Kilsallaghan, County Dublin, Ireland
- Died: 10 January 1896 (aged 61) Armagh, County Armagh, Ireland
- Denomination: Anglican
- Parents: John Gregg, Elizabeth Nicola Law
- Spouse: Elinor Bainbridge (m. 1863)
- Children: 2
- Education: Trinity College, Dublin

Robert Samuel Gregg (3 May 1834 – 10 January 1896) was a 19th-century Anglican bishop.

== Life ==
He was born at the rectory, of St. David's Kilsallaghan, County Dublin, of which parish his father, John Gregg, was then rector, on 3 May 1834. His mother was Elizabeth Law. He was educated at Trinity College Dublin, where he graduated as junior moderator in mathematics in 1856, being awarded M.A. in 1860.

In the same year Gregg was ordained for the curacy of Rathcooney, County Cork, and three years later was appointed rector of Christ Church, Belfast, an important cure which brought him in touch with the working-class population of the north of Ireland. In 1862 he returned to the Diocese of Cork as rector of Frankfield and chaplain to his father, then Bishop of Cork. Frankfield was perhaps the place with which he was to have the closest connection: his wife Elinor was a native of Frankfield, and they are both buried there. In 1865 he became rector of St Peter's Church, Carrigrohane and precentor of Saint Fin Barre's Cathedral, Cork. Here he quickly acquired a high reputation for administrative ability, as well as for the qualities of sound judgment, moderation, and good sense by which he was subsequently distinguished in the episcopal office. In the controversies which followed, the disestablishment of the Irish church, particularly in regard to the revision of the prayer book, Gregg took the conservative side, but his influence was uniformly exerted in a conciliatory spirit. Gregg's principal service to his church at this time lay in devising for his own diocese of Cork the singularly successful financial plan which became the foundation of the financial system of the disendowed Church of Ireland, and on this and other occasions he showed a remarkable talent for finance. In 1873 he was presented by the University of Dublin with the degrees of B.D. and D.D., in recognition of his services to the Church of Ireland.

In 1874, Gregg was appointed Dean of Cork, and in the following year was selected by the Irish bishops to succeed James Thomas O'Brien in the diocese of Bishop of Ossory. Gregg, at forty-one years of age, thus became a member of the episcopal bench while his father was still Bishop of Cork, Cloyne and Ross. On his father's death on 26 May 1878, the synods of Cork, Cloyne and Ross at once selected Gregg to succeed him. As Bishop of Cork, Gregg's most noticeable work lay in the completion of the cathedral of St. Finn Barre, which had been rebuilt during his father's episcopate at a cost of over £100,000. On the death in 1893 of Primate Robert Bent Knox, Gregg was selected to succeed him as Archbishop of Armagh and Primate of all Ireland.

He married Elinor Bainbridge of Frankfield in 1863, and had two children, John and Amy. Amy in 1898 married, as his second wife, Robert Walsh the Archdeacon of Dublin.

He died suddenly at the Palace, Armagh, on 10 January 1896, after about two years' of the primacy, and was buried at Frankfield beside his wife Elinor.

His nephew John Gregg became Archbishop of Armagh.

== Notes ==
Attribution

This article incorporates text from a publication now in the public domain: Falkiner, Cæsar Litton (1901). "Gregg, Robert Samuel". In Lee, Sidney (ed.). Dictionary of National Biography (1st supplement). London: Smith, Elder & Co.

Religious titles
Preceded by James Thomas O'Brien	Bishop of Ossory, Ferns and Leighlin; 1874 – 1878	Succeeded by William Pakenham Walsh
Preceded by John Gregg	Bishop of Cork, Cloyne and Ross; 1878– 1893	Succeeded by William Edward Meade
Preceded by Robert Bent Knox	Archbishop of Armagh; 1893 – 1896	Succeeded by William Alexander
