= Barbara Fitzgerald =

Irish novelist

- Born: Barbara Gregg; 16 December 1911; Cork, Ireland
- Died: 21 May 1982 (aged 70); Dublin
- Spouse: Michael Fitzgerald Somerville
- Parent: John Allen Fitzgerald Gregg

Barbara Fitzgerald (16 December 1911 – 21 May 1982) was an Irish novelist.

== Life ==
Barbara Fitzgerald was born Barbara Gregg in Cork on 16 December 1911. Her parents were John Allen Fitzgerald Gregg and Anna Gregg (née Jennings). Fitzgerald spent her youth in Kilkenny and Dublin, attending school in England. She entered Trinity College Dublin as a foundation scholar in 1931. In 1933 she graduated with honours in Italian and French. She married Michael Fitzgerald Somerville on 21 August 1935 at St Bartholomew's Church, Dublin. As a society wedding, people lined the streets of Ballsbridge to watch the wedding party pass. Fitzgerald's father performed the wedding ceremony, with the couple then honeymooning in Scotland. Her husband was an oil executive, and the couple lived in west Africa until the beginning of World War II when they returned to England. Her father-in-law was Henry Boyle Townshend Somerville, who was murdered on 14 March 1936 by the IRA.

Her first novel, We are besieged, was published in 1946 and describes the destruction of an Irish big house in 1920, Butler's Hill. Some of the scenes and settings are similar to those used by Elizabeth Bowen. Her second novel, Footprints upon water, was first published in 1955 and was reissued after her death in 1983. We are besieged was republished again in 2011, and Footprints upon water in 2012 leading to a rediscovery of her work.

Fitzgerald retired to Ireland in 1968 with her husband. She suffered with ill health for a number of years, succumbing to early dementia. She died in Dublin on 21 May 1982. She had a son, Julian and a daughter, Christina.
