= 1886 Belfast riots =

1886 Civil unrest incident in Belfast, Ireland

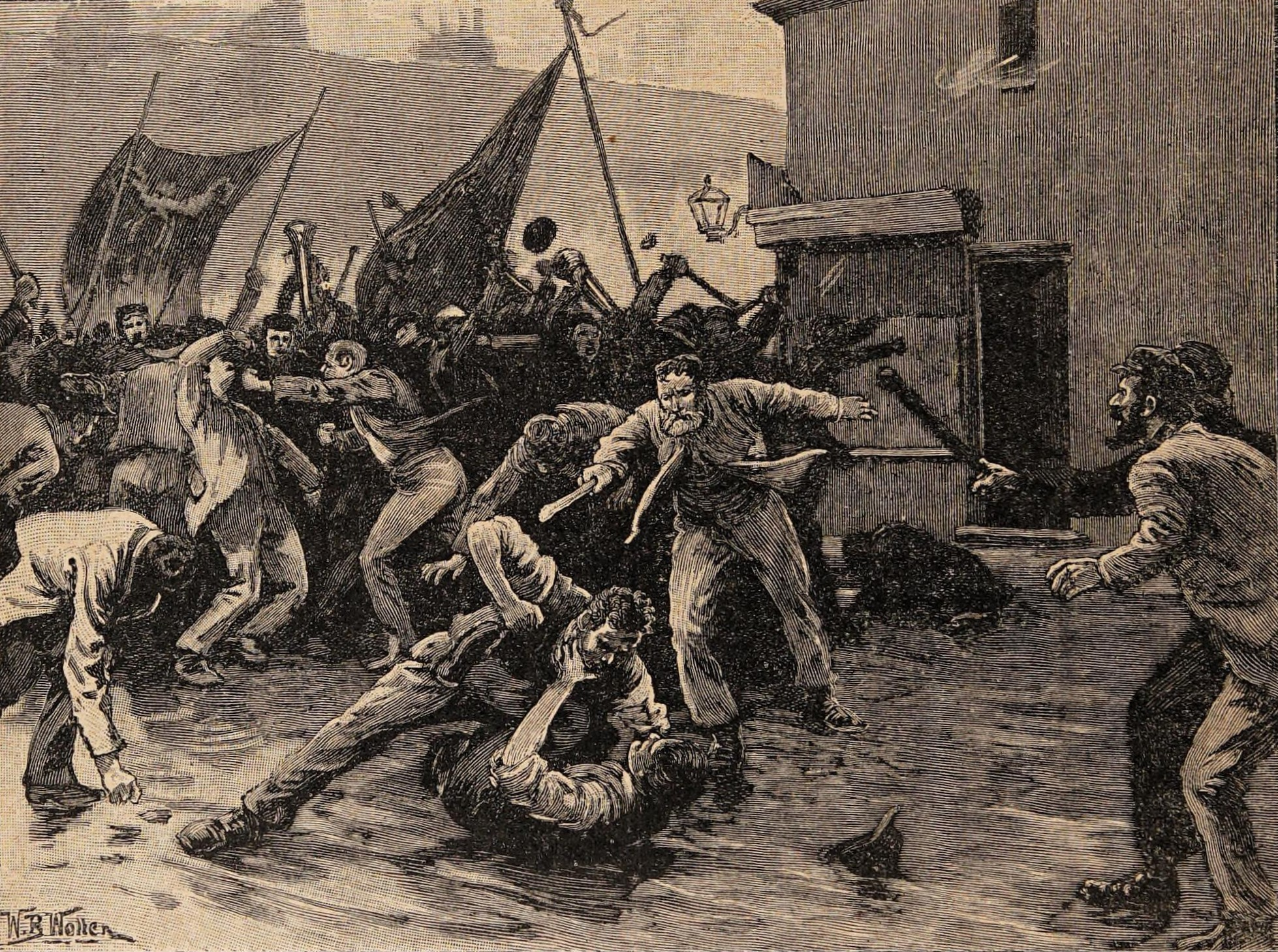
- Date: June–September 1886
- Location: Belfast, Ireland
- Methods: Rioting, arson, assault, gun battles

Casualties and losses
- 31 deaths (official estimate); 371 injuries 442 arrests

The 1886 Belfast riots were a series of intense riots that occurred in Belfast, Ireland, during the summer and autumn of 1886.

== Background ==
Irish Nationalists had seized the vast majority of Irish seats in the 1885 election, and would maintain this dominance in the 1886 election onwards.

In the late 19th century, Catholics began to migrate in large numbers to the prosperous city of Belfast in search of work. By the time of the riots, Catholics made up over one-third of the population of the city. This migration brought with it sectarian tensions as Catholics and Protestants competed for jobs. As the minority, Catholics found themselves discriminated against in this area and were kept at the lower end of the labour market.

At this time there was a real possibility that the British government would establish a devolved Irish parliament (see Irish Home Rule Movement). Belfast Catholics believed that a devolved Irish government would be sympathetic to their situation and end the discrimination. Belfast Protestants believed this too, and feared the end of their privileged position.

In April 1886, Prime Minister William Gladstone introduced a Home Rule Bill. The Bill was defeated in the House of Commons on 8 June. The future Leader of the Conservative Party (UK), Lord Randolph Churchill visited Belfast after the defeat of the Bill where he made speeches against the possibility of future Home Rule Bills. He was said to have "...excited sectarian passions which expressed themselves in horrible assaults on the Nationalist minority."

== Riots ==
The introduction of the Bill led to renewed sectarian tensions in Belfast. On 3 June, a Catholic navvy sneered to a Protestant co-worker that under an Irish government Protestants would never get hired, even in Belfast. This represented the very worst fears of Protestants towards Home Rule and the story quickly spread throughout Belfast. This led to clashes between Protestant and Catholic shipyard labourers.

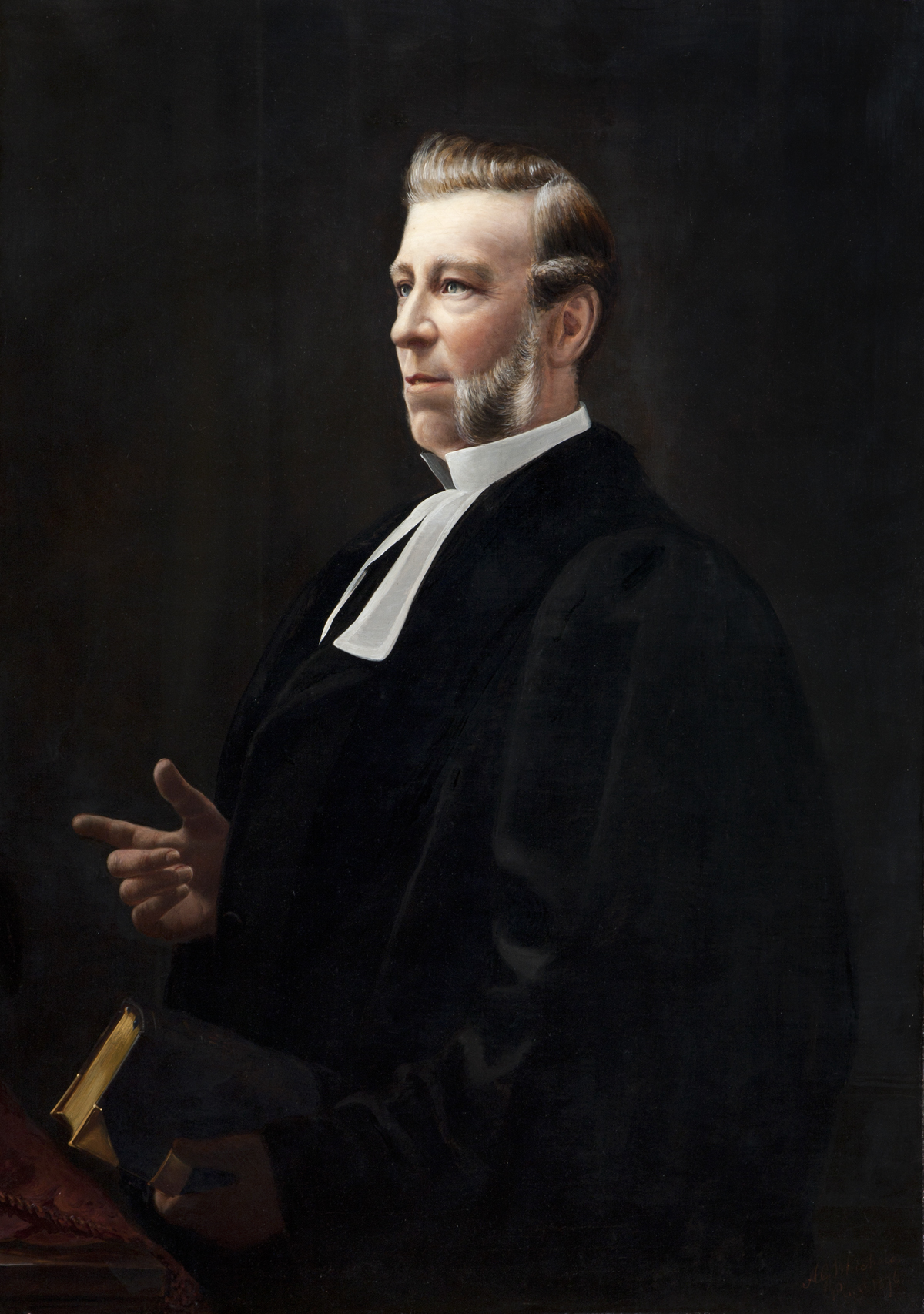
Preachers such as Hugh Hanna played a prominent role in encouraging rioters.

The riots intensified on 8 June, the day that the Home Rule Bill was defeated in parliament. Celebrations were held throughout the city to celebrate the defeat. Some of the revellers attacked Catholic homes and businesses. The police found themselves unable to cope with the situation. Reinforcements were sent in from other parts of Ireland. Most of the reinforcements were Catholic. A rumour that the reinforcements were sent by Gladstone to punish Belfast Protestants for opposing Home Rule spread throughout the city. It was encouraged by popular preachers such as Hugh Hanna and his Church of Ireland counterpart, the city's Orange Order Grand Master, Rev. Richard Rutledge Kane. In the midst of the disorder, Kane declared that unless the police were disarmed, 200,000 armed Orangemen would relieve them of their weapons. The rioters thus began to attack the police, and later soldiers. Running battles between security forces and rioters lasted until 14 June.

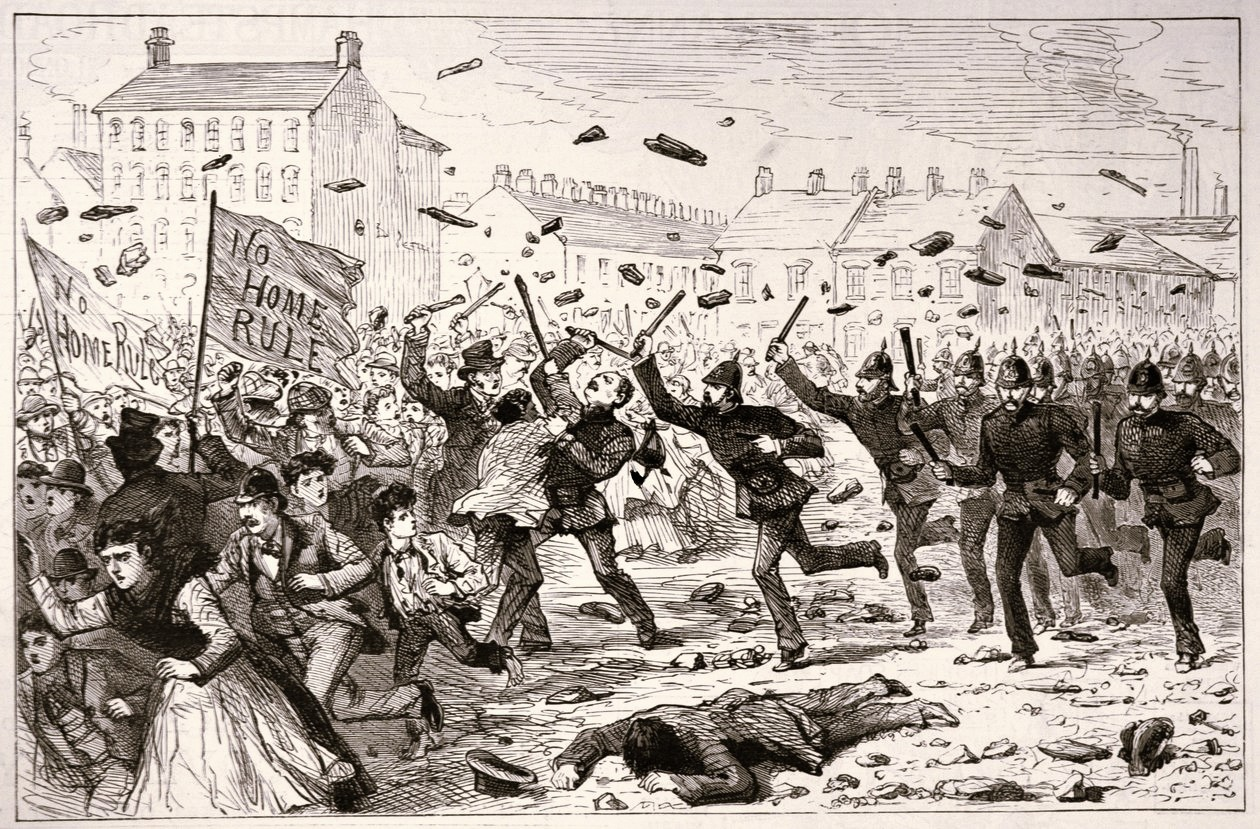
The Royal Irish Constabulary charging anti-Home Rule crowds in Belfast during the riots of 1886

On 22 June the reinforcements were sent home by the city government, although some were kept as trouble was expected on 12 July, the date of annual Protestant celebrations. Trouble did indeed erupt on the 12th and, contrary to the expectations of the government, the police found themselves overwhelmed by the Protestant attackers. Reinforcements had to be sent into Belfast again, and the threat of over 2,000 police officers and soldiers descending on the city caused the rioters to quit by 14 July.

On the last Saturday of July, Hanna held his annual outing for the Protestant children of Belfast. This outing usually involved a trip out to the countryside, with marching and drumming along the way. Hanna agreed to comply with the city's request that he forgo the drumming and marching due to the tense situation. As the outing made its way through Belfast, disappointed local Protestants joined in to march with their own drums and anti-Catholic banners. Marchers deliberately provoked the Catholics by marching into Catholic areas. Taunting quickly gave way to heavy street fighting between Catholics, Protestants and police. Bloody clashes on a par with the riots in June lasted for a few days, but low-intensity rioting continued until September.

Officially thirty-one people were killed in the riots, although George Foy, who made surgical reports on the riots, reckoned that the real death toll might have been as high as fifty. Hundreds were injured. Over four hundred arrests were made. An estimated £90,000 worth of property damage was incurred, and local economic activity was significantly compromised.

== Bibliography ==
- Bardon, Jonathon, (2001), A History of Ulster, Belfast: The Blackstaff Press.
- Boyd, Andrew, (1987), Holy War in Belfast, Belfast: Pretani Press.
- Budge, Ian and O'Leary, Cornelius, (1973), Belfast: Approach to Crisis. A Study of Belfast Politics, 1613–1970, London: MacMillan Press.
- Elliott, Marianne, (2000), The Catholics of Ulster: A History, London: Penguin.
