= Bagendon =

Village in Gloucestershire, England

Coordinates: 51.75°N 01.98°W

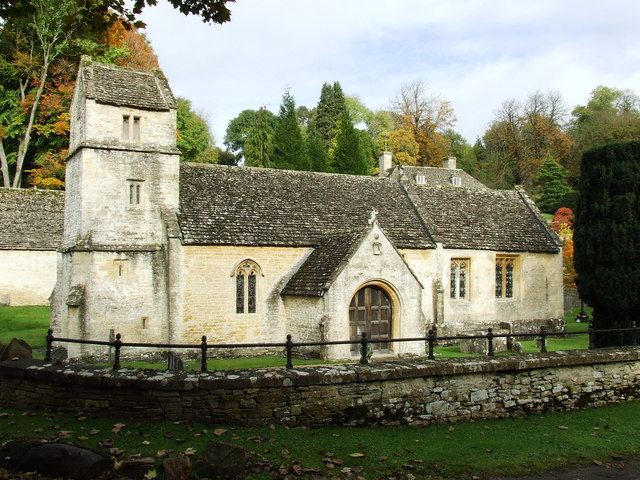
- Church of St Margaret

- Location within Gloucestershire
- Population: 239
- OS grid reference: SP0106
- Shire county: Gloucestershire
- Region: South West
- Country: England
- Sovereign state: United Kingdom
- Post town: Cirencester
- Postcode district: GL7
- Police: Gloucestershire
- Fire: Gloucestershire
- Ambulance: South Western
- UK Parliament: North Cotswolds

Bagendon is a village and civil parish in the Cotswold district of Gloucestershire, England, about four miles (6 km) north of Cirencester. According to the 2001 census it had a population of 265, decreasing to 239 at the 2011 census. The hamlet of Perrott's Brook is adjacent to Bagendon's southeast.

== Etymology ==
Also historically called Bagginton and Badgington until the late 19th-century, the name derives from the early medieval description "valley of Baecga's folk".

== History ==
Bagendon was first inhabited around the early 1st Century CE, if not earlier, by the local Dobunni tribe who created the Bagendon Hillfort, a large and impressive settlement that some scholars have claimed was their capital or home to their elites.

== St Margaret's Church ==
The Church of England parish church, St Margaret's, a Grade I listed building dedicated probably either to St Margaret of Antioch or to St Margaret of Scotland, is “an attractive and interesting little church, often subjected to flooding". The church building is partly Norman, but the chancel, south door and porch, the windows in the nave, and the diagonal buttresses of the tower date to between about 1460 and 1470.

== People ==
The novelist Hilda Gregg was born here in 1868.
