= Nendrum Monastery =

Christian monastery in Northern Ireland

- Mainistir Naondroma
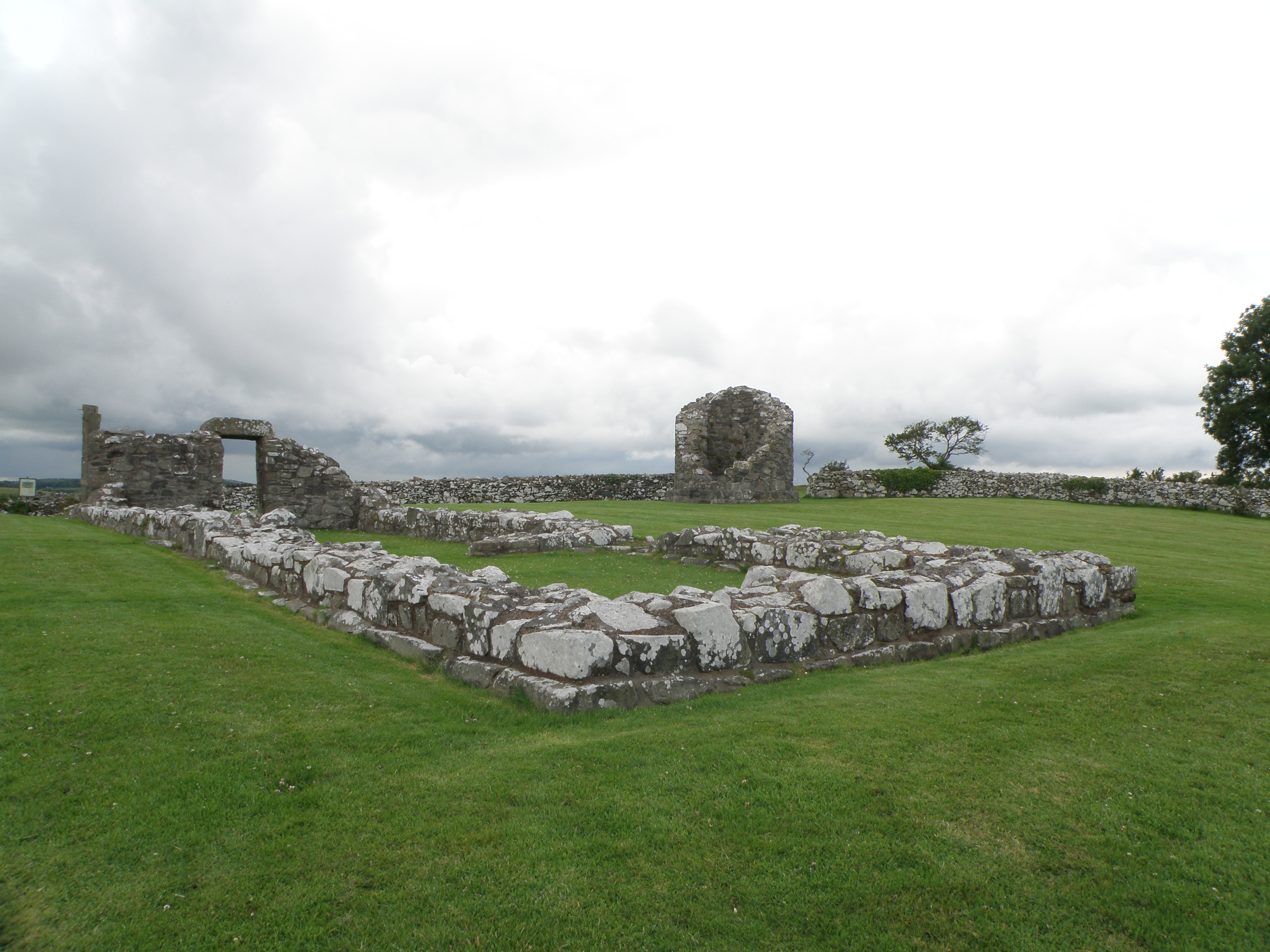

- Location within County Down Location within Northern Ireland Location within island of Ireland

Monastery information
- Other names: Oendruim; Aonagh-urmuman; Oinach-urmuman; Nenddrum; Noindrum; Noendoma; Mahee Island
- Order: Celtic monasticism Benedictine (from 1178)
- Established: early 5th century?
- Disestablished: between 974 and 1178
- Diocese: Down and Connor (Catholic); Down and Dromore (Church of Ireland)

People
- Founder: Mochaoi:P

Architecture
- Status: Inactive

Site
- Location: Mahee Island, Strangford Lough, County Down
- Coordinates: 54.498°N 5.648°W
- Visible remains: round tower, ruined church, cashel, tide mill
- Public access: Yes

Nendrum Monastery (Irish: Naondroim) was a Christian monastery on Mahee Island in Strangford Lough, County Down, Northern Ireland. Medieval records say it was founded in the 5th century, but this is uncertain. The monastery came to an end at some time between 974 and 1178, but its church served a parish until the site was abandoned in the 15th century. Some remains of the monastery can still be seen.

== History ==
The island monastery of Nendrum was traditionally founded in the 5th century by Mochaoi, after whom Mahee Island is named, although a later date for the foundation has been suggested. Mo Chaoi, like the name of many Irish saints, is a pet name. His proper name was Caolán (Mochaoi) and according to tradition he was appointed by St. Patrick. Dendrochronology has dated a tide mill on the island to the year 619, making this the oldest excavated tide mill anywhere in the world. The monastic site included orchards, gardens, pastures, arable fields, and a guest-house.

In his Ecclesiastical Antiquities of Down, Connor, and Dromore, William Reeves notes that several annals record the death of St Mochaoi of Nendrum at a variety of dates between 490 and 497. He considers that Nendrum was early chosen as the seat of a bishop, quoting the Annals of Tigernach and the Annals of Ulster, both of which describe Cronan (died c. 640) as "bishop of Nendrum".

There are references to Nendrum in various sources, such as the Annals of the Four Masters, between the 7th century and the year 974, when the Four Masters record that "Sedna Ua Demain, Abbot of Nendrum, was consumed in his own house". This is read as meaning that Sedna was burnt, perhaps during a Viking raid, and is the last heard of Nendrum in the annals. Reeves says –

Probably it was pillaged and demolished soon after by the Danes, whose ships were continually floating in Strangford Lough. When the name next occurs, it is as belonging to property of the see of Down, with which John de Courcy, in 1178, takes the liberty of making it over to the monks of an English abbey. It would seem, however, that long ere this it held some tributary relation to the see of Down...

The English monks were Benedictines and founded a small cell on Mahee Island. However, in 1306 Nendrum was recorded as a parish church, and during the 15th century it was abandoned for a new site at the village of Tullynakill. The location of Nendrum was then lost until it was rediscovered in 1844 by William Reeves, who visited the island searching for the church recorded in 1306 and recognized the remains of a round tower.

== Archaeology ==
Since being excavated by H. C. Lawlor between 1922 and 1924, with the resulting finds now kept in the Ulster Museum, the site has been much restored. The rectangular building yielded about 30 slate tablets bearing Celtic designs. These 'trial-pieces' are now in the Ulster Museum along with a bell and a stone with an inscription in runes also from the site. Parts of the site were excavated later, by A. C. Thomas in 1954, by D. Waterman in the 1960s and by N. Brannon in 1979 and 1982. Lawlor's work was the first extensive excavation of such a large ecclesiastical site, and his technique has been criticized by modern standards, but one of the reasons for Nendrum's importance to archaeologists is that it is still the only major site of its kind which has been the subject of published excavation reports.

== Features ==
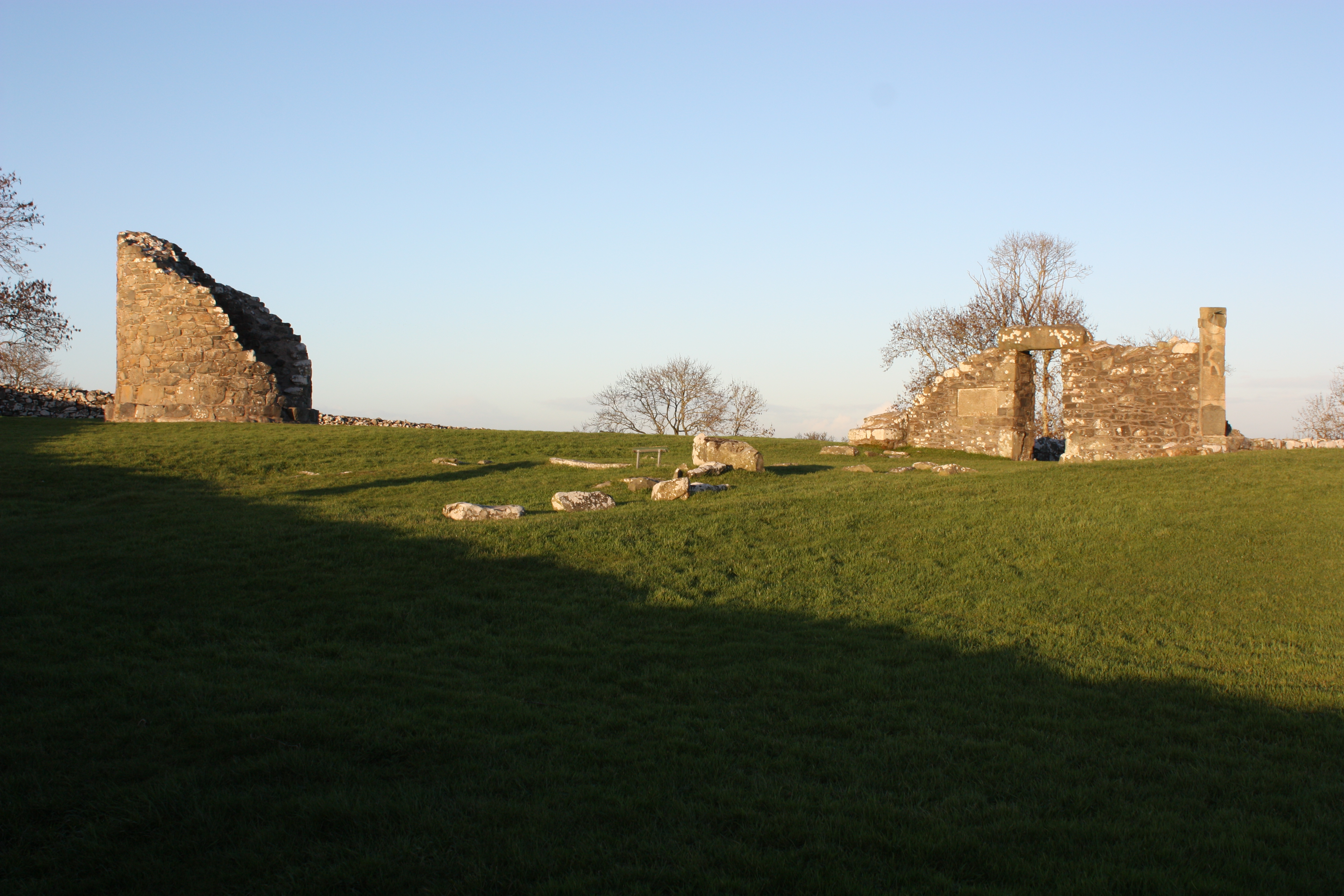
Nendrum Monastery, January 2011 (21)

The principal monastic remains which can now be seen are three concentric cashels (enclosures) of dry stone walling, but these were substantially rebuilt by Lawlor in the 1920s. The central cashel has the round tower remains, a ruined church with a sun-dial, and a graveyard. The second cashel contains what is called a 'monastic school' or workshop and other burials.

The canonical sundial now seen at one corner of the ruined church was reconstructed from fragments found during the excavation of the site in 1924 and has been dated to about the year 900. One of only a few early medieval sun-dials known to exist, it takes the form of a vertical stone pillar, 190 cm high, 40 cm wide and 15 cm thick, with the dial and gnomon on one face at the top. However, because of the nature of the reconstruction, the original height of the pillar is conjectural.

=== Mill ===
The Nendrum Monastery mill (54.500°N 5.647°W) was a tide mill on the island. It is the earliest excavated tide mill, dating from 787 AD. Its millstones are 830mm in diameter and the horizontal wheel is estimated to have produced 7/8 horsepower (0.65 kW) at its peak. Remains of an earlier mill dated at 619 AD were also found.

== Ongoing spirituality ==
Nendrum lies within the United Parish of Killinchy, Kilmood and Tullynakill. The current Rector of the parish, Rev. Dr. Stanley Gamble has spiritual authority and responsibility for the ancient site. On the Sunday after the summer solstice each year, the parish has an open-air service within the walls of the old church. On Sunday 25 June 2017, the first Christening service took place at the site since the monastery was dissolved. An annual service is also held at the monastery by St. Mary's Parish, Comber, on Palm Sunday each year.

== Tourism ==
Mahee Island is within Strangford Lough, a body of water which has been designated as an Area of Outstanding Natural Beauty. The island is approached by narrow roads and causeways leading from the A22 road south of Comber, which is the road to Downpatrick.

A cottage was built on the island in the early 20th century and is now used as a visitor centre. The island is open daily from 10 am to 6 pm between Easter and 30 September, and from 12 pm to 4 pm on Sundays from October to Easter.

== Gallery ==
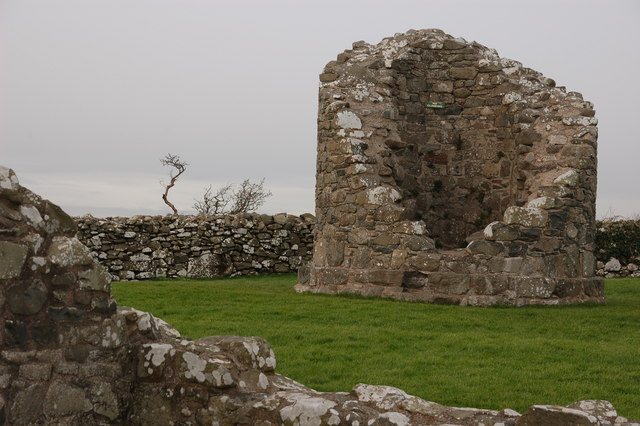
Nendrum, stump of round tower, 2007

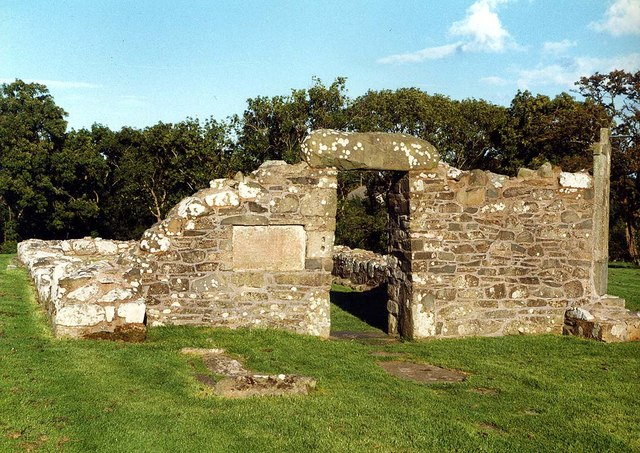
Nendrum, monastery ruins, 1997

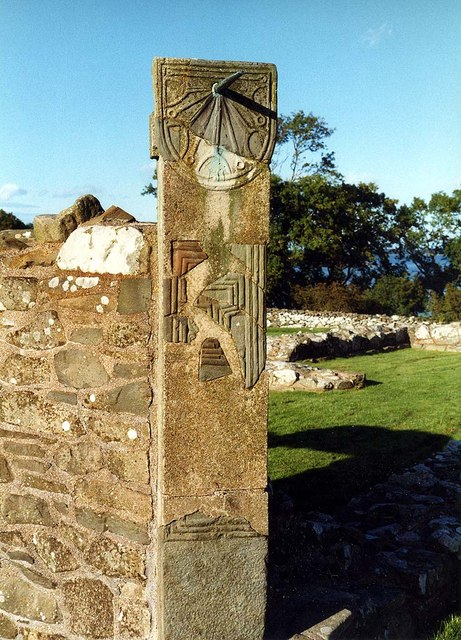
Nendrum, sundial, 1997

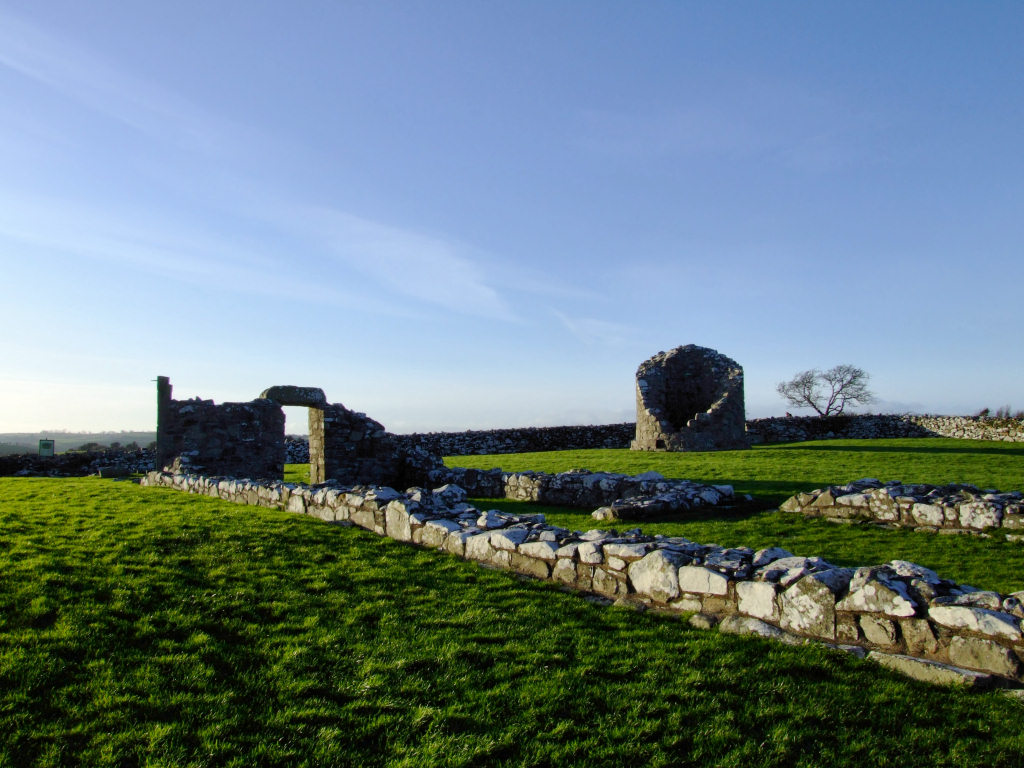
Nendrum Abbey Ruins 2007

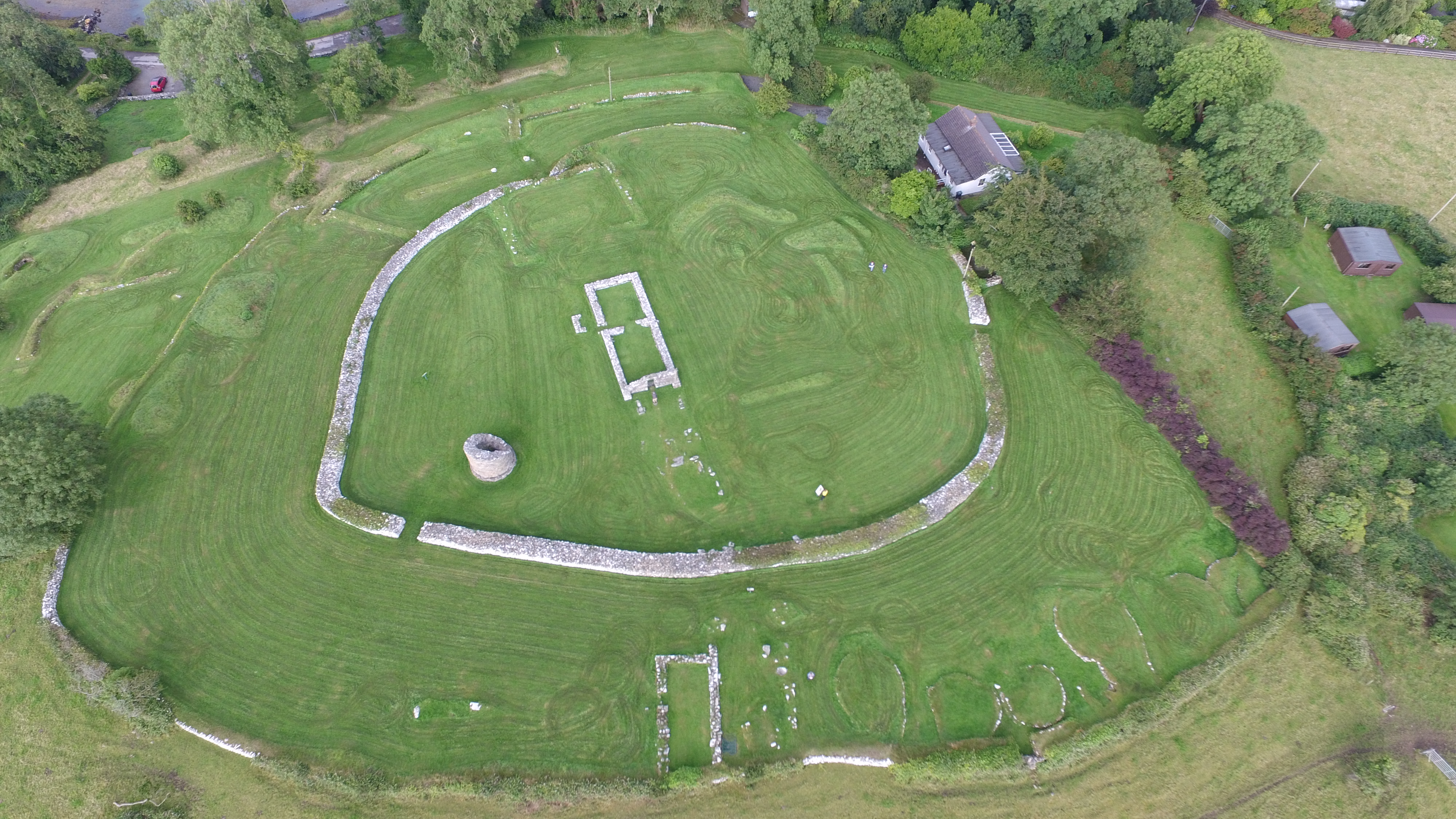
Aerial view of Nendrum Monastery, 2015

== Bibliography ==
- Reeves, William, 'A description of Nendrum, commonly called Mahee Island, embracing its present condition and past history', in Ulster Journal of Archaeology (second series) 8, 13–22, 58–68 (1845, reprinted 1902)
- Knox, A., A history of the county of Down: from the most remote period to the present day: including an account of its early colonization, ecclesiastical, civil, and military polity, geography, topography, antiquities and natural history (Dublin: Hodges, Foster & Co., 1875)
- Lawlor, H. C., The monastery of Saint Mochaoi of Nendrum (Belfast Natural History and Philosophical Society, 1925)
- Fitzsimons, E. M., Mochae of Nendrum and his cult (unpublished M.Phil. thesis, Queen's University of Belfast, 2000)
- Macdonald, P., Excavations at Mahee Castle, Co. Down CAF Data Structure Report No. 11 (Centre for Archaeological Fieldwork, Queen's University Belfast, 2003)
- Matthews, G. Nendrum rediscovered (unpublished undergraduate thesis, Queen's University of Belfast, 1995)
- McErlean, T., and Crothers, N., 'The Early Medieval tide mills at Nendrum, an interim statement', in McErlean, T., McConkey, R., and Forsythe, W., Strangford Lough. An archaeological survey of the maritime cultural landscape (Northern Ireland Archaeol. Mono. No. 6) (Blackstaff Press Limited and Environment and Heritage Service, Belfast, 2002)
- Baoill, R., and McQuaid, Y., Mahee Castle (unpublished excavation summary report, Belfast, 2002)

== See also ==
- Nendrum Monastery mill
- Abbeys and priories in Northern Ireland - County Down
