= Robert Walsh (priest) =

Irish priest

Robert Walsh was an Irish Anglican priest who was the Archdeacon of Dublin from 1909 until his death on 24 February 1917.

Walsh was the eldest son of John Edward Walsh, Master of the Rolls in Ireland and formerly Member of Parliament for Dublin University by his wife Blair Belinda MacNeill, daughter of Captain Gordon MacNeill. He was educated at Trinity College, Dublin and ordained in 1866. After curacies in Tamlaght Finlagan and Dublin he held incumbencies in Malahide and Donnybrook. He was also a prebendary of Christ Church Cathedral, Dublin; chaplain to the Lord Lieutenant of Ireland; and an examining chaplain to the Archbishop of Dublin.

He married firstly in 1873 Elizabeth Sophia Carson, daughter of the Reverend Joseph Carson, Vice-Provost of Trinity College, Dublin, by whom he had three sons and two daughters. She died in 1893. He married secondly in 1898 Amy Gregg, only daughter of Robert Gregg, Archbishop of Armagh, and his wife Elinor Bainbridge. Henry Deane Walsh, perhaps the foremost Australian engineer of his time, was his younger brother.
