= Bagendon hillfort =

Iron-Age hillfort in Bagendon, Gloucestershire

Coordinates: 51°45′23″N 1°58′32″W

Bagendon hillfort (also known as Bagendon Settlement) is an Iron-age and Roman era hillfort In Gloucestershire, 5 km away from Cirencester. The hillfort is a univallate type hillfort, having a singular rampart. The hillfort is made up of a large dyke system and is between 80 and 200 hectares. It is described as a ‘territorial Oppidum’.

== History ==
Bagendon hillfort was constructed between the 1st Century BCE and the 1st Century CE (possibly around 20 CE). It was likely built by the local Dobunni, the Celtic tribe that inhabited the region. Some scholars consider the hillfort to have been the capital of the Dobunni, or at least a major Dobunni settlement, whilst others believe it is too semi-urban to be a capital and instead was a royal park or centre for the elites. The site consisted of farmsteads, field systems, and urban and semi-urban areas scattered around. Limited investigations of the site have shown evidence of an industrial complex with coin-minting, Romano-British villas were also created at the site in the late-1st Century CE showing rapid adoption of Roman customs. Fragments of imported Gallo-Belgic and Gaulish Samian pottery have been found, showing high-status occupation at the site. By 60 CE, most residents of the Bagendon hillfort had moved to Cirencester instead.

In 2015, archaeologists from Durham University discovered a Roman villa on the site, the villa contained underfloor heating and painted walls. It had been built atop an Iron Age pit and was likely constructed after most of the populace of Bagendon hillfort had moved to nearby Cirencester. The villa was one of many on the hillfort and they may have served as country estates for the rich of Cirencester.
