= Hilda Gregg =

English novelist and short story writer

Hilda Caroline Gregg (20 June 1868 – 22 June 1933) was an English author who wrote novels and short stories under the name Sydney C. Grier. She had her fiction printed in The Bristol Times in 1886, then William Blackwood and Sons published her first novel in 1895. She then published a novel every year until 1925, mostly heroic tales about the adventures of English people in places such as Afghanistan, Baghdad, and India.

== Early life ==
Hilda Caroline Gregg was born on 20 June 1868 in Bagendon near Cirencester in Gloucestershire. Her parents were Sarah Caroline Frances French and John Robert G. Gregg. She was brought up in a strictly religious household, with her father following the Irish Protestant tradition and later becoming vicar of Deptford. She was the eldest daughter, and, from her siblings, John became Archbishop of Armagh, and Katherine was one of the first women to qualify as a doctor in England. Gregg was privately educated before gaining a master's from the University of London.

== Career ==
Gregg first had her fiction published by The Bristol Times in 1886. She then won a short-story competition organised by Cassell's Family Magazine and contributed work to periodicals such as Argosy, The Girl's Own Paper and The Lady's Realm. She began a working relationship with her publisher William Blackwood and Sons in 1894, when she sent an unsolicited copy of her first novel to Edinburgh. Blackwood published the book as In Furthest Ind: The Narrative of Mr. Edward Carlyon of the Honourable East India Company's Service the following year, under the pseudonym of Sydney C. (for Carolyn) Grier. The book was set in Surat, a city in Gujarat, India, and took the form of Carlyon's fictionalised memoir from the second half of the seventeenth century, when the East India Company was still establishing itself. Her second novel, An Uncrowned King: A Romance of High Politics, came out in 1896.

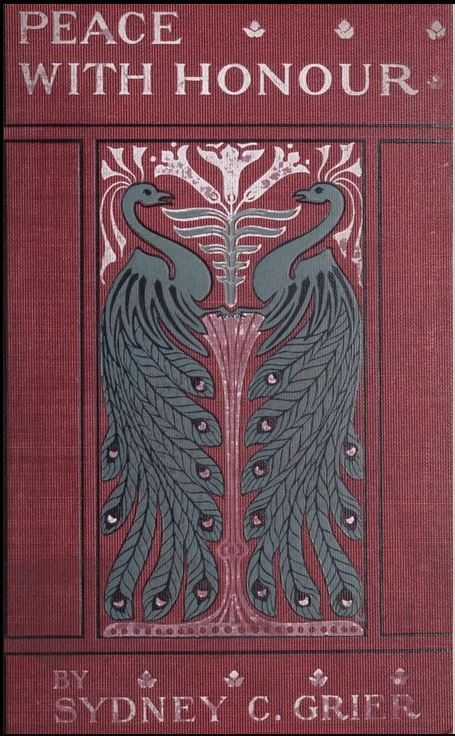
Cover of Peace with Honour, a novel about a new woman doctor

Gregg would publish a novel every year until 1925, all with Blackwood. She wrote 33 in total. Rather than engage with contemporary issues such as the New Woman, Gregg preferred to focus on historical adventure stories of English people succeeding in exotic places. Her other novels include The Uncrowned Prince (1896), His Excellency's English Governess (1896, set in Baghdad), The Wardens of the Marches (1901, Afghanistan) and One Crowded Hour (1912, Sicily).

The 1897 novel Peace with Honour is unusual in that its hero, Georgia Keeling, is a doctor. She is sent out to Ethiopia to correct the Ethiopian queen’s cataracts, but the death of another physician places the hero at the centre of a story involving poisonings. The book was notable as it involved not only a woman doctor but a single woman abroad. Gregg discussed this issue, immodestly, in "The Medical Woman in Fiction" in Blackwood's Magazine in 1898. Another piece published in the magazine was the 1897 article "The Indian Mutiny in Fiction". Also her novel An Uncrowned King was serialized in Blackwood's from December 1895 until September 1896.

Gregg was involved in supporting the reputation of de facto Governor-General of India Warren Hastings, who had died in 1818. As Sydney C. Grier she published "A Friend of Warren Hastings" in 1904 and "A God-daughter of Warren Hastings" in 1905, and introduced and annotated "The Letters of Warren Hastings to His Wife".

== Death and legacy ==
Gregg died at home in Eastbourne on 22 June 1933. She left £4,200 (equivalent to £376,628 in 2023) in her will.
