= Charles D'Arcy =

Irish bishop (1859–1938)

The Right Reverend Charles D'Arcy
- Archbishop of Armagh; Primate of All Ireland
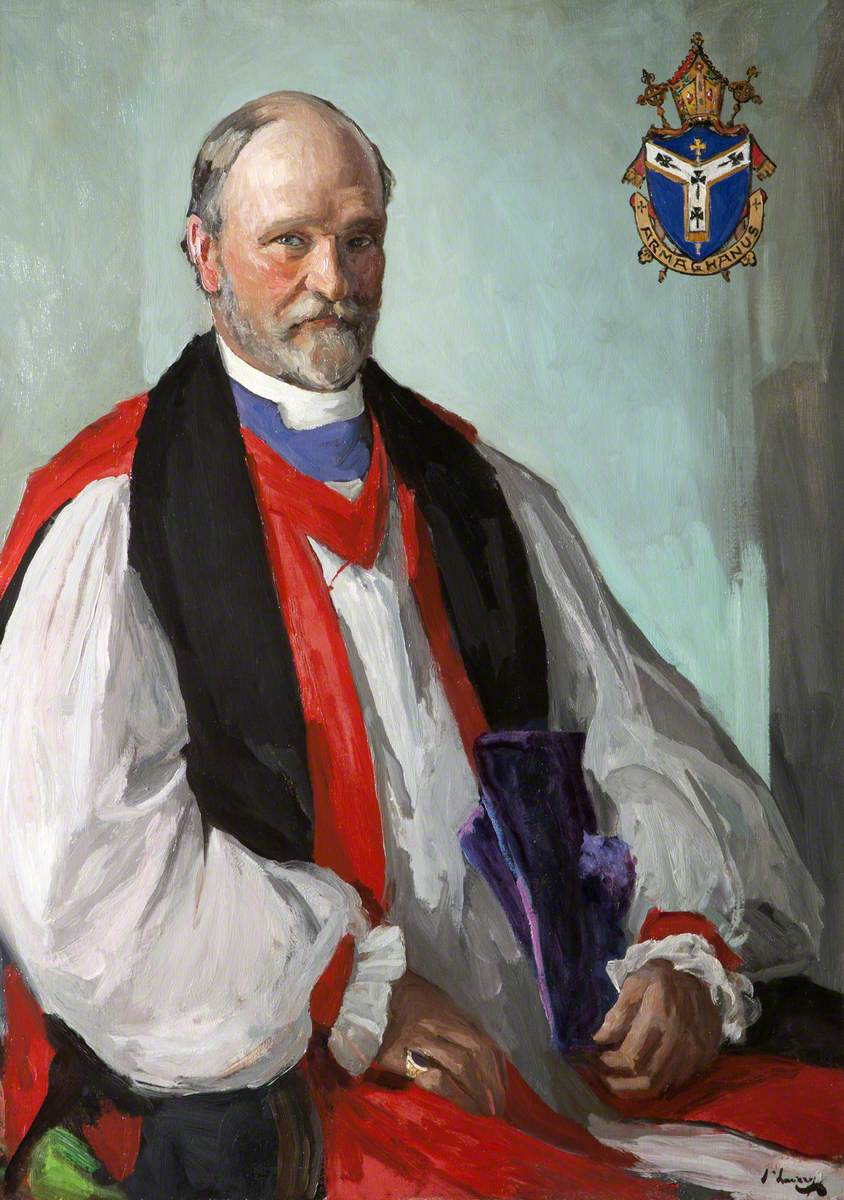
- 1928 portrait by Sir John Lavery
- Church: Church of Ireland
- Diocese: Armagh
- Elected: 17 June 1920
- In office: 1920–1938
- Predecessor: John Crozier
- Successor: Godfrey Day
- Previous posts: Bishop of Clogher; Bishop of Ossory, Ferns and Leighlin; Bishop of Down, Connor and Dromore; Archbishop of Dublin

Orders
- Ordination: 1884
- Consecration: 24 February 1903 by William Alexander

Personal details
- Born: 2 January 1859 Dublin, Ireland
- Died: 1 February 1938 (aged 79) Armagh, County Armagh, Northern Ireland
- Buried: St Patrick's Cathedral, Armagh
- Denomination: Anglican
- Parents: John Charles D'Arcy; Henrietta Anna Brierly
- Spouse: Harriet le Byrtt
- Education: The High School, Dublin; Trinity College, Dublin

Charles Frederick D'Arcy (2 January 1859 – 1 February 1938) was a Church of Ireland bishop. He was the Bishop of Clogher from 1903 to 1907 when he was translated to become Bishop of Ossory, Ferns and Leighlin before then becoming the Bishop of Down, Connor and Dromore. He was then briefly the Archbishop of Dublin and finally, from 1920 until his death, Archbishop of Armagh. He was also a theologian, author and botanist.

== Early life ==
Born in Dublin in 1859, D'Arcy was the son of John Charles D'Arcy of Mount Tallant, County Dublin, and of Henrietta Anna, a daughter of Thomas Brierly of Rehoboth House, Dublin. He was a grandson of John D'Arcy of Hydepark, County Westmeath, and a descendant of The 1st Baron Darcy de Knayth, one of the knights who had fought at the Battle of Crecy (1346).

Charles D'Arcy was educated at The High School, Dublin, and Trinity College, Dublin, where he was elected a Scholar in mathematics and won a gold medal in Moral philosophy. He graduated BA in 1882, with a first-class Divinity Testimonium, and MA in 1892. He was later awarded the degrees of Bachelor of Divinity, 1898, and Doctor of Divinity, 1900.

== Career ==
D'Arcy was ordained and became curate of Saint Thomas's, Belfast, in 1884. He became Rector of Billy, County Antrim, in 1890, and of the united parishes of Ballymena and Ballyclug in 1893. From 1895 to 1903, he was chaplain to the Lord Lieutenant of Ireland, successively The 5th Earl Cadogan and The 2nd Earl of Dudley. In addition, he was Prebendary of Connor in Lisburn Cathedral, from 1898 to 1900. His next living was as Vicar of Belfast, from 1900 to 1903, and while there he was also appointed Dean of St Anne's Cathedral, Belfast, and examining chaplain to Bishop Welland.

In 1903, D'Arcy was elected Bishop of Clogher. In 1907 he was translated to become Bishop of Ossory, Ferns and Leighlin and in 1911 became Bishop of Down, Connor and Dromore, succeeding John Baptist Crozier in both.

He corresponded with Sir Shane Leslie in 1907 about Leslie's decision to convert to Roman Catholicism.

In 1907 he became a member of the Royal Irish Academy and was a Select Preacher at the University of Cambridge (1907–1908 and 1925), Hulsean Preacher at Cambridge (1929 to 1930) as well as a Select Preacher at the University of Oxford (1908–1910), the University of Glasgow (1912) the University of Durham (1923).

In August 1919, D'Arcy was appointed Archbishop of Dublin, Bishop of Glendalough and Kildare and Primate of Ireland. Less than a year later, in June 1920, he was elected as Archbishop of Armagh and Primate of All Ireland, again succeeding Crozier.

He was opposed to Irish Home Rule and in 1912 signed the Ulster Covenant. In 1921 he was appointed a member of the Senate of Southern Ireland, which was abolished with the establishment of the Irish Free State in 1922, but did not attend.

He was a lifelong friend of the 1st Viscount Craigavon, the first Prime Minister of Northern Ireland, and a member of the Athenaeum Club, London, and the University Club, Dublin. He was also a supporter of the Eugenics movement and chaired the Belfast branch of the Eugenics Education Society.

In 1934 he published his autobiography, The Adventures of a Bishop: a Phase in Irish Life, and in June 1937 announced that he intended to retire because of poor health. However, in the event, he continued as archbishop until he died on 1 February 1938. He was buried at St Patrick's Cathedral, Armagh, where there is a memorial to him in the north aisle.

== Marriage and family ==
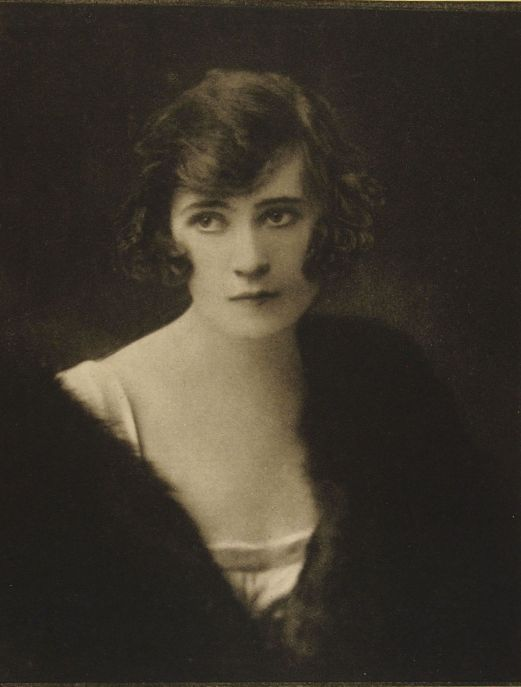
His daughter, Henrietta Grace Mulholland (née D'Arcy), Lady Dunleath of Ballywalter, from The Book of Fair Women, by E. O. Hoppé, 1922

In 1889, D'Arcy married Harriet Le Byrtt Lewis, daughter of Richard Lewis of Comrie, County Down, and they had one son and three daughters. Harriet died of a heart attack during a cruise to the West Indies in the summer of 1932. Of their three daughters, one married Charles Mulholland, 3rd Baron Dunleath, and became Lady Dunleath. Their son, John Conyers D'Arcy, Royal Artillery, fought in both World Wars and ended his career as the Commander of British forces in Palestine and Transjordan. In May 1920, D'Arcy gave his son a special licence to marry Noël Patricia Wakefield.

Between 1900 and 1903, D'Arcy corresponded with his uncle George James Norman D'Arcy about his uncle's petition to the Crown for the abeyant peerage of Darcy de Knayth. However, in 1903 the House of Lords awarded the title to Violet Herbert, Countess of Powis.

== Honours ==
- Honorary Doctor of Divinity, University of Oxford
- Honorary Doctor of Divinity, Queen's University, Belfast
- Honorary Doctor of Divinity, University of Glasgow
- Honorary Doctor of Letters, University of Dublin
- Fellow of the British Academy, 1927

== Selected publications ==
- A Short Study of Ethics (Macmillan, 1895, second edition, 1901)
- Idealism and Theology: a study of presuppositions (University of Dublin Donnellan Lectures for 1897–1898)
- Idealism and theology (Hodder, 1899)
- Ruling Ideas of Our Lord (Christian Study Manuals Series) (Hodder and Stoughton, 1901, second edition 1902)
- 'Articles on Consciousness, Leading Ideas, and Trinity', in Hastings' Dictionary of Christ and the Gospels
- Christianity and the Supernatural (Anglican Church Handbooks series) (1909)
- Christian Ethics and Modern Thought (Anglican Church Handbooks) (Longmans, Green, 1912)
- What is the Church? (Longmans, Green, 1914)
- God and Freedom in Human Experience (University of Dublin Donnellan Lectures for 1913–1914) (1915)
- God and the Struggle for Existence (Charles F. D'Arcy, B.H. Streeter, and Lily Dougall) (Association Press, New York, 1919)
- Anglican Essays (contributor) (1923)
- Science and Creation (1925)
- The Christian Outlook in the Modern World (1929)
- God in Science (J. Nisbet, 1930)
- Providence and The World-Order (Robertson Lectures, Glasgow University) (Round Table Press, 1932)
- The Adventures of a Bishop: a Phase in Irish Life (Hodder and Stoughton, 1934, autobiography)
- God and the struggle for existence (Association Press, 1996)

Church of Ireland titles
| Preceded by Charles Stack | Bishop of Clogher; 1903–1907 | Succeeded by Maurice Day |
| Preceded by John Baptist Crozier | Bishop of Ossory, Ferns and Leighlin; 1907–1911 | Succeeded by John Henry Bernard |
| Preceded by John Baptist Crozier | Bishop of Down, Connor and Dromore; 1911–1919 | Succeeded by Charles Thornton Primrose Grierson |
| Preceded by John Henry Bernard | Archbishop of Dublin (Church of Ireland); 1919–1920 | Succeeded by John Allen Fitzgerald Gregg |
| Preceded by John Baptist Crozier | Archbishop of Armagh (Church of Ireland); 1920–1938 | Succeeded by John Godfrey FitzMaurice Day |
