= Bishop of Down, Connor and Dromore =

The Bishop of Down, Connor and Dromore was the Ordinary of the Church of Ireland diocese of Down, Connor and Dromore; comprising all County Down and County Antrim, including the city of Belfast.

== History ==
The episcopal sees of Down and Connor were united in 1442. After the Reformation, the Church of Ireland Bishopric of Down and Connor continued until 1842 when they were amalgamated with the see of Dromore to form the united see of Down, Connor and Dromore. Since 1945, the see has been separated into the bishopric of Down and Dromore and the bishopric of Connor.

== List of bishops ==
Bishops of Down, Connor and Dromore
| From | Until | Incumbent | Notes |
|---|---|---|---|
| 1842 | 1848 | Richard Mant | Appointed Bishop of Down and Connor in 1823; became Bishop of Down, Connor and Dromore on 9 April 1842; died 2 November 1848. |
| 1849 | 1886 | Robert Knox | Nominated 2 April and consecrated 1 May 1849; translated to Armagh 11 May 1886. |
| 1886 | 1892 | William Reeves | Elected 18 March and consecrated 29 June 1886; died 12 January 1892. |
| 1892 | 1907 | Thomas Welland | Elected 19 February and consecrated 25 March 1892; died 29 July 1907. |
| 1907 | 1911 | John Crozier | Translated from Ossory, Ferns and Leighlin; elected 3 September and confirmed 26 September 1907; translated to Armagh 2 February 1911. |
| 1911 | 1919 | Charles D'Arcy | Translated from Ossory, Ferns and Leighlin; elected 27 March and confirmed 29 March 1911; translated to Dublin 6 August 1919. |
| 1919 | 1934 | Charles Grierson | Elected 9 October and consecrated 28 October 1919; resigned in November 1934; died 9 July 1935. |
| 1934 | 1942 | John MacNeice | Translated from Cashel and Waterford; elected 11 December and confirmed 12 December 1934; died 14 April 1942. |
| 1942 | 1945 | Charles King Irwin | Translated from Limerick, Ardfert and Aghadoe; elected 6 August and confirmed 17 November 1942; relinquished the sees of Down and Dromore 1 January 1945, but continued as Bishop of Connor. |
In 1945, the see was separated into the bishoprics of Down & Dromore and Connor.

== See also ==
- List of Anglican diocesan bishops in Britain and Ireland
- List of Anglican dioceses in the United Kingdom and Ireland
- List of Roman Catholic dioceses in Ireland
