= William Reeves (bishop) =

Irish antiquarian and bishop

William Reeves (16 March 1815 – 12 January 1892) was an Irish antiquarian and the Church of Ireland Bishop of Down, Connor and Dromore from 1886 until his death. He was the last private keeper of the Book of Armagh and at the time of his death was President of the Royal Irish Academy.

== Early life ==
Born at Charleville, County Cork, on 16 March 1815, Reeves was the eldest child of Boles D'Arcy Reeves, an attorney, whose wife Mary was a daughter of Captain Jonathan Bruce Roberts, land agent to the 8th Earl of Cork. This grandfather had fought at the Battle of Bunker's Hill, and Reeves was born at his house in Charleville.

From 1823, Reeves was educated at the school of John Browne in Leeson Street, Dublin, and after that at a school kept by Edward Geoghegan. In October 1830, he entered Trinity College Dublin, where he quickly gained a prize for Hebrew and was elected a Scholar in classics in 1833. In his third year, he became a scholar and went on to graduate BA in 1835. He proceeded to read medicine, won the Berkeley Medal, and graduated MB in 1837. His object in taking his second degree was that he intended to become a clergyman and to practice the medical profession among the poor of his parish.

== Life and work ==
In 1838, he was appointed Master of the diocesan school in Ballymena, County Antrim, and was ordained a deacon of Hillsborough. The next year, he was ordained a priest of the Church of Ireland at Derry.

In 1844, Reeves rediscovered the lost site of Nendrum Monastery when he visited Mahee Island in Strangford Lough, County Down, searching for churches recorded in 1306, and recognised the remains of a round tower.

By 1845, Reeves was corresponding with the Irish scholar John O'Donovan, and an archive of their letters between 1845 and 1860 is preserved at University College, Dublin. In July 1845, Reeves visited London.

Reeves's career was furthered by his learned work. His first book, published in 1847, was his Ecclesiastical Antiquities of Down, Connor and Dromore, but by then he was already a member of the Royal Irish Academy. By the time he published his Acts of Archbishop Colton (1850) he was also a Doctor of divinity. In 1850, as in 1847, he was Perpetual Curate of Kilconriola.

Reeves resided in Ballymena from 1841 to 1858, when he was appointed vicar of Lusk following the success of his edition of Adomnán's Life of Saint Columba (1857), for which the Royal Irish Academy had awarded him their Cunningham Medal in 1858. He had worked on this with Dr James Henthorn Todd, who was patron of the living at Lusk. Reeves's edition of Adomnán's Life of Columba has been called "the best and fullest collection of materials on the early Irish Church in one volume". With regard to the Celtic Church, Reeves himself described Adomnán's work as –

...an inestimable literary relic... perhaps, with all its defects, the most valuable monument of that ancient institution which has escaped the ravages of time.

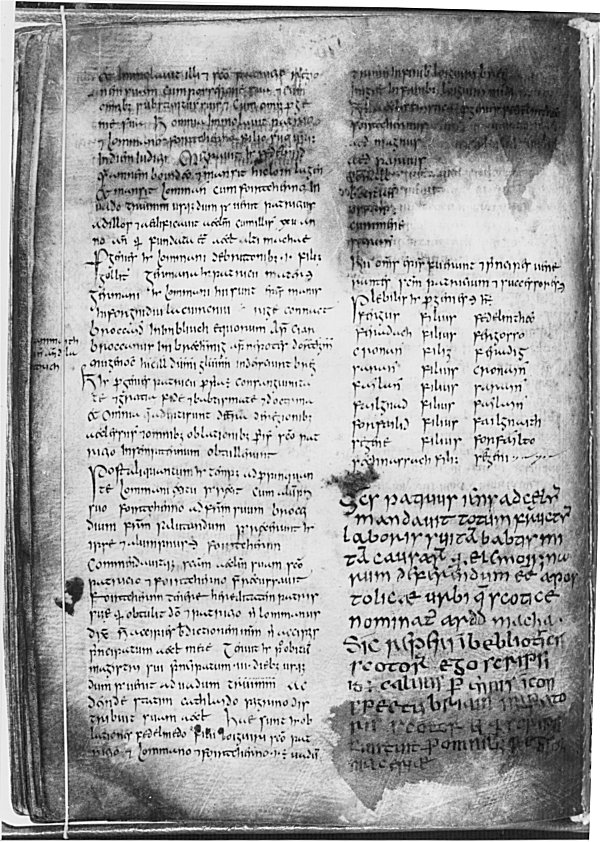
A folio of the Book of Armagh

In 1853, Reeves bought from the Brownlow family the important 9th-century manuscript known as the Book of Armagh, paying three hundred pounds for it. He sold the book for the same sum to Archbishop Beresford, who had agreed to present it to Trinity, Reeves's alma mater.

Crockford's Clerical Directory for 1868 gives him as "Reeves, William, DD, Rural Dean, Rector of Tynan, Librarian Armagh Library (Armagh)".

Reeves was a friend of Margaret Stokes and with his colleague Todd is credited with setting off her interest in Irish antiquities.

The author and antiquarian Samuel Ferguson wrote of Reeves in 1867:

It is in order and presentation of his facts that this great master of Scottish topographical history – using the word Scottish in its old acceptation – excels all who have gone before him.

In 1875 Reeves was appointed Dean of Armagh, a position he held until 1886 when he was appointed as Bishop of Down, Connor and Dromore. In 1891 he was elected as President of the Royal Irish Academy. As bishop, he resided at Conway House, Dunmurry, County Antrim, and signed his name "Wm. Down and Connor".

Reeves died in Dublin on 12 January 1892, while still President of the Academy. At the time of his death, he was working on a diplomatic edition of the Book of Armagh, by then in the Trinity College Library. The work was completed by Dr John Gwynn and published in 1913.

In November 1889, Reeves had bought the important collection of Irish manuscripts of Robert Shipboy MacAdam (1808–1895), a Belfast business man and archaeologist. In 1892, after Reeves's death, this collection was bought for the Royal Irish Academy by Maxwell Close and is still held by the Academy, under the name of 'The Mac Adam and Reeves Collection'.

Mary, Lady Ferguson, the widow of Reeves's friend Sir Samuel Ferguson, published a biography in 1893, The Life of the Right Rev. William Reeves, DD, Lord Bishop of Down, Connor and Dromore, and this reproduces a portrait of him.

A Catalogue of the Library of the Late Right Rev. William Reeves (1892) contains sections relating to the Royal Irish Academy, Scotland, Ireland, the Athanasian Creed, the Utrecht Psalter, the Old Testament, and 'Household Furniture'.

In 1941 Reeves's papers, including some in the Irish language, were donated to Marsh's Library by Dean Webster.

Reeves's Notices of Certain Crannogs... in the Counties of Antrim and Londonderry (1860) and his The Culdees of the British Islands (1864) both appeared in new editions in 1994.

There is a memorial to Reeves in the south aisle at St Patrick's Cathedral, Armagh.

== Publications ==
- 'A description of Nendrum, commonly called Mahee Island, embracing its present condition and past history', in Ulster Journal of Archaeology (second series) 8, 13–22, 58–68 (1845, reprinted 1902)
- Ecclesiastical Antiquities of Down, Connor and Dromore, consisting of a Taxation of those Dioceses (Dublin: Hodges and Smith, 1847)
- Five Chromolithographic Drawings, Representing an Irish Ecclesiastical Bell which is Supposed to Have Belonged to Saint Patrick, and the Several Sides of the Jewelled Shrine in which it is Preserved; Accompanied by a Historical and Illustrative Description (Marcus Ward & Co., 1850)
- Acts of Archbishop Colton in His Metropolitan Visitation of the Diocese of Derry (Dublin: Irish Archaeological Society, 1850)
- Description of the Codex Maelbrighte: An Irish Manuscript of the Four Gospels, Preserved in the British Museum (Dublin: M. H. Gill, printer to the Royal Irish Academy, 1851, "Extracted, by permission, from the Proceedings of the Royal Irish Academy, vol. V. pp. 45–67")
- Account of an Ancient Scotch Deed (1852)
- Kilnasaggart (1853)
- Saint Mura (1853)
- 'The Seal of Hugh O'Neill' in Ulster Journal of Archaeology, Vol. 1 (1853)
- 'The Island of Tiree', in Ulster Journal of Archaeology, Vol. 2 (1854)
- Memoir of the Church of Ballymena (1854)
- Papers on the Ancient Abbatial Succession in Ireland and the Irish Monastery of Honau, on the Rhine (Dublin: M. H. Gill, printer to the Royal Irish Academy, 1857)
- The Life of St Columba, founder of Hy; written by Adamnan, ninth Abbot of that Monastery, edited from an 8th-century codex (Dublin University Press for the Irish Archaeological and Celtic Society, 1857)
- Hymnus Sancti Aidi (from the Proceedings of the Royal Irish Academy, 8 November 1858)
- Memoir of the Church of St. Duilech in the Diocese of Dublin; Commonly Called Saint Doulagh's: Containing a Paper Read Before the Royal Irish Academy on Monday, 11 April 1859 (Printed at the Dublin University Press by M. H. Gill, 1859)
- Notices of Certain Crannogs, or Artificial Islands, Which Have Been Discovered in the Counties of Antrim and Londonderry (Dublin: M. H. Gill, 1860)
- On Marianus Scotus, of Ratisbon (1860)
- The Ancient Churches of Armagh: Being the Substance of a Paper Read Before the Armagh Natural History and Philosophical Society, on 14 March 1860 (Published by and printed for the author, 1860, 54 pp.)
- 'On Augustin, an Irish writer of the 7th Century', in Proceedings of the Royal Irish Academy, Vol. II, 1861
- On the Townland Distribution of Ireland, Read before the Royal Irish Academy 22 April 1861, and reprinted from the Proceedings of the Royal Irish Academy (Royal Irish Academy, 1861)
- Memoir of the Book of Armagh (Revised edition of an article published in Swords parish magazine, March and April 1861))
- Memoir of Stephen White (Royal Irish Academy, 1861)
- 'Saint Maelrubha: His History and Churches', in Proceedings of the Society of Antiquaries of Scotland, III (1857–60), pp. 258–96
- 'On the Island of Sanda', a paper read before the Royal Irish Academy on 14 April 1862 (Dublin, 1862)
- 'On Some Ecclesiastical Bells in the Collection of the Lord Primate', in Proceedings of the Royal Irish Academy, paper read on 14 December 1863
- On SS. Marinus and Anianus, Two Irish Missionaries of the Seventh Century (Royal Irish Academy, 1863)
- The Martyrology of Donegal: A Calendar of the Saints of Ireland, ed. with James Henthorn Todd from a translation by John O'Donovan (Dublin: Irish Archaeological and Celtic Society, 1864)
- The Culdees of the British Islands, as They Appear in History (Dublin: M. H. Gill, 1864)
- On the Céli-dé, Commonly Called Culdees (Dublin: Published by the Academy, 1864, 145 pages)
- A Sermon Preached at the Consecration of the Church of St. Patrick of Ardagh, in the Diocese of Clogher, on the 13th Day of October 1868 (1869, 35 pp.)
- 'On an Ancient Inscribed Shrine-arch' in Journal of the Historical and Archæological Association of Ireland, 1869
- Analysis of the United Dioceses of Dublin and Glendalough (Dublin, George Drought, 6, Bachelor's-walk, 1869)
- A Brief Statement of the Contents of the Diocese of Glendaloch Proper (1869)
- The Book of Common Prayer, According to the Use of the Church of Ireland (Dublin: Hodges, Foster, & Co., 1871)
- Life of St Columba (Edinburgh: Edmonton & Douglas, new edition 1874)
- Memoir of Octavian del Palacio, Archbishop of Armagh, MCCCCLXXX–MDXIII (Ponsonby and Murphy, at the University Press, 1875, impression of 100 copies reprinted from the Journal of the Royal Historical and Archæological Association of Ireland, Fourth Series, Vol. III)
- On a MS. Volume of Lives of Saints, chiefly Irish, now in Primate Marsh's Library, Dublin, commonly called the Codex Kilkenniensis, paper read before the Royal Irish Academy (Dublin University Press, 1877)
- 'A historical and descriptive memoir of the Clog an edachta, commonly known as St. Patrick's bell or the bell of Armagh' (1877)
- Observations upon a Letter from the Late John Forster, Presented to the Academy by the Lord Bishop of Killaloe (Ponsonby and Murphy, printers to the Royal Irish Academy, 1879)
- Introduction to William George Carroll's Succession of Clergy in the Parishes of S. Bride, S. Michael Le Pole, and S. Stephen, Dublin (1884)
- The Primacy of Ireland: Resident in the See of Armagh for Fourteen Centuries (1886)
- A Memoir of the Public Library of Armagh (Chiswick Press, 1886)
- The Epistles of St. Ignatius and St. Polycarp, with an Introductory Preface Comprising a History of the Christian Church in the Second Century (London: Griffith Farran Okeden & Welsh, 1889)
- Irish Form of Consecration of Churches (Society for Promoting Christian Knowledge, 1893, 31 pp.)
- A Lecture on the Antiquities of Swords: Delivered at Swords, in the Borough Schoolhouse, on Wednesday Evg., 12 Sep 1860 (C. W. Gibbs & Son, 1898)
- Nendhrum – Mahee Island (published posthumously, 1902)
- History of the Parish of Tynan in the County of Armagh: With Notices of the O'Neill, Hovenden, Stronge and Other Families Connected with the District (incorporating work by Reeves, completed by John J. Marshall) (Tyrone Printing Co., 1932)
- On the townland distribution of Ireland: a paper (Braid Books, 1992, ISBN 1-873345-01-1, ISBN 978-1-873345-01-6, 20 pp., republished from Royal Irish Academy paper of 1861 with contributions by Eull Dunlop)
- The Culdees of the British Islands, as They Appear in History: With an Appendix of Evidences (Llanerch, 1994, ISBN 1-897853-29-7, ISBN 978-1-897853-29-0)
- Notices of Certain Crannogs, or Artificial Islands, Which Have Been Discovered in the Counties of Antrim and Londonderry (new edn. by Moyola Books, 1994, ISBN 1-873345-15-1, ISBN 978-1-873345-15-3)

== Bibliography ==
- Meade, William E., A Bishop in the Church of God: A Sermon Preached in the Cathedral Church of S. Patrick, Armagh, at the Consecration of the Right Rev. William Reeves, D.D., Lord Bishop of Down and Connor, and Dromore, and the Right Rev. Charles Maurice Stack, D.D., Lord Bishop of Clogher, on S. Peter's Day, 1886 (1886)
- Catalogue of the Library of the Late Right Rev. William Reeves (1892)
- Garstin, John Ribton, Bibliography of the Works of William Reeves (Dublin: Ponsonby and Weldrick, 1893, 20 pages, "one hundred copies only printed for the author at the University Press")
- Ferguson, Mary Catharine, Life of the Right Rev. William Reeves, DD, Lord Bishop of Down, Connor and Dromore [includes Garstin's Bibliography of the Works of William Reeves] (Dublin: Hodges, Figgis, 1893; London: Longmans, Green, 1893)
- Garstin, John Ribton, Descriptive Catalogue of a Collection of Manuscripts Formerly Belonging to and Mainly the Handiwork of William Reeves... and Now Deposited in the Diocesan Library, Belfast (Published and printed by R. Carswell, 1899)
- Oulton, John Ernest Leonard, William Reeves: Bishop, Scholar, Antiquary; Resident in Ballymena, 1841–58; a Memorial Discourse Delivered in the Chapel of Trinity College, Dublin on Trinity Monday (24 May), 1937 (Dublin: Hodges, Figgis, & Co., 1937; reprinted by Mid-Antrim Historical Group, 1995, ISBN 1-873243-20-0, ISBN 978-1-873243-20-6)
- Thompson, John, 'William Reeves and the medieval texts and manuscripts at Armagh' in Peritia, 10 (Medieval Academy of Ireland, 1996), pp. 363–80
