= John Crozier (archbishop of Armagh) =

Church of Ireland archbishop (1853–1920)

The Right Reverend John Crozier MRIA
- Archbishop of Armagh; Primate of All Ireland
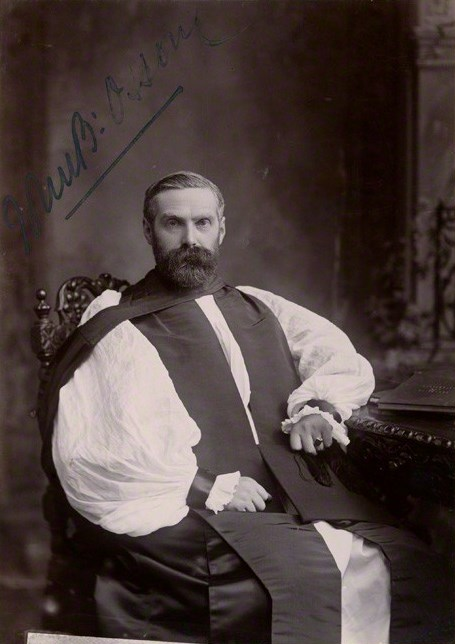
- Church: Church of Ireland
- Diocese: Armagh
- Elected: 2 February 1911
- In office: 1911-1920
- Predecessor: William Alexander
- Successor: Charles D'Arcy
- Previous posts: Bishop of Ossory, Ferns and Leighlin (1897-1907); Bishop of Down, Connor and Dromore (1907-1911)

Orders
- Consecration: 30 November 1897 by Joseph Peacocke

Personal details
- Born: 8 April 1853 Ballyhaise, County Cavan, Ireland
- Died: 11 April 1920 (aged 67) Armagh, County Armagh, Ireland
- Denomination: Anglican
- Parents: Baptist Barton Crozier; Catherine Mary Bolland
- Spouse: Alice Isabella Hackett
- Children: 4
- Education: Trinity College, Dublin

John Baptist Crozier MRIA (8 April 1853 – 11 April 1920) was a Church of Ireland bishop. He served as Bishop of Ossory, Ferns and Leighlin (1897–1907), Bishop of Down, Connor and Dromore (1907–1911), Primate of All Ireland and Archbishop of Armagh (1911–1920).

== Early life ==
John Baptist Crozier, eldest son of the Reverend Baptist Barton Crozier and Catherine Mary Crozier (née Bolland) of Rockview House, Knockfad, Ballyhaise, was born in the townland of Knockfad, Ballyhaise, County Cavan, on 8 April 1853. His paternal grandfather, John Crozier, was a member of a family long seated at Gortra House, between Magheraveely and Newtownbutler in the south-east of County Fermanagh, and his uncle was Captain John Crozier, an officer in the Fermanagh Militia and a Justice of the Peace. His mother was a daughter of John Bolland of Dublin.

== Ministry ==
He graduated from Trinity College, Dublin (T.C.D.), with a B.A. degree in 1872, a M.A. degree in 1875, and a B.D. and D.D. degree in 1888. He was a member of the Royal Irish Academy from 1916. He was a keen horseman, vice-president of the Holywood Cricket Club and one of the earliest members of The Wanderers Football Club of Dublin.

His extensive ministry began in 1876 in St Stephen's, Belfast. Successive appointments followed to: St. Anne's Parish Church on Donegall Street in Belfast (1877); Holywood, County Down (1880); Dunsford in Down Cathedral (1889); St. Patrick's Cathedral in Dublin (1896); and as chaplain to Bishop Knox (1885), to the Lord Bishop of Down (Welland) (1892), and to the Lord Lieutenant of Ireland (1891).

He was elected Bishop of Ossory, Ferns and Leighlin on 20 October 1897 and consecrated in St Patrick's Cathedral, Dublin, on 30 November 1897.

He translated to the Diocese of Down, Connor and Dromore in 1907, and on 2 February 1911 was elected, unanimously by the house of bishops, Archbishop of Armagh and Primate of All Ireland. He was enthroned in St Patrick's Cathedral, Armagh, on 17 March 1911 in succession to Archbishop Alexander who had resigned due to ill-health. A special train brought hundreds of people from Belfast for the ceremony, which was so crowded that several hundreds had to be refused admission.

In 1910, the then Bishop Crozier contributed Essay No. 28 in the 40-strong series Duty and Discipline.

== Family ==
He married, on 12 September 1877, Alice Isabella Hackett, third daughter of John and Jane Sophia Hackett of St James, Bray, and they had four children.

Their eldest son, Major-General Baptist Barton Crozier, who was born on 17 July 1878, married Ethel, the eldest daughter of William Humphries of Ballyhaise House, and they had a daughter, Cynthia, and a son, Ronald Baptist Barton Crozier. Major-General Crozier won numerous distinctions in the European war, including Officer of the Order of the Crown of Italy and Chevalier of the Legion of Honour.

Second son John Winthrop, who was born on 5 December 1879, was elected Bishop of Tuam, Killala and Achonry on 23 November 1938 and consecrated at Armagh Cathedral on 2 February 1939. He married, on 1 September 1910, Bertha Elizabeth McCall from Banbridge, County Down. He retired in 1957 and died on 15 February 1966.

Third son was Mervyn Packenham, born on 20 July 1881. He died at the Archbishop's Palace, Armagh, on 18 December 1914 and is buried at Armagh Cathedral.

Only daughter was Alice Maude who was born on 7 May 1884 and who married on 16 June 1908 Charles Chenevix Coote, son of Sir Algernon Coote, 12th Bt. of Ballyfin, County Laois, and had four children: Cecilla Maud, Mervyn Charles, Dermot Chenevix and Patricia Aileen.

== Death ==
Crozier died on 11 April 1920 at the Archbishop's Palace in Armagh and he is buried in the grounds of Armagh Cathedral, beside his wife, Alice Isabella, who died on 29 February 1928 at the residence of her daughter, Alice Coote of Grosvenor Place, Newcastle upon Tyne.

Their youngest son, Mervyn Packenham, who had died earlier in 1914, is buried in the same grave.

== Memorials ==
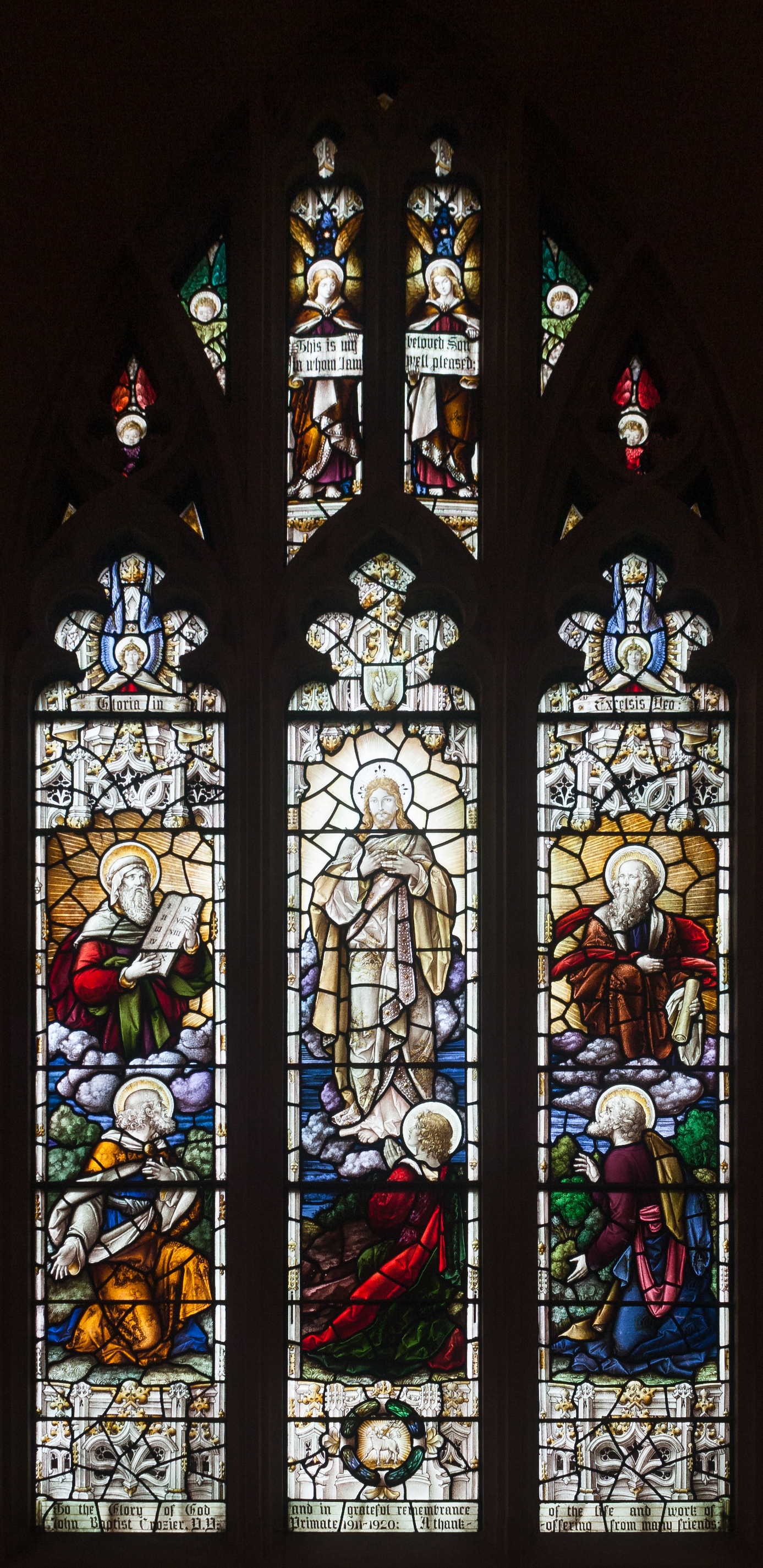
Memorial window in the north aisle of his cathedral by Shrigley and Hunt, depicting the transfiguration.

His memory is commemorated on a stained glass window in Armagh Cathedral, another window commissioned by him commemorates his son Mervyn. There is also a Memorial Plaque in Holywood Church.

In addition, portraits currently hang in the See House in Armagh and the Bishop's Palace in Kilkenny.

== Arms granted by Ulster Office of Arms ==
In 1893, separate Arms were granted to this branch of the family having been used by them since 1704.

Shield:- Or, on a cross, between four fleur de lys azure, a Crozier of the field

Crest:- A demi eagle displayed proper, charged on the beast with cross pattee or,

Motto:- Vi et virtute

== Notes ==
Church of Ireland titles
Preceded by Thomas Welland	Bishop of Ossory, Ferns and Leighlin; 1897–1907	Succeeded by Charles D'Arcy
Preceded by William Walsh	Bishop of Down, Connor and Dromore; 1907–1911	Succeeded by Charles D'Arcy
Preceded by William Alexander	Archbishop of Armagh; 1911–1920	Succeeded by Charles D'Arcy
