= Hugh Hanna =

Irish Presbyterian minister

The Reverend Hugh Hanna
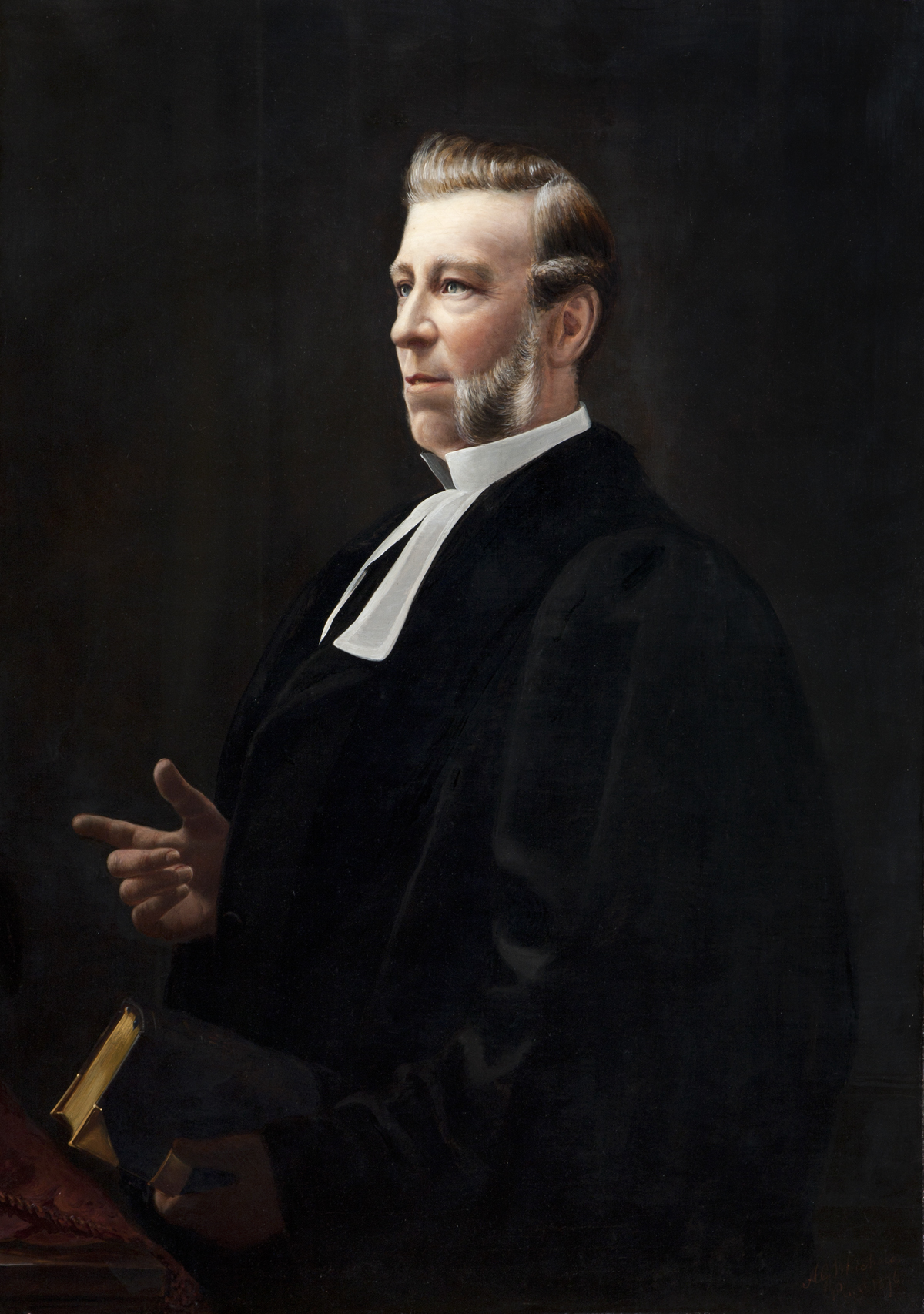
- Portrait by Augustus George Whichelo, 1876.
- Born: 21 February 1821; Dromara, County Down, Ireland
- Died: 3 February 1892 (aged 71)
- Occupation: Pastor
- Theological work
- Tradition or movement: Presbyterian

Hugh Hanna (21 February 1821 – 3 February 1892), nicknamed Roaring Hanna, was a Presbyterian minister in Belfast known for his anti-Catholicism.

== Biography ==
Born in Dromara, County Down, Hanna studied at Bullick's Academy in Belfast before becoming a draper. He was inspired by Josias Wilson to become a Sunday school teacher, then a full-time teacher at a religious school. During this period, he studied at the Belfast Academical Institution. In 1847, he decided to become a minister of the Presbyterian Church in Ireland. He began missionary work in north Belfast in 1851, founding a congregation in Berry Street, which moved to St Enoch's in Carlisle Circus in 1872.

Hanna organised a large number of both national and Sunday schools; in 1880, he was made a Commissioner of national education. He also spoke widely at religious revivalist meetings. In 1857, the Church of Ireland was asked by local magistrates to postpone open-air preaching, in an effort to calm sectarian tensions. Hanna, with the encouragement of Henry Cooke, objected to this, and preached in public, with widespread riots ensuing. A more successful rally followed in 1859, when Hanna addressed over 20,000 people in the Belfast Botanic Gardens. He fiercely opposed the Home Rule Bill of 1886, claiming that Roman Catholic police officers had been brought from other parts of Ireland in an attempt to intimidate Protestant opinion.

A black marble statue to Hanna was erected in Carlisle Circus in 1894; this was removed after it was damaged by an Irish Republican Army bomb in 1970. In 1985, his church, St Enoch's, was destroyed in a malicious fire.

== See also ==
- 1886 Belfast riots
