= John Gregg (bishop of Cork) =

Anglican bishop of Cork (1862–1878)

John Gregg D.D.
- Bishop of Cork, Cloyne and Ross
- Church: Church of Ireland

Personal details
- Born: 4 August 1798
- Died: 26 May 1878 (aged 79)
- Buried: Mount Jerome cemetery, Dublin
- Parents: Richard Gregg (father)
- Spouse: Elizabeth Law
- Children: 6 (including Robert Gregg)
- Education: Trinity College, Dublin

John Gregg (4 August 1798 – 26 May 1878) was an Anglican bishop.

He was born in 1798 near Ennis, County Clare, the son of Richard Gregg, a small landowner, and educated at Trinity College, Dublin. He was ordained in 1822, and quickly gained a reputation as an eloquent preacher, and was fluent in the Irish Language. He was rector of St. David's Church, Kilsallaghan, Co. Dublin. Gregg served as assistant and then as chaplain to the Bethesda Chapel, Dublin, from 1835, until 1839 when he became Rector of the newly established Holy Trinity Church, Gardner Street, Dublin, and then appointed Archdeacon of Kildare in 1857 before his elevation to the episcopate as the Bishop of Cork in 1862. As bishop he is mainly remembered for overseeing the building of Saint Fin Barre's Cathedral, at a cost of over £100,000. In 1865, he also oversaw the funding and construction of St. Edmund's Church, including a personal contribution of £500 (equivalent to £80,000 in 2025). He published "A Missionary Visit to Achill and Erris" (3rd edition) in 1850.

Gregg died in post on 26 May 1878 He had married Elizabeth Law and had six children. His son Robert Gregg and grandson, John Gregg were also bishops, and both became Archbishop of Armagh. His daughter, Frances (Fanny) Gregg was the founder of Saint Luke's Home, Cork (then known as "The Home for Protestant Incurables") in 1872.
