= Ford Tichborne =

Ford Tichborne (1862–1940) was an Irish 20th-century Anglican priest.

Born in County Tyrone in 1862 and educated at Trinity College, Dublin he held the important offices of Chancellor of Armagh Cathedral, Dean of Armagh (1928–1938) and Bishop of Ossory, Ferns and Leighlin (1938–1940).

Having become a Doctor of Divinity (DD), Tichborne died in 1940. There is a memorial to him in the north aisle at St Patrick's Cathedral, Armagh.
