= John MacNeice =

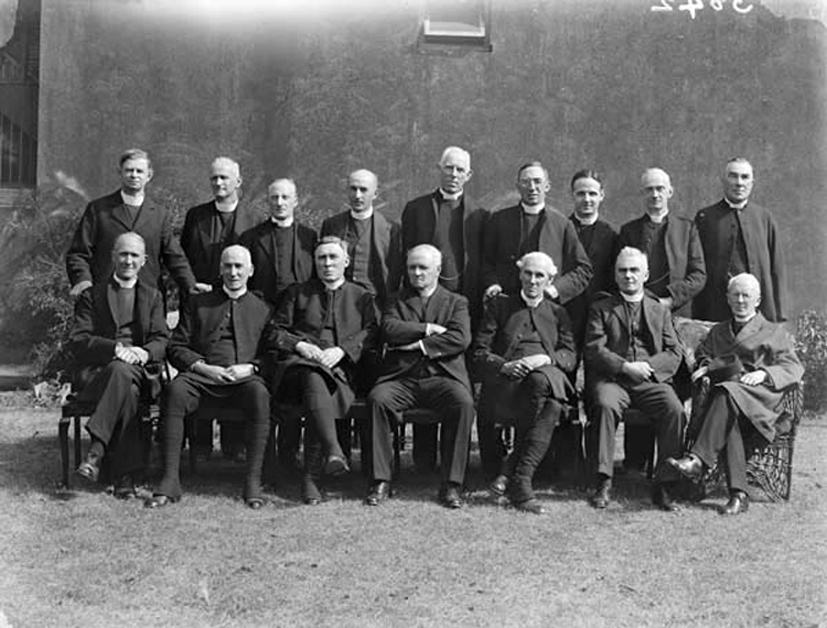
Bishop MacNeice is the 3rd person from left in the front row

John Frederick MacNeice (1866–1942), was born at Omey, Co. Galway, to a Protestant family which claimed descent from the kin of the early Irish saint MacNissi. Opting for the Church of Ireland ministry he served notably as rector of Carrickfergus, Co. Antrim and afterwards as bishop of Cashel, Emly, Waterford and Lismore (1931–1934) and until his death as bishop of Down, Connor and Dromore (1934–1942). MacNeice is well known for his symbolic opposition to the Partition of Ireland (accepted as a political reality): hence his refusal to allow the Union Flag to be laid on Carson's grave at his funeral in St Anne’s Cathedral, Belfast in 1935. MacNeice was twice married. One of his sons by his first marriage was the poet, Louis MacNeice.
