= Célé Petair =

Célé Petair (also called Caelopetrus, Calepetair, Céile Petair, Ceile Peter, Cele-Peadair, Cele-Peter, Cele-Petrus, Celi-Pedair, Celle-Peter, Celupteris, Kele-Petranus, Kele-Petrus, Petricola, Petrophilus; c. 700 – 758) was the Abbot of Armagh, Ireland from 750 to 758.

== Genealogy and Birth ==
Célé Petair was from Druim Chétna in the barony of Oneilland East, County Armagh. He was a member of the Uí Breasail clan of Clanbrassil who were descended from Breasal, son of Feidhlim, son of Fiachra Casan, son of Colla Fo Chrí. About the time that Célé Petair was born, the Uí Breasail split into the Uí Breasail Macha (who descended from Cumascach, son of Conchobar Corrach, king of Airthir who was killed at the battle of Tellach Garraisc in 698) and the Uí Bresail Airthir (who descended from Conchobar Corrach’s other son, Buachill). Other members of the Uí Breasail clan who became bishops of Armagh were Ailill the First and Ailill the Second, Tómméne, while Airechtach ua Fáeláin became an abbot of Armagh.

Célé Petair’s name is unique in medieval Ireland and means companion, follower or servant of Saint Peter. It was probably not his original name but one he took when entering the priesthood.

== Abbot of Armagh ==
Following the death of Congus, Abbot-Bishop of Armagh, in 750, the offices of abbot and bishop were separated. The "coarb of Patrick" was always an abbot, and the office of bishop of Armagh was subordinate to that of the abbot. Célé Petair was appointed as the 21st coarb in succession to Saint Patrick. Célé Petair reigned as abbot for 8 years.

== Death ==
Célé Petair died in 758. The Annals of Ireland give the following obits-

- Annals of the Four Masters 757- “Cele-Peadair, Abbot of Ard-Macha, died. He was of the Ui-Breasail.”
- Annals of Ulster 758- “Céile Petair from Crích Bresail, abbot of Ard Macha, died.”
