= Cú Dínaisc mac Conasaig =

Cú Dínaisc mac Conasaig (also called Cudinaisc, Cudinaisg, Cú Dínisc, Cudiniscus; c. 720 – 791) was the Abbot of Armagh, Ireland from 768 to 772.

== Genealogy and birth ==
Cú Dínaisc was a member of the Uí Eachach clan from the Ards Peninsula, County Down. His father was Concas (also called Conasach, Conasaig, Cú Ásaig, Cú Fásaig) who was descended from Cathbath, son of Eochaid Gonnat the High King of Ireland who died in 267 AD.

== Abbot of Armagh ==
On the death of Fer dá Chrích mac Suibni, the Abbot of Armagh, on 18 May 768, Cú Dínaisc was appointed as the 23rd coarb in succession to Saint Patrick. Cú Dínaisc was in contention with Dub dá Leithe I mac Sínaig for the abbacy and was forced out or resigned after 4 years in office.

== Death ==
Cú Dínaisc died in 791. The Annals of Ireland give the following obits:

- Annals of the Four Masters 790: "Cudinaisc son of Conasach, Abbot of Ard-Macha, died"
- Annals of Inisfallen 791: "Cú Dínisc son of Cú Ásaig, abbot of Ard Macha, rested"
- Annals of Ulster 791: "Cú Dínaisc son of Cú Fásaig, abbot of Ard Macha"
