= Ségéne =

Saint Ségéne (also called Segein, Segeni, Segeno, Seghene, Segin, Segine, Ségíne, Segineus, Segini, Seighin; c. 610 – 24 May 688) was the Bishop of Armagh, Ireland from 661 to 24 May 688.

== Genealogy and birth ==
St. Ségéne was from Achad Chlaidib (Field of the Sword), possibly the modern townland of Aghnacloy, Barony of Oneilland East, County Armagh. His father's name was Bresal.

== Priesthood ==
At this time the Irish Church was preoccupied with the Paschal cycle Question, i.e. how to compute the date of Easter and Christ's death. The southern part of Ireland accepted the Dionysian computation - which was now being used at Rome - at the Synod of Magh Lene in 630 AD. However, the Northern clergy were followers of the method proposed by Iona and its affiliate churches, known as the Irish Computation. In order to settle the matter Tómméne, the Bishop of Armagh, with some other Ulster bishops and clergy, sent a letter in the first half of 640 to Pope Severinus, setting out both sides of the argument and requesting his advice. However, Pope Severinus died on 2 August 640 without having opened the letter. The future Pope John IV and others in the Vatican hierarchy replied to the letter sometime between August and Christmas 640, beginning as follows: "Our most beloved and most holy Thomian, Columbanus, Croman, Diman, and Baithan bishops—to Croman, Hernian, Laistran, Scellan, and Segenus, presbyters—to Saran, and the rest of the Irish doctors or abbots." Rome was worried that the doctrine of Pelagianism was taking root in Ireland and advised against it in this letter. The "Segenus, presbyter" (Segeno presbyteris) mentioned in the letter was probably Saint Ségéne, which means he was a priest in 640, probably ministering in Armagh.

== Bishop of Armagh ==
Upon the death of Saint Tómméne, the Bishop of Armagh, on 10 January 661, St. Ségéne was appointed as the 17th coarb in succession to Saint Patrick. Saint Ségéne reigned as Bishop for 27 years.

Armagh was burned during his reign in 672. Some scholars state it was burned twice; however, this is an error as the second fire was in 690, two years after his death.

Before Ségéne died, Bishop Aed of Sletty, County Laois, placed his Leinster diocese under the protection of Armagh using a procedure of surrender and regrant. This was an important event as it emphasized the primacy of Armagh over Kildare. The Additamenta to the Book of Armagh record Aed's visit as follows- "Aed was bishop in Slebte. He went to Armagh. He brought his inheritance (i.e. The diocese of Sletty) to Ségéne in Armagh. Ségéne returned the inheritance to Aed, and Aed offered his inheritance and his kin and his church to Patrick for ever. Aed left his inheritance in the possession of Conchad (i.e. Conchad succeeded Aed as bishop of Sletty). Conchad went to Armagh, and Fland Feblae [Bishop of Armagh 689-716] gave him his church, and Conchad himself took the abbacy."

Aed probably did this for two reasons. Firstly to avoid being taken over by the neighbouring diocese of Kildare, as it would be easier to avoid complying with the demands of faraway Armagh. Secondly to encourage Armagh to observe Easter in the Roman custom, which was then the custom in Sletty.

== Death ==
St. Ségéne died on 24 May 688. The Annals of Ireland give the following obits-

- Annals of Clonmacnoise 683- "Segine Bishop of Ardmagh died"
- Annals of the Four Masters 686- "St. Seghene, Bishop of Ard-Macha, died. He was from Achadh-claidhibh".
- Annals of Inisfallen 687- "Repose of Ségíne, abbot of Ard Macha"
- Annals of Ulster 688- "Repose of Ségéne from Achad Claidib, bishop of Ard Macha"
- Chronicon Scotorum 688- "Repose of Segéne, bishop of Ard Macha"
- Annals of Tigernach 688- "The rest of Ségine, bishop of Armagh"
- Annals of Roscrea 688- "Quies Segeni episcopi Ard Machae"
- Fragmentary Annals of Ireland 688- "Bishop Ségine, abbot of Ard Macha, died"

== Feast day ==
After his death Ségéne was venerated as a saint and his feast was celebrated on 24 May, the day of his death. The Calendars of the Saints have the following entries-

- Martyrology of Gorman 24 May- "Segein, bishop of Armagh."
- Martyrology of Tallaght 24 May- "Segin Airdmacha"
- Bollandists Acta Sanctorum, Tomus V, Maii xxiv. Among the pretermitted saints, p. 270- "Festival of Segineus"
- Martyrology of Donegal 24 May- "Seighin, Bishop, of Ard-Macha, A.D. 687"
