= Fland Feblae mac Scandláin =

Bishop of Armagh, Ireland (c. 640–715 CE)

Saint Fland Feblae mac Scandláin (also called Flan Febla, Flann Feabhla, Flann Febhla, Flann ffeaula, Flann of the Foyle, Flann Feapla, Flanno Feaplo, Flann Fewla, Florence Febla; c. 640 – 715) was the Bishop of Armagh, Ireland from 688 to 715.

== Genealogy and Birth ==
Fland Feblae was from Monaghan barony in the county of Monaghan. He was the son of Scandlán mac Fíngin, the king of the Uí Méith Macha (alias Uí Méith Tire) clan who ruled that district. Scandlán died in 674/5 (AT, AU, CS [AFM 672]). Fland Feblae was descended from Colla Fo Chrí as follows- "Flann feabhla m Scannlain m Fingin m Aodha m Fiachrach m Fiacha m Eogain m Briuin m Muireadhaig meith m Iomcadha m Colla da crioch"., which is also confirmed in the Naemsenchus Náemh nÉrenn as- "Flann Feabla mac Scandlain cain do síol Colla co ccatgail."

Fland's paternal uncle was Saint Maoldoid, Abbot of Muckno, Co. Monaghan, whose feast day is 13 May and who died in 665 (AT). Fland Feblae was probably a younger son as his brother Maol Murcair seems to have succeeded to the kingship on Scandlán's death. The family of O’Hanratty or O’Hinnreachtaigh claim descent from Maol Murcair as follows- "Lornhar m Muirchertaigh m Duiblh dara m Scanlain m Innreachtaigh m Gairbith m Ainfeith m Mail brighde m Duibh innrechtaigh m Taidhg m Innrechtaigh m Muiredaigh m Maoil murcair m Scannlain".

== Berchán mac Micáin ==
When he was a young boy Fland Feblae was sent to be fostered by Berchán, son of Micán. Berchán was a poet who composed the poem beginning "Ind ráth hi Comair in dairfheda" and possibly the poem "Celebrad én ar m’airi". This fosterage under a poet probably explains why Fland Feblae was later referred to as a "súi epscop" (A scholar bishop).

== Bishop of Armagh ==
On the death of Saint Ségéne, the Bishop of Armagh, on 24 May 688, Fland Feblae was appointed as the 18th coarb in succession to Saint Patrick. Fland Feblae reigned as Bishop for 27 years. When he was two years into his reign Armagh was burned in 690. The Annals of Ulster for 690 state- "The burning of Ard Macha".

== Sletty diocese ==
Before Bishop Ségéne died, Bishop Aed of Sletty, County Laois, placed his Leinster diocese of Sletty under the protection of Armagh using a procedure of surrender and regrant. This was an important event as it emphasized the primacy of Armagh over Kildare. Bishop Conchad, who was Aed's successor in Sletty, subsequently went to Armagh when Fland Feblae was made Bishop in order to renew the vows of obedience to him. The Additamenta to the Book of Armagh record those events as follows- "Aed was bishop in Slebte. He went to Armagh. He brought his inheritance [i.e. The diocese of Sletty] to Ségéne in Armagh. Ségéne returned the inheritance to Aed, and Aed offered his inheritance and his kin and his church to Patrick for ever. Aed left his inheritance in the possession of Conchad (i.e. Conchad succeeded Aed as bishop of Sletty). Conchad went to Armagh, and Fland Feblae gave him his church (i.e. Sletty), and Conchad himself took the abbacy."

Bishop Aed probably did this for two reasons. Firstly to avoid being taken over by the neighbouring diocese of Kildare, as it would be easier to avoid complying with the demands of faraway Armagh. Secondly to encourage Armagh to observe Easter in the Roman custom, which was then the custom in Sletty.

== The Manor of Tara ==
In the old text "Suidigud Tellaig Temra" (The Settling of the Manor of Tara), the nobles of Ireland were attempting to partition the High King's demesne of Tara and they send for Fland Feblae as follows- "The nobles of Ireland were then summoned to the feast to the house of Tara by Diarmait son of Cerball. And they said that they would not partake of the feast of Tara until the settling of the manor of Tara was determined, how it was before their day and how it would be after them for all time, and they delivered that answer to Diarmait. And Diarmait replied that it was not right to ask him to partition the manor of Tara without taking counsel of Flann Febla son of Scannlan son of Fingen, that is, the head of Ireland and the successor of Patrick, or of Fiachra son of the embroideress. Messengers were accordingly dispatched to Fiachra son of Colman son of Eogan, and he was brought unto them to help them, for few were their learned men, and many were their unlearned, and numerous their contentions and their problems."

This tale is replicated in the Prose Tales in the Rennes Dindshenchas (ed. Whitley Stokes) as follows-

"This is the story of the notable steads of Ireland, which Amorgein mac Aulay, the poet to the Dési of Tara, composed. He was Diarmait son of Cerball’s poet. Tis he that made demand of Finntan son of Lamech at Tara, when there was a convention of the men of Erin round the king of Tara, Diarmait son of Cerball, and round Fland Febla son of Scandlán a successor of (Saint) Patrick, and round a sage of the men of Ireland, Cenn-foelad son of Ailill, son of Eogan, son of Niall and round Finntan son of Lamech the chief elder of Ireland. And Amorgein fasted on Finntan for three days and three nights, in the presence of the men of Erin and boys and girls at Tara, so that Finntan might declare to him the stories of the noteworthy steads of the island of Erin, because Finntan had dismissed from it every person and every generation from the time of Cessair daughter of Bith — ’tis he who first occupied Ireland — till the reign of Diarmait son of Cerball.”

== Synod of Birr ==
In 697 a Mordail or General Convention was held in Birr, County Offaly in order to draw up laws for all Ireland. About 91 rulers of Church and State attended. Forty churchmen attended and the president of the synod and name at the top of the list of attendees and guarantors was Fland Feblae, which points to Fland being recognized as the head of the Irish church. Armagh then followed the Roman custom of fixing the date of Easter but the community of Iona under Saint Adomnán still followed the Irish tradition of fixing the date. Adomnán also attended the synod and by allowing Fland Feblae to be president it was seen as an acknowledgement that Armagh held the primacy of Ireland and not Iona. The High-King of Ireland Loingsech mac Óengusso and 50 other chiefs also attended the synod. At the Synod Adomnán proposed the "Law of the Innocents" or Cáin Adomnáin which protected women, children and clergy from attack.

== Death ==
Fland Feblae died on either 24 April or 24 July 715. The Annals of Ireland give the following obits-

- Annals of the Four Masters 704- “Flann Feabhla, son of Scanlan, Abbot of Ard-Macha, died”
- Annals of Inisfallen 715- “Flann Febla, abbot of Ard Macha, rested”
- Annals of Ulster 715- “Flann Febla son of Scannlán of the Uí Méith, abbot of Ard Macha, died”
- Chronicon Scotorum 706- “Flann Febla, abbot of Ard Macha, rested”
- Annals of Tigernach 715- “Flann Febla, abbot of Armagh, died”
- Annals of Clonmacnoise 712- “Flann ffeaula, abbot of Ardmach, died”
- Annals of Roscrea 706- “Fland Feabla, ab Ard Macha, moritur hoc anno”

== Feast Day ==
After his death Fland Feblae was venerated as a saint. Ware states his feast day was 24 April but Genealogiae Regum et Sanctorum Hiberniae states it was 24 July. The Martyrologies do not mention him.
