= Mac Laisre =

Saint Mac Laisre easbacc m Luighdeach (also called Mac Lasre, MacLaisre, M’Lasre, Macc-Laisre, mcLasre, M.Laisre; c. 560 – 12 September 623 was the Bishop of Armagh, Ireland from 610 to 12 September 623.

== Genealogy and birth ==
Mac Laisre was descended from the High King of Ireland Niall of the Nine Hostages and his genealogy is "Mac Laisre easbacc m Luighdeach m Ronain m Tuadain m Aodha m Fearghosa m Eoghain m Neil naoighiallaig. Archiepiscopus Ardmachanus, obijt 622, 12 Sep." His paternal uncle was St. Colman Muilinn, of Derrykeighan, County Antrim.

An alternative genealogy is found in some texts as follows- "Maclaisre easbacc m Conaill eachluaith m Luighdeach menn m Aonghasa tirigh m Fir cuirb m Modha cuirb m Corbmaic cais m Oilealla oluim m Modha nuadad m Modha ned". This is unlikely to be correct for two reasons. Firstly his position in this genealogy would place him about the middle of the 5th century which is over a hundred years earlier than his birth. Secondly it would make him a Munsterman and as the local Armagh tribes at the time of his tenure had a firm grip on the right to choose the Bishop of Armagh, it is unlikely they would give the post to a person from Munster. The See at this time was always held by Ulstermen.

Mac Laisre’s name has caused confusion to scholars through the centuries. At first glance it means ‘Son of Laisir’ and some writers like Colgan, Ware, Cotton and O’Hanlon assumed that Laisir was his father’s name and that Mac Laisre was an epithet and not his real name. This led them down the path of seeking an incorrect alternative identification such as the person called "Terenannus Archipontifex Hibernia" in the Life of St. Laurence, Archbishop of Canterbury. However we know from the genealogies that Mac Laisre’s father’s name was not Laisir but Luighdeach. This led others to suggest Lasar was his mother’s name and therefore Mac Laisre is a matronymic rather than a personal name. However the names of several different persons named Mac Laisre appear in the early genealogies and no alternative proper personal first name is ever found for them. This must therefore mean that Mac Laisre is neither an epithet, patronymic or matronymic but a proper personal first name. Vernam Hull was of the opinion that- ‘Mac Lasre seems to mean "Son of Flame". If so, the nominative singular of Lasre is Lasar (not Laisir)’.

== Bishop of Armagh ==
On the death of Saint Senach, the Bishop of Armagh, on 11 April 610, St. Mac Laisre was appointed as the 15th coarb in succession to Saint Patrick. Saint Mac Laisre reigned as Bishop for 13 years.

== Death ==
St. Mac Laisre died on 12 September 623. The Annals of Ireland give the following obits-

- Annals of the Four Masters 622- "Mac Laisre, Bishop and Abbot of Ard-Macha, died"
- Annals of Ulster 623- "Repose of Mac Laisre, abbot of Ard Macha", with an interpolated gloss ‘Epscop Ardm .i. dab ainm Mc Lasre’ (Bishop of Armagh i.e. by the name of Mc Lasre)
- Chronicon Scotorum 623- "Repose of Mac Laisre, abbot of Ard Macha"
- Annals of Roscrea 623- "Quies M. Laisre abbatis Ardmachae"
- Annals of Tigernach 624- "The rest of Mac Laisre, abbot of Armagh"
- Annals of Inisfallen 624- "Repose of Mac Laisre, bishop of Ard Macha"
- Annals of Clonmacnoise 624- "mcLasre abbot of Ardmach Died"
- Annals from the Book of Leinster- "Macc-Laisre, abbot of Armagh"

== Feast day ==
After his death St. Mac Laisre was venerated as a saint and his feast was celebrated on 12 September, the day of his death. The Calendars of the Saints have the following entries-

- Martyrology of Gorman 12 September- "Mac Lasre, a bishop and abbot of Armagh"
- Martyrology of Tallaght 12 September - "Mac Lasre"
- Martyrology of Donegal 12 September - "Maclaisre, Bishop and Abbot, of Ard-Macha, A.D. 622. I think it is he that is of the race of Eoghan, son of Niall; or it may be he is of the race of Corbmac Cas, son of Oilioll Olum"
