= Archbishop of Armagh =

Archiepiscopal title

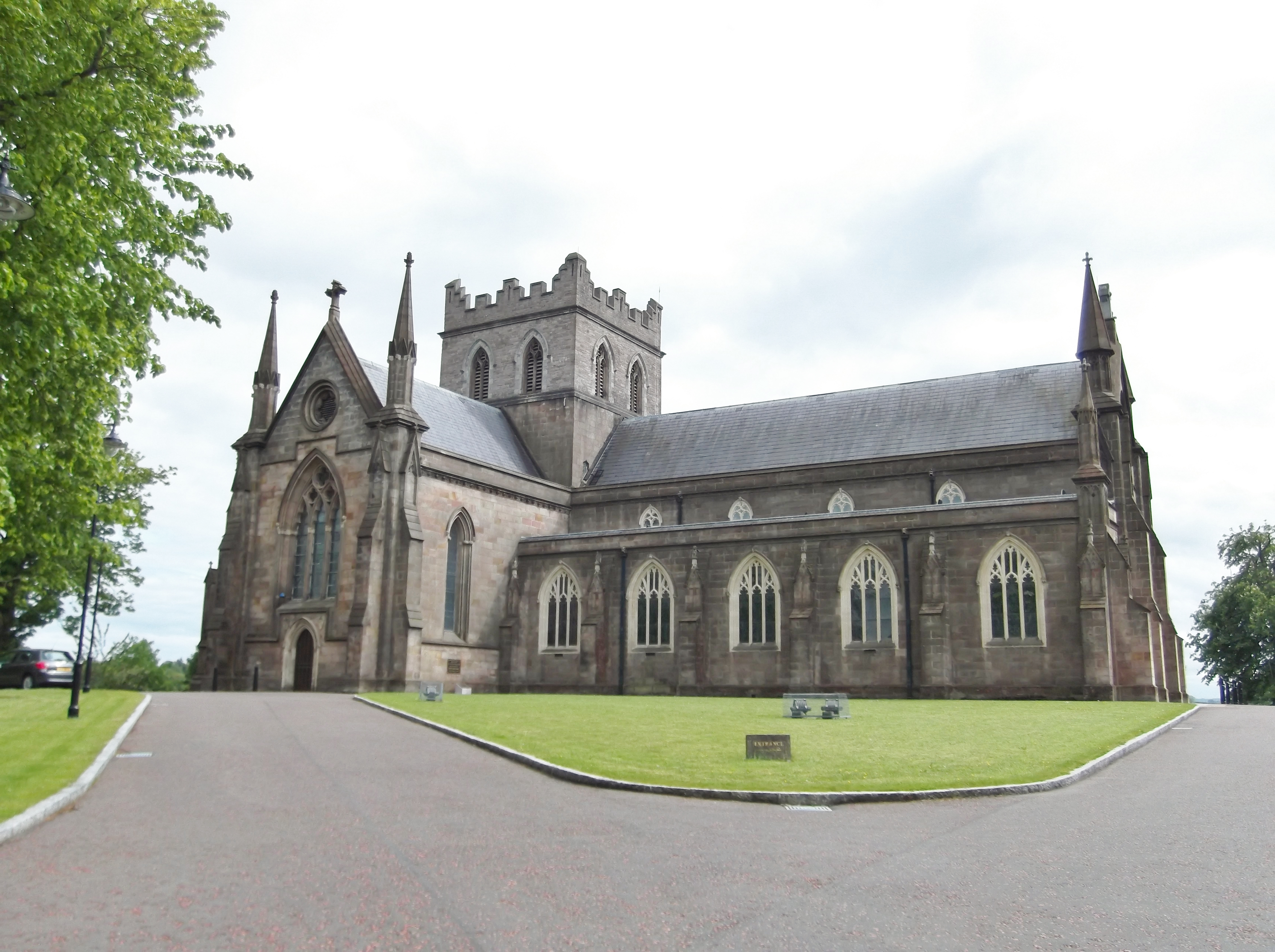
St Patrick's Church of Ireland Cathedral, Armagh, the episcopal seat of the Catholic and, after the Reformation, Church of Ireland archbishops.

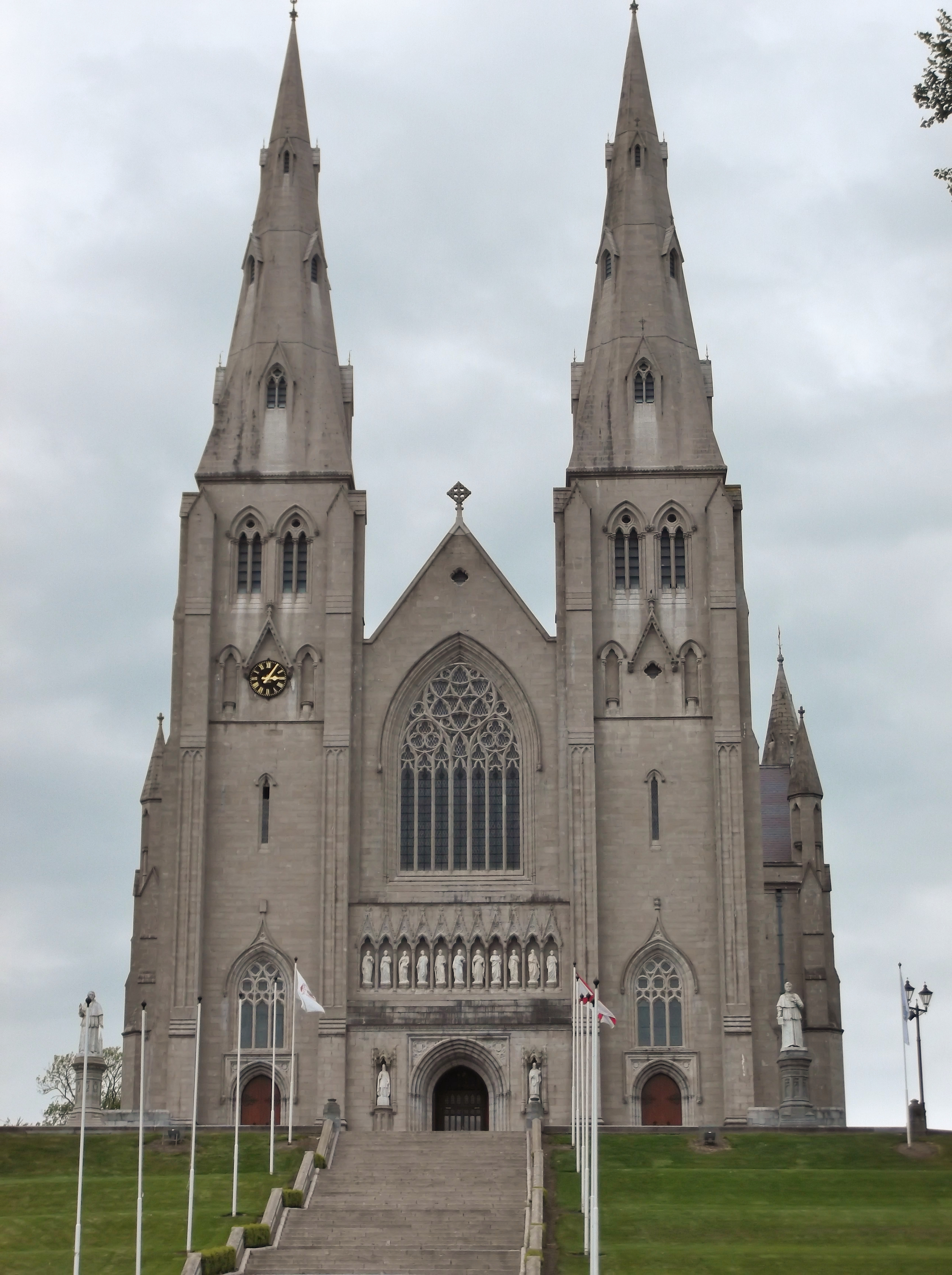
St Patrick's Catholic Cathedral, Armagh, the episcopal seat of Catholic archbishops after the Reformation.

The Archbishop of Armagh is an archiepiscopal title which takes its name from the see city of Armagh in Northern Ireland. Since the Reformation, there have been parallel apostolic successions to the title: one in the Catholic Church and the other in the Church of Ireland. The archbishop of each denomination also holds the title of Primate of All Ireland.

In the Church of Ireland, the archbishop is John McDowell, who is the ecclesiastical head of the Church of Ireland and the diocesan bishop of the Diocese of Armagh. He was elected as archbishop in March 2020 and translated to the role on 28 April 2020.

In the Catholic Church, the archbishop is Eamon Martin, who is the ecclesiastical head of the Catholic Church in Ireland, metropolitan of the Province of Armagh and the ordinary of the Archdiocese of Armagh. He succeeded on 8 September 2014, having been ordained Coadjutor Archbishop of Armagh on 21 April 2013 at St Patrick's Cathedral, Armagh.

== History ==
In the medieval Irish church, the earliest bishops doubled as abbots, with the bishop becoming the junior of the two positions. From the 8th century, if not earlier, the house of Armagh claimed foundation from Saint Patrick, and the position of comarba Pátraic ("successor of Patrick") was held by the abbot of Armagh until the position of abbot and bishop were merged again in the 12th century, with the creation of the archbishopric of Armagh.

== Early abbots and bishops of Armagh ==
Early abbots and bishops of Armagh
Tenure	Ordinary	Notes.
dates uncertain	Saint Patrick; Irish: Pátraic	Founder of the bishopric in around 444; resigned, but date unknown; died 17 March, but the year is uncertain, the Annals of Ulster record the repose (i.e., death) of three bishops of the same name in 457, 461 and 493; also known as Patricius or St Patrick.
d. 447/8 (or 457)	(Saint Secundinus; Irish: Sechnall mac Restituit)	Occurs in the list in the Book of Leinster; served as an assistant to Bishop Pátraic; considered to be the founder of Dunshaughlin (Domnach Seachnaill); died 27 November 447/8 (or 457); also known as Seachnaill and St Secundinius.
dates uncertain	(Sen-Phátraic)	Occurs in the list in the Book of Leinster, but may not really existed; his name means "Old Patrick"; died 24 August, but the year not recorded, however, the Annals of Ulster record the "repose (i.e., death) of the elder Patrick" in 457.
d. 467/8	Benignus of Armagh (Saint Benan; Benén mac Sescnén)	Died 9 November 467 or 468.
d. 481	Saint Iarlaithe mac Treno	Died 11 February 481; also known as Saint Jarlath.
d. 497	Saint Cormac of Armagh	Called bishop and abbot; styled heres Patricii in the Annals of Ulster, 'first abbot' in the official list; died 17 February 497.
d. 513	Dubthach the First	Called bishop; also known as Dubtach.
d. 526	Saint Ailill the First	Called bishop; died 13 January 526; also known as Ailid or Olild .
d. 536	Saint Ailill the Second	Called bishop; died 1 July 536; also known as Ailid.
d. 548	Saint Dubthach the Second	Called abbot; perhaps identical with Bishop 'Dauid Farannaini' (Dauid mac Guairi ui Farannáin), whose death is appended in a late hand in the Annals of Ulster in 551; also known as Duach, but see entry for Fiachra mac Colmain.
d. 558	Saint Fiachra mac Colmain	Called abbot.
d. 578	Saint Fedelmid Find	Called abbot.
d. 588	Saint Carláen	Called bishop; died 24 March 588; also known as Cairlan, Ciarláech and Cairellán.
d. 598	Eochu macDiarmaid	Called abbot; also recorded as Eochaid.
d. 610	Saint Senach	Called abbot.
d. 623	Saint Mac Laisre	Called abbot; died 12 September 623.
d. 661	Saint Tómméne	Called bishop; died 10 January 661; also recorded as St Tommine .
d. 688	Saint Ségéne	Called bishop; died 24 May 688; after Ségéne the Book of Leinster inserts an unnamed Forannán with the reign of 1 year.
d. 715	Saint Fland Feblae mac Scandláin	Called abbot and bishop.
d. 730	Saint Suibne	Called bishop; died 21 June 730; also known as Suibne nepos mac Crundmaíl or Suibne nepos Mruichessaich.
d. 750	Congus	Called bishop (also scribe)

== Later abbots and bishops of Armagh ==
=== Abbots of Armagh ===
Later abbots of Armagh
Tenure	Ordinary	Notes.
d. 758	Célé Petair	Also known as Céile Petair from Crích Bresail, or Cele-Peter.
d. 768	Saint Fer dá Chrích mac Suibni	
? res. c. 772	Cú Dínaisc mac Conasaig	Possibly resigned c. 772; died 791.
d. 793	Dub dá Leithe I mac Sínaig	Member of the Clann Sinaig.
dep. 793	Fóendelach mac Móenaig	Deposed.
d. 794	Airechtach ua Fáeláin	Died on the same night as Bishop Affiath; also known as Airechtach grandson of Faelán alias grandson of Fledach.
d. 795	Fóendelach mac Móenaig (again)	Re-installed.
d. 806	Gormgal mac Dindataig	Also abbot of Clones; omitted from the list together with Fland Roí mac Cummascaig, who took the abbey by force (his grandfather, Conchobar, was killed in 698), rival to Fóendelach; also known as Gormgal mac Dindanaig, mac Dindagaid, or mac Indnotaig.
d. 807	Condmach mac Duib dá Leithe	Member of the Clann Sinaig; in opposition to abbots Fóendelach and Gormgal; recognised as coarb in the Annals of Ulster in 804.
d. 808	Torbach mac Gormáin	Died 16 July 808.
d. 809	Toicthech ua Tigernaig	Not in the official list.
d. 812	Saint Nuadu of Loch Uama	Also bishop of Armagh and anchorite.
d. 826	Flandgus mac Loingsig	Also known as Fergus mac Loingsig.
deposed 827/8	Artrí mac Conchobair	Acted as abbot and Coarb (or possibly on behalf of Flandgus) in 818, 823, 825; also was bishop of Armagh from 794; died 833.
d. 830	(? Suibne mac Forandáin)	Called Abbas duorum mensium in the Annals of Ulster, and abbot of Devenish in the Chronicon Scotorum; not in the official list; also known as Suibne mac Fairnig.
d. 834	Eógan Mainistrech mac Ainbthig	Also fer léigind (i.e., Lector) of Monasterboice and (since 830) abbot of Clonard.
d. 852	Forindán mac Murgile	Rival abbot to Diarmait ua Tigernáin; also bishop of Armagh and scribe.
d. 852	Diarmait ua Tigernáin	Rival abbot to Forindán mac Murgile.
d. 856	(? Cathassach)	Only in the Annals of Inisfallen and the Fragmentary Annals of Ireland; but the Annals of the Four Masters call him fer tigis (i.e., oeconomus).
d. 874	Féthgno mac Nechtain	Also bishop of Armagh; died 6 October 874.
deposed 877	Máel Cobo mac Crundmaíl	Deposed 877.
deposed 877/8	Ainmere ua Fáeláin	Deposed 877/8, died 879.
restored 877/8	Máel Cobo mac Crundmaíl (again)	Restored 877/8; the four years assigned to his successor Cathassach mac Robartaig, who died in retirement in 883, suggests that Máel Cobo's capture by the Norse in 879 put an end to his tenure of office; died 888 .
d. 883	Cathassach mac Robartaig	Also bishop of Armagh.
d. 927	Máel Brigte mac Tornáin	Also Coarb of Colum Cille in 891.
d. 936	Ioseph mac Fathaig	Also bishop of Armagh and anchorite; also known as Joseph .
d. 936	Máel Pátraic mac Máel Tuile	Also bishop of Armagh.
d. 957	Cathassach mac Doilgén	Also bishop of Armagh.
dep. 965	Muiredach mac Fergussa	Deposed 965; died 966.
d. 998	Dub dá Leithe II mac Cellaig	Member of the Clann Sinaig; also Coarb of Colum Cille in 989.
resigned 1001	Muirecén mac Ciaracáin	Of "Both Domnaig" (Bodoney, County Tyrone); acting as Coarb 993; resigned 1001, died 1005.
d. 1020	Máel Muire mac Eochada	Member of the Clann Sinaig; son of fer léigind Eochaid ua Flainn (died 1004) and nephew of Abbot Dub dá Leithe II (died 998); died in office 1020.
d. 1049	Amalgaid mac Máel Muire	Member of the Clann Sinaig.
d. 1064	Dub dá Leithe III Máel Muire	Member of the Clann Sinaig; also fer léigind (i.e., Lector) since 1046.
d. 1074	Cummascach Ua hErodáin	In opposition to Dub dá Leithe III.
d. 1091	Máel Ísu mac Amalgada	Member of the Clann Sinaig; died 18 December 1091.
d. 1105	Domnall mac Amalgada	Member of the Clann Sinaig; died August 1105.
d. 1129	Cellach of Armagh (Saint Cellach; Irish: Cellach mac Áeda meic Máel Ísu)	Member of the Clann Sinaig; consecrated bishop of Armagh on 23 September 1105 and elevated to archbishop in 1106; died 1 April 1129; also known as Saint Ceallach and Celsus.
1129 to 1134	Muirchertach mac Domnall	Member of the Clann Sinaig; died 17 September 1134; also known as Maurice MacDonald, and Murrough.
resigned 1137	Niall mac Áeda meic Máel Ísu	Member of the Clann Sinaig; died 1139.

=== Bishops of Armagh ===
Later bishops of Armagh
Tenure	Ordinary	Notes.
d. 794	Affiath	Died on the same night as Abbot Airechtach (see above).
d. 812	Saint Nuadu of Loch Uama	Also abbot of Armagh and anchorite.
d. 833	Artrí mac Conchobair	Bishop of Armagh since 794; acted as abbot and Coarb (or possibly on behalf of Flandgus) in 818, 823, 825; died 833.
d. 852	Forindán mac Murgile	Also abbot of Armagh.
d. 863	Máel Pátraic mac Findchon	
d. 874	Féthgno mac Nechtain	Also abbot of Armagh.
d. 883	Cathassach mac Robartaig	Also abbot of Armagh.
d. 893	Mochtae daltae Féthgno	Also scribe and anchorite.
d. 895	Máel Aithgin	
d. 903	Cellach mac Sóergussa	Also anchorite.
d. 915	Máel Ciaráin mac Eochocáin	
d. 936	Ioseph mac Fathaig	Also abbot of Armagh and anchorite; also known as Joseph.
d. 936	Máel Pátraic mac Máel Tuile	Also abbot of Armagh.
d. 957	Cathassach mac Doilgén	Also abbot of Armagh.
d. 967	Cathassach mac Murchadáin	
d. 994	Máel Muire mac Scandláin	
d. 1006	Airmedach mac Coscraig	
d. 1012	(? Cenn Fáelad Sabaill)	Anchorite; said to be a 'pilgrim', and probably was not bishop of Armagh.
d. 1032	Máel Tuile	
d. 1056	Áed Ua Forréid	May have resigned the bishopric when he became fer léigind (i.e., Lector) in 1049.
d. 1096	Máel Pátraic mac Airmedaig	
d. 1106	Cáenchomrac Ua Baigill	Consecrated 29 May 1099.
After the see was elevated to an archbishopric in 1106, the Annals of Ulster record three more bishops of Armagh, but they probably ruled the see of Cinél nEógain (Ardstraw/Maghera), which later became the see of Derry.
1107 to 1122	Máel Coluim Ua Broicháin	Styled bishop of Ard Macha; probably combined duties as bishop under the old regime with diocesan care over the see of Cinél nEógain; consecrated 13 September 1107; died at Derry in 1122.
d. 1139	Máel Brigte Ua Broicháin	Styled bishop of Ard Macha; probably combined duties as bishop under the old regime with diocesan care over the see of Cinél nEógain; died 29 January 1139.
d. 1186	Amlaim Ua Muirethaig	Styled "bishop of Ard-Macha and Cenel-Feradhaigh"; appears to be reckoned as Coarb of St Patrick in the Book of Leinster; probably ruled the see of Cinél nEógain; died at Cenél Feradaig Cruthnai, County Londonderry in 1185; buried in Derry

== Pre-Reformation archbishops ==
Pre-Reformation Archbishops of Armagh
From	Until	Ordinary	Notes.
1105	1129	Cellach of Armagh; Saint Cellach; Irish: Cellach mac Áeda meic Máel Ísu	Abbot of Armagh; consecrated bishop on 23 September 1105; elevated to archbishop in 1106; died 1 April 1129; also known as Saint Ceallach, and Celsus.
1129	1132/34	See vacant.	
1132/34	1136/37	Saint Malachy; Irish: Máel Máedóc Ua Morgair	Became bishop of Down and Connor in 1124; elected and consecrated Archbishop of Armagh in 1132, but was not installed until 1134; resigned the sees of Armagh and Connor in 1136 or 1137, but retained Down until his death on 2 November 1148; canonized by Pope Clement III on 6 July 1199; also known as Malachy O'Morgair, Malachy O' More, and Malachias.
1137	1174	Gilla Meic Liac mac Diarmata	Elected and consecrated 1137; died 27 March 1174; also known as Gelasius.
1174	1175	Cornelius of Armagh; Irish: Conchobar mac Meic Con Caille	Elected and consecrated c. 1174; died 1175; also known as St Concors and Cornelius MacConcaille.
1175	1180	Gilla in Choimded Ua Caráin	Translated from Raphoe; elected and consecrated c. 1175; died c. January 1180; also known as Gillebertus, and Gilbert O'Caran.
1180	1184	Tommaltach Ua Conchobair; Irish: Tommaltach mac Áeda Ua Conchobair	Elected and consecrated before February 1180; resigned in 1184; also known as Thomas O'Conor.
1184	1186/87	Mael Ísu Ua Cerbaill	Elected Bishop of Clogher in 1178 and Archbishop of Armagh in 1184; held both sees until his death c. 1186 or 1187; also known as Malachias, and Maelisu O'Carroll.
1186/87	1201	Tommaltach Ua Conchobair (again); Irish: Tommaltach mac Áeda Ua Conchobair	Restored c. 1186 or 1187; died 1201.
1206	1216	Echdonn Mac Gilla Uidir	Elected and consecrated 1202; acted as an auxiliary bishop in the dioceses of Exeter and Worcester 1207; died after 11 August 1216; also known as Eugene MacGillaweer.
1217	1227	Luke Netterville	Elected before August 1217; confirmed in 1220; died 17 April 1227.
1227	1237	Donatus Ó Fidabra	Translated from Clogher c. August 1227; died before 17 October 1237; also known as Donat Fury, and Donat O'Feery.
1238		(Robert Archer OP)	Elected before 4 April 1238, but never consecrated.
1239	1246	Albert Suerbeer OP	Appointed before March 1239; consecrated 30 September 1240; translated to Prussia-Livonia 10 January 1246; also known as Alberic the German.
1247	1256	Reginald of Bologna OP	Appointed and consecrated before 28 October 1247; died July 1256.
1257	1260	Abraham Ó Conalláin	Elected after 20 February 1257; consecrated before 16 March 1258; died 21 December 1260; also known as Abraham O'Connellan.
1261	1270	Máel Patraic Ua Scannail OP (Anglicised: Patrick O'Scanlan)	Elected c. March and confirmed before 13 August 1261; translated from Raphoe 5 November 1261; died 16 March 1270; also known as Patrick O'Scanlan.
1270	1303	Nicol Mac Máel Ísu	Elected after 9 May and confirmed 14 July 1270; died 10 May 1303; also known as Nicholas MacMaelisu.
1303		(Michael MacLochlainn OFM)	Elected before 31 August 1303, but never consecrated; later elected Bishop of Derry in 1319.
1303/04	c.1304	(Dionysius)	Appointed in 1303 or 1304, but was never consecrated; resigned c. 1304.
1306	1307	John Taaffe	Appointed 27 August 1306; died before 6 August 1307.
1307	1311	Walter Jorz OP	Appointed and consecrated 6 August 1307; resigned before 13 November 1311; also known as Walter Joyce.
1311	1322	Roland Jorz OP	Appointed and consecrated 13 November 1311; resigned before 22 August 1322; acted as a auxiliary bishop in the dioceses of Canterbury in 1323, and York in 1332; also known as Roland Joyce.
1323	1333	Stephen Seagrave (alias de Segrave)	Appointed 16 March 1323 and consecrated in April 1324; died 27 October 1333.
1334	1346	David Mág Oireachtaigh	Elected before 4 July 1334 and appointed on that date; consecrated before 26 July 1334; died 16 May 1346; also known in Irish as David Mageraghty.
1346	1360	Richard FitzRalph	Elected before 31 July 1346 and appointed on that date; consecrated 8 July 1347; died 16 November 1360.
1361	1380	Milo Sweetman	Appointed 29 October 1361; consecrated between 17 and 21 November 1361; died 11 August 1380.
1381		(Thomas Ó Calmáin OFM)	Appointed on 14 January 1381 by Avignon Pope Clement VII.
1381	1404	John Colton	Appointed after January 1381; consecrated in 1381; resigned before April 1404; died 27 April 1404.
1404	1416	Nicholas Fleming	Appointed 18 April and consecrated 1 May 1404; appointed (again) 11 November 1404; died after 22 June 1416.
1416	1418	See vacant	During this period, Richard Talbot was elected archbishop of Armagh in 1416, but failed to secure confirmation in time. Later became Archbishop of Dublin in 1417.
1418	1439	John Swayne	Appointed 10 January and consecrated c. 2 February 1418; resigned 27 March 1439; died before October 1442.
1439	1443	John Prene	Appointed 27 March and consecrated in November 1439; died in June 1443.
1443	1456	John Mey	Appointed 26 August 1443 and consecrated 20 June 1444; died in 1456.
1457	1471	John Bole OSA	Appointed 2 May and consecrated before 13 June 1457; died 18 February 1471; also known as John Bull.
1471	1474	John Foxalls OFM	Appointed 16 December 1471 and consecrated later in the same month; died before 23 November 1474; also known as John Foxholes.
1475	1477	Edmund Connesburgh	Appointed 5 June 1475 and consecrated c. 1475, however, did not get possession of the see; resigned November 1477; became titular Archbishop of Chalcedon in 1478; in March 1483 he was styled "Archbishop in the universal church"; he acted as a auxiliary bishop in the dioceses of Ely in 1477, and Exeter in 1502.
1478	1513	Ottaviano Spinelli de Palatio DCL	Appointed 3 July 1478 and consecrated before January 1480; died in June 1513.
1513	1521	John Kite	Appointed 24 October 1513 and consecrated after that date; translated to Carlisle 12 July 1521.

== Archbishops during the Reformation ==
Archbishops of Armagh during the Reformation
From	Until	Ordinary	Notes.
1521	1543	George Cromer [contested]	Appointed by the Pope on 2 October 1521 and consecrated in December 1521 or April 1522. After initially denouncing King Henry VIII's decrees against the Catholic Church, Cromer submitted to Royal supremacy. Suspended by the Pope on 23 July 1539, but continued in office with the support of the king.
1539	1551	Robert Wauchope [contested]	Appointed by the Pope to administer the see on 23 July 1539, but was not recognised by Henry VIII. After Cromer's death, Wauchope was consecrated c. 1543 and granted the pallium on 23 March 1545, but was unable to take control of the see. Died in exile in Paris on 15 August 1551.
1543	1551	George Dowdall (1st term)	Nominated by Henry VIII on 19 April 1543 and consecrated December 1543. Deemed to have abandoned the See before 28 July 1551.
1552	1553	Hugh Goodacre	Nominated by King Edward VI on 28 October 1552 and consecrated on 2 February 1553. Died on 1 May 1553.
1553	1558	George Dowdall (2nd term)	Appointed by the Pope on 1 March 1553 and granted the temporalities by Queen Mary I on 23 October 1553. Died on 15 August 1558.

== Post-Reformation archbishops ==
=== Church of Ireland succession ===
Church of Ireland Archbishops of Armagh
From	Until	Ordinary	Notes.
1558	1562	See vacant.	
1562	1567	Adam Loftus	Nominated 30 October 1562; consecrated 2 March 1563; Translated to Dublin 9 August 1567; died 5 April 1605.
1568	1584	Thomas Lancaster	Formerly Bishop of Kildare (1550–1555); nominated 12 March 1568; consecrated 13 June 1568; died 1584.
1584	1589	John Longe	Nominated 7 July 1584; consecrated 13 July 1584; died before 16 January 1589.
1589	1595	John Garvey	Translated from Kilmore; nominated 24 March 1589; by letters patent 10 May 1589; died 2 March 1595.
1595	1613	Henry Ussher	Nominated 24 May 1595; consecrated August 1595; also Archdeacon of Dublin 1580–1613; died 2 April 1613.
1613	1625	Christopher Hampton	Nominated 16 April 1613; consecrated 8 May 1613; died 3 January 1625.
1625	1656	James Ussher	Translated from Meath; nominated 29 January 1625; by letters patent 21 March 1625; also Bishop of Carlisle 1641–1656; died 21 March 1656.
1656	1661	See vacant.	
1661	1663	John Bramhall	Translated from Derry; nominated 1 August 1660; letters patent 18 January 1661; died 25 June 1663.
1663	1678	James Margetson	Translated from Dublin; nominated 25 July 1663, by letters patent 20 August 1663; died 28 August 1678.
1679	1702	Michael Boyle	Translated from Dublin; nominated 21 January 1679; by letters patent 27 February 1679; died 10 December 1702.
1703	1713	Narcissus Marsh	Translated from Dublin; nominated 26 January 1703; by letters patent 18 February 1703; died 2 November 1713.
1713	1724	Thomas Lindsay	Translated from Raphoe; nominated 22 December 1713; by letters patent 4 January 1714; died 13 July 1724.
1724	1742	Hugh Boulter	Translated from Bristol; nominated 12 August 1724; by letters patent 31 August 1724; died 27 September 1742.
1742	1746	John Hoadly	Translated from Dublin; nominated 6 October 1742; by letters patent 21 October 1742; died 16 July 1746.
1747	1764	George Stone	Translated from Derry; nominated 28 February 1747; by letters patent 13 March 1747; died 19 December 1764.
1765	1794	Richard Robinson	The Lord Rokeby from 1777. Translated from Kildare; nominated 8 January 1765; by letters patent 8 February 1765; died 10 October 1794.
1795	1800	William Newcome	Translated from Waterford and Lismore; nominated 16 January 1795; by letters patent 27 January 1795; died 11 January 1800.
1800	1822	The Hon William Stuart	Translated from St David's; nominated 30 October 1800; by letters patent 22 November 1800; died 6 May 1822.
1822	1862	Lord John Beresford	Translated from Dublin; nominated and by letters patent 17 June 1822; died 18 July 1862; first-cousin-once-removed to Marcus.
1862	1885	Marcus Beresford	Translated from Kilmore, Elphin and Ardagh; by letters patent 15 October 1862; died 26 December 1885; first-cousin-once-removed to John.
1886	1893	Robert Knox	Translated from Down, Connor and Dromore; elected 11 May 1886; died 23 October 1893.
1893	1896	Robert Gregg	Translated from Cork, Cloyne and Ross; elected 14 December 1893; died 10 January 1896.
1896	1911	William Alexander	Translated from Derry and Raphoe; elected 25 February 1896; resigned 1 February 1911; died 12 September 1911.
1911	1920	John Crozier	Translated from Down, Connor and Dromore; elected 2 February 1911; died 11 April 1920.
1920	1938	Charles D'Arcy	Translated from Dublin; elected 17 June 1920; died 1 February 1938.
1938	1938	Godfrey Day	Translated from Ossory, Ferns and Leighlin; 27 April 1938; died 26 September 1938.
1939	res. 1959	John Gregg	Translated from Dublin; elected 15 December 1938; accepted 1 January 1939; resigned 18 February 1959; died 1961.
1959	res. 1969	James McCann	Translated from Meath; elected 19 February 1959; resigned 16 July 1969.
1969	res. 1980	George Simms	Translated from Dublin; elected 17 July 1969; resigned 11 February 1980; died 1991.
1980	res. 1986	John Armstrong	Translated from Cashel and Ossory; elected 25 February 1980; resigned 1986; died 1987.
1986	res. 2006	Robin Eames	Translated from Down and Dromore; retired; created Baron Eames on 25 August 1995.
2007	res. 2012	Alan Harper	Translated from Connor; elected 9 January 2007; enthroned 16 March 2007; retired 1 October 2012.
2012	res. 2020	Richard Clarke	Translated from Meath and Kildare; elected 3 October 2012; enthroned 12 December 2012; retired 2 February 2020.
2020	present	John McDowell	Translated from Clogher; elected 18 March 2020.

=== Catholic succession ===
Catholic Archbishops of Armagh
From	Until	Ordinary	Notes.
1558	1560	See vacant.	
1560	1562	Donagh O'Tighe	Appointed 7 February 1560; consecrated February 1560; died 1562; also known as Donat O'Teige.
1562	1564	See vacant.	
1564	1585	Richard Creagh	Appointed 22 March 1564; consecrated Easter 1564; died as a prisoner in the Tower of London in January 1585.
1585	1587	See vacant.	
1587	1593	Edmund MacGauran	Translated from Ardagh; appointed 1 July 1587; died 23 June 1593.
1593	1601	See vacant.	
1601	1625	Peter Lombard	Appointed 9 July 1601; he never came to Ireland, but remained in Rome; died 1625.
1626		Aodh Mac Cathmhaoil OFM (Anglicised: Hugh MacCaghwell)	Appointed 27 April 1626; consecrated 7 June 1626; died 22 September 1626.
1626	1628	See vacant.	
1628	1653	Hugh O'Reilly	Translated from Kilmore; appointed by three consistorial acts: dated 5 May, 31 July, and 31 August 1628; died in February 1653.
1653	1658	See vacant.	
1658	1669	Edmund O'Reilly	Appointed 16 April 1658; consecrated 26 May 1658; died 8 March 1669.
1669	1681	Saint Oliver Plunkett	Appointed 9 July 1669; papal brief 3 August 1669; consecrated 1 December 1669; executed 1 July 1681; canonized 12 October 1975.
1681	unknown	(Edward Drumgoole, vicar apostolic)	Appointed vicar apostolic by papal brief on 19 December 1681.
1683	1707	Dominic Maguire OP	Appointed 14 December 1683; papal brief 12 January 1684; died 21 September 1707.
1707	1715	See vacant.	
1715	1737	Hugh MacMahon	Translated from Clogher; appointed 6 August 1715; papal brief 9 July 1715; also was apostolic administrator of Dromore 1731–37; died 2 August 1737.
1737	1747	Bernard MacMahon	Translated from Clogher; appointed 8 November 1737; also was apostolic administrator of Dromore 1737–47; died 27 May 1747.
1747	1748	Ross MacMahon	Translated from Clogher 3 August 1747; died 29 October 1748.
1749	1758	Michael O'Reilly	Translated from Derry; appointed 23 January 1749; died 1758.
1758	1787	Anthony Blake	Translated from Ardagh and Clonmacnoise; appointed 21 August 1758; died 11 November 1787.
1787	1818	Richard O'Reilly	Appointed coadjutor archbishop 26 February 1782; succeeded 11 November 1787; died 31 January 1818.
1819	1832	Patrick Curtis	Appointed 8 August 1819; consecrated 28 October 1819; died 26 July 1832.
1832	1835	Thomas Kelly	Translated from Dromore; appointed coadjutor archbishop 1 December 1828; succeeded 26 July 1832; died 13 January 1835.
1835	1849	William Crolly	Translated from Down and Connor; appointed 12 April 1835; died 6 April 1849.
1849	1852	Paul Cullen	Appointed 19 December 1849; consecrated 24 February 1850; translated to Dublin 1 May 1852, where he subsequently became the first Irish cardinal on 22 June 1866.
1852	1866	Joseph Dixon	Appointed 4 October 1852; consecrated 21 November 1852; died 29 April 1866.
1866	1869	Michael Kieran	Appointed 6 November 1866; consecrated 3 February 1867; died 15 September 1869.
1870	1887	Daniel McGettigan	Translated from Raphoe; appointed 11 March 1870; died 3 December 1887.
1887	1924	Cardinal Michael Logue	Translated from Raphoe; appointed coadjutor archbishop 30 April 1887; succeeded 3 December 1887; created cardinal 19 January 1893; died 19 November 1924.
1924	1927	Cardinal Patrick O'Donnell	Translated from Raphoe; appointed coadjutor archbishop 14 February 1922; succeeded 19 November 1924; created cardinal 14 December 1925; died 22 October 1927.
1928	1945	Cardinal Joseph MacRory	Translated from Down and Connor; appointed 22 June 1928; created cardinal 16 December 1929; died 13 October 1945.
1946	1963	Cardinal John D'Alton	Translated from Meath; appointed 25 April 1946; created cardinal 12 January 1953; died 1 February 1963.
1963	1977	Cardinal William Conway	Formerly an auxiliary bishop of Armagh 1958–1963; appointed archbishop 9 September 1963; created cardinal 22 February 1965; died 17 April 1977.
1977	1990	Cardinal Tomás Ó Fiaich	Appointed 22 August 1977; consecrated 2 October 1977; created cardinal 30 June 1979; died 8 May 1990.
1990	1996	Cardinal Cahal Daly	Translated from Down and Connor; appointed 6 November 1990; created cardinal 28 June 1991; retired 1 October 1996; died 31 December 2009.
1996	2014	Cardinal Seán Brady	Appointed coadjutor archbishop 13 December 1994 and consecrated 19 February 1995; succeeded as archbishop 1 October and installed 3 November 1996; created cardinal 24 November 2007 and resignation as archbishop accepted 8 September 2014
2014	present	Eamon Martin	Appointed coadjutor archbishop 18 January 2013 and consecrated 21 April 2013; succeeded as archbishop 8 September 2014

== See also ==
- Irish Catholic Bishops' Conference
- Book of Armagh
- Bachal Isu
