= Senach =

Irish Bishop

Saint Senach (also called Seanach, Seanoir, Senóir, Senior; c. 550 – 11 April 610) was the Bishop of Armagh, Ireland from 598 to 610.

== Genealogy and birth ==
Saint Senach was a member of the Ui Nialláin clan, who were the rulers of the present baronies of Oneilland West and Oneilland East, County Armagh, Ireland. The patriarch of the clan was Nialláin m. Féicc m. Feidelmid m. Fiachrach Cassáin m. Collai Fochríth, who lived about 370 AD, and Senach would have been in about the 7th generation of descent from him. His father was Maeldalua. Senach was born c. 550 in Cluain hui meicc Gricci (the meadow of the descendants of Grici) which was in the parish of Kilmore, Barony of Oneilland West and County of Armagh.

== Education ==
Senach was nicknamed the "Rough Smith" so he may have been a metalworker in a monastery.

== Bishop of Armagh ==
On the death of Eochu macDiarmaid, the Bishop of Armagh, in January 598, Senach was appointed as the 14th coarb in succession to Saint Patrick. The Annals of the Four Masters for 457 AD state "Ard Mhacha was founded by Saint Patrick, it having been granted to him by Daire, son of Finnchadh, son of Eoghan, son of Niallan." So Senach’s appointment was probably due to the influence of his family as the original grantors of the land and several Bishops of Armagh came from this same family. Senach reigned as Bishop for 12 years. Thomas Walsh states, without giving the specific source, that "Senach is mentioned by several annalists as a learned man, and is said to have written valuable tracts on the Scriptures and the works of the Fathers, which are now lost."

== Death ==
St. Senach died on 11 April 610 AD. The Annals of Ireland give the following obituaries:

- Annals of the Four Masters 609 – "Seanach, Abbot of Ard-Macha, died; he was of Cluain-Ua-nGrici."
- Annals of Ulster 610 – "Senach from Cluain Uaingrighe, abbot of Ard Macha, rested."

== Feast day ==
After his death Senach was venerated as a saint and his feast was celebrated on 11 April, the day of his death. The Calendars of the Saints have the following entries:

- Martyrology of Gorman 11 April – "Senóir, son of Mael da-Lua, primate of Armagh."
- Martyrology of Oengus 11 April – "The archbishop of Ireland, i.e. Senóir son of Máel da lua on the 11th of April rested in peace, ut quidam dixit:

"Son of Máel da-lua, of the industrious study, his death to Ireland is terrible;
"in guerdon of his just deeds from long ago he found heaven on the eleventh of April."

- Martyrology of Tallaght 11 April – "Senior mac Maeldalua"
- Bollandists Acta Sanctorum, Tomus II, Aprilis xi. Among the pretermitted saints, p. 2. –

"Senior, the son of Moeldavan, and Primate of Armagh"

- Martyrology of Donegal 11 April – "Senoir, son of Maeldalua, primate of Ard Macha."

== Battle of Moira ==
The Battle of Moira was fought in 637 AD and in an old text called "The Battle of Magh Rath", Senach appears in the following account of the wounding of Cenn Fáelad mac Ailella:

Now the robust, sanguine, rapid-wounding hero, and the lively, sure-striking bear, Congal Claen, went forth, and was met by Cennfaeladh, the son of Oilell, to whom he gave a mighty, hard-smiting stroke of his sword, so that he broke the helmet and cut the head under it, so that a portion of the brain flowed out, and Cennfaeladh would have fallen by Congal on the spot, had he not been protected by Crunnmael, the son of Suibhne, and Maelodhar Macha; and after protecting him they conveyed him to Senach, Comharba of St.Patrick and returned to maintain their part of the battle. After this Senach conducted Cenn Faeladh to Bricin of Tuaim Dreagan.

However, this is a late anachronism as Senach died in 610, which was 27 years before the battle. The Bishop of Armagh at the time of the battle of Moira was Tómméne.
