= Eulalius =

Eulalius may refer to:

- Ailill the First (460–526), Irish archbishop
- Antipope Eulalius (died 423), antipope and bishop of Napete
