= Saint Cormac =

Saint Cormac may refer to:

- Cormac of Armagh (c. 430– 497), Bishop of Armagh and Abbot of Armagh monastery, Ireland from 481 to 497
- Cormac mac Cuilennáin (died 908), Irish bishop and the king of Munster from 902 until his death at the Battle of Bellaghmoon
