= Eochu macDiarmaid =

Irish Catholic bishop (c. 540-598)

Eochu macDiarmaid (also called Eochu; c. 540 – January 598), was the Bishop of Armagh, Ireland from 588 to 598.

== Genealogy and birth ==
Eochu was born c. 540 AD in Domnach Rigdruing (The Church of the King's tribe). His father was Diarmait.

== Bishop of Armagh ==
On the death of Carláen, the Bishop of Armagh, on 24 March 588, Eochu was appointed as the 13th coarb in succession to Saint Patrick. Eochu reigned as Bishop for 10 years. He probably attended the Synod of Drumceat in 590 in his capacity as bishop of Armagh.

Eochu is referred to as a witness to a contract guaranteeing the rights of the Airgialla clan, as follows- "Who binds the witnesses of the contract, it is not a cause of subjection, Bishop Echu, Bishop Aed mac Bric, Senach son of Máel".

== Death ==
Eochu died in January 598. The Annals of Ireland give the following obits-

- Annals of the Four Masters 597- "Eochaidh, son of Diarmaid, Bishop and Abbot of Ard-Macha, died"
- Annals of Ulster 598- "Eochu, abbot of Ard Macha, rested"
- Annals from the Book of Leinster- Eochu, abbot of Armagh
