= Fer dá Chrích mac Suibni =

Saint Fer dá Chrích mac Suibni (also called Feardachrich, Feradach, Ferdachricus, Fer dá Crích, Ferdacrioch, ffear-Dachrich, Firdacrich; c. 710 – 18 May 768) was the Abbot of Armagh, Ireland from 758 to 18 May 768.

== Genealogy and birth ==
Fer dá Chrích was the son of Saint Suibne, Bishop of Armagh, son of Crundmael, son of Rónán of the Úi Nialláin clan from Oneilland Barony, County Armagh.

His genealogy is "Fer dá Chrích meicc Suibne meicc Crundmael meic Ronain meic Baetain meic Muiredaich meic Eogain meic Niallain meic Feicc meic Feidelmid meic Fiachrach Cassan m. Colla Fochrích".

Fer dá Chrích's brother was Rónáin mac Suibni from whom the Clan Cernaig descend as follows-"Cummascach m. Cernaig m. Máilchíaráin m. Eochach m. Cernaig m. Echach m. Cumascaig m. Ailella m. Cumascaig m. Cernaig m. Suibne m. Éicnig m. Colcan m. Suibne m. Rónaín m Suibne".

== Abbot of Armagh ==
On the death of Célé Petair, Abbot of Armagh, in 758, Fer dá Chrích was appointed as the 22nd coarb in succession to Saint Patrick. Fer dá Chrích reigned as Abbot for 10 years.

== Battle of Emain Macha ==
In 759 Dúngal mac Amalgado, King of Brega, fought the Battle of Emain Macha against Fiachnae mac Áedo Róin, King of Ulaid. Dúngal was defeated and slain along with his ally Donn Bó mac Con Brettan, king of Fir Rois. The cause of the battle was a feud within the abbacy of Armagh. Dúngal took the side of a priest named Airechtach versus the abbot Fer-dá-Chrích who was supported by Fiachnae.

The Annals of Tigernach for 759 state- "The battle of Emain Macha between the Ulaid and the Uí Néill, with Airechtach the priest of Armagh pushing in discord with the abbot of Fer da Crich, where Dungal grandson of Conaing and Donn Bó were killed. Fiachna son of Aodh Róin was victor".

== Death ==
Fer dá Chrích died on 18 May 768. The Annals of Ireland give the following obits-

- Annals of Clonmacnoise 761- "ffear-Dachrich, abbot of Ardmach, Died"
- Annals of Inisfallen 768- "Repose of Feradach son of Suibne, abbot of Ard Macha"
- Annals of Ulster 768- "Fer dá Crích son of Suibne, abbot of Ard Macha, rested"
- Annals of Roscrea 768- "Quies Fir da Crich abbatis Ard Machae"
- Annals of the Four Masters 771- "Feardachrich, Abbot of Ard-Macha, the son of Suibhne, son of Ronan, son of Crunnmael, died"
- Annals from the Book of Leinster- "Fer dá Chrích, abbot of Armagh"

== Feast Day ==
After his death Fer dá Chrích was venerated as a saint and his feast was celebrated on 18 May, the day of his death. The Calendars of the Saints have the following entries:

- Martyrology of Gorman 18 May- "Fer dá Chrích"
- Martyrology of Tallaght 18 May- "Firdacrich"
- Martyrology of Donegal 18 May- "Ferdacrioch"
- Bollandists Acta Sanctorum, tomus iv, among the pretermitted saints. p. 135, 18 May- "Ferdachricus, son of Subnei, son to Ronan"
