= Dubthach the First =

Dubthach the First (also called Dubhthach, Dubtach, Dubtagh, Duach the Elder, Duach I, Dúach, Duffy, Doachus; c. 450 - 513) was the Bishop of Armagh, Ireland from 497 to 513.

== Genealogy and birth ==
Dubthach was from Druim-Dearbh (probably Derver, County Louth).

== Bishop of Armagh ==
On the death of Saint Cormac of Armagh, the Bishop of Armagh, on 17 February 497, Dubthach was appointed as the 6th coarb in succession to Saint Patrick. Dubthach reigned as bishop for 16 years. Thomas Walsh, without giving the specific source, states that-

"The scanty fragments of Irish history, which have escaped the wreck of English persecution during the 16th and 17th centuries, give us to understand, that this primate made the life and actions of St. Patrick his constant model, while he governed for sixteen years the see of Armagh. He took care to have churches erected on the northern and western coasts, which, until his time, were unconverted: others he enlarged and adorned. Young and active, as well as holy men were always ready to go forth and instruct the people. He watched over the education and morals of the people, and devoted much time to the establishment and superintendence of schools, particularly the celebrated one of Armagh."

== St. Tigernach ==
In the Life of St. Tigernach of Clones there is an anecdote about Dubhthach-

‘The fame of our Saint's virtues being diffused abroad, many holy men flocked to visit him, and to engage in useful and pious conferences. Among others, Duach (Doachus), Bishop of Armagh, was received with great honour and attention, by the saint. At his departure, Tigemach offered up earnest prayers to God. While travelling through a plain, called Magh Glas (or Machaire Glas or Glassen) the Bishop departed this life, a circumstance which was revealed to our saint. He ordered a charioteer, to put horses under his chariot. Having ascended it, the driver was desired not to open his eyes, without a special permission. Tigernach declared, likewise, that he would hold the reins, on that day; for, he knew, that the Angels should accompany them, on the way. The event corresponded with his anticipations. Having journeyed a considerable distance, the charioteer ventured to uncover his head, contrary to the Bishop's advice, but not with impunity. He was instantly deprived of sight. However, this was again restored, on his master signing him with a cross. When they came to that place, where the Bishop's corpse lay, blessing holy water, Tigernach sprinkled it on the body. Then, earnestly addressing his prayers to God, our saint requested the return of the Bishop's soul to his body. Immediately, Duach arose, and then he said, "Tigernach on earth, Tigernach in heaven" as if he would say, that whilst our Saint's body remained on earth, his soul and dwelling were in Heaven. Afterwards, both these servants of God, receiving from each other a kiss of peace, conceived most tender sentiments of mutual and fraternal love.’

Scholars like Charles Plummer and Kim McCone assumed this refers to Dubthach the Second but the position of the anecdote in Tigernach’s Life means it is more likely to refer to Dubthach the First, a view that Ware and Canon O’Hanlon agreed with.

== Death ==
Dubthach died in 513. The Annals of Ireland give the following obits-

- Annals of the Four Masters 512- "Dubhthach, i.e. of Druim-Dearbh, Bishop of Ard-Macha, resigned his spirit"
- Annals of Inisfallen 512- "Repose of Dubthach, bishop of Ard Macha"
- Annals of Ulster 513- "Dubthach from Druim Derb, bishop of Ard Macha, died"
- Chronicon Scotorum 513- "Dubtach, Abbot of Ardmacha, quievit"
- Annals of Tigernach 515- "Dubthach of Armagh died"
- Annals of Clonmacnoise 516- "Duffagh abbott of Ardmach dyed"
- Annals from the Book of Leinster- "Dubthach, abbot of Armagh, rested"

== Feast day ==
It seems that Dubhthach was not venerated as a saint as record exists of his veneration or of his Feast Day.
