= Congus =

Bishop of Armagh, Ireland from 730 to 750

- Born: c. 680
- Died: 750
- Occupations: Archbishop of Armagh, Ireland from 730–750

Congus (also called Congas, Conghas, Conghus; c. 680 – 750) was the Bishop of Armagh, Ireland from 730 to 750.

== Genealogy and birth ==
Congus was from Cul Athguirt in the parish of Islandmagee, County Antrim. He was descended from Dá Slúaig, the son of Ainmere so he was a member of the Húi Nadsluaga clan who were one of the five prímthúatha of Dál mBuinne, east of Lough Neagh, County Antrim. Congus was a scribe before being elevated to the See of Armagh.

== Bishop of Armagh ==
On the death of Saint Suibne, the Bishop of Armagh, on 21 June 730, Congus was appointed as the 20th coarb in succession to Saint Patrick. Congus reigned as Bishop for 20 years.

== Supremacy of Armagh ==
The primacy and influence of Armagh expanded greatly during the rule of Congus. This was mainly due to his influence over two successive High Kings of Ireland, Áed Allán whose spiritual confessor he was and Flaithbertach mac Loingsig whose bishop-abbot he was.

Before the reign of Congus the primates generally restricted themselves to the see of Armagh but afterwards they began to make circuits and visitations through the rest of Ireland for the collection of their dues. This was called the Cattlecess or "Law of St. Patrick".

Geoffrey Keating states- "It was about this time that a meeting took place between Aodh Ollan, king of Ireland, and Cathal, son of Fionghaine, king of Munster, at Tir Daghlas, in Urmhumha, where they imposed Patrick's rule and law and tribute on Ireland"

The Annals of Ulster have the following entries under the year 737-

"A meeting between Aed Allán and Cathal at Tír dá Glas. The law of Patrick was in force in Ireland"

A further impetus to the widening influence of Armagh was that the High King of Ireland Flaithbertach mac Loingsig of the Cenél Conaill abdicated his throne in 734 and went to reside in Armagh monastery for the rest of his life

== Battle of Fochart ==
The Battle of Fochart in 732 is alleged to have taken place between Áed Róin, king of Ulaid, and Áed Allán, High King of Ireland, as a result of a quatrain composed by Congus whilst bishop. It resulted in a devastating defeat for the Ulaid, to which Congus belonged, and resulted in the death of Áed Róin. An Irish proverb arose from this incident- "Torad penne Congusa" (the fruit of Congus's pen), i.e. the downfall of the Ulaid resulted from the letter of Congus.

== Death ==
Congus died in 750. The Annals of Ireland give the following obits-

- Annals of the Four Masters 749- "Congus, the scribe, Bishop of Ard-Macha, died; he was of the race of Ainmire"
- Annals of Inisfallen 750- "Repose of Congus, abbot of ArdMacha"
- Annals of Ulster 750- "Repose of Congus, bishop of ArdMacha"
- Annals of Tigernach 750- "The rest of Congus, bishop of Armagh"
