= Saint Suibne =

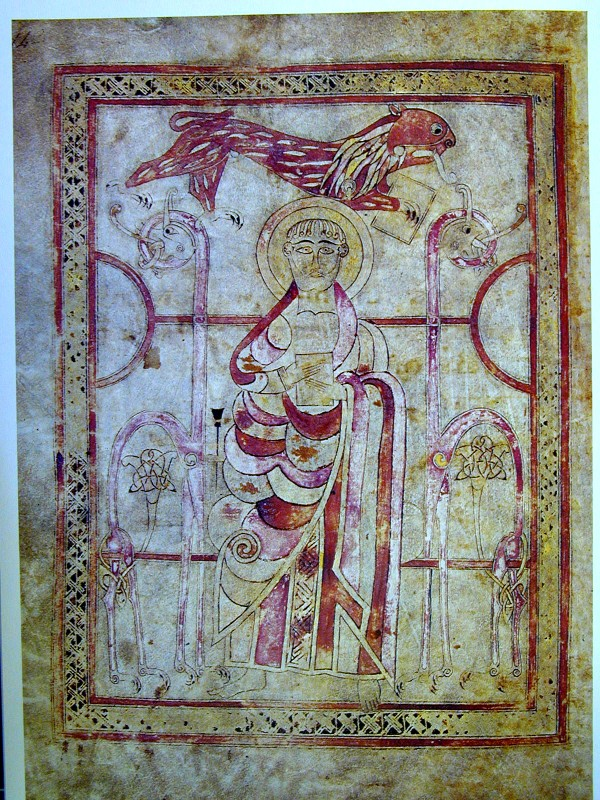
Saint Suibne depicted in the Lichfield Gospels, published 730 A.D.

Saint Suibne (also called Subne, Suibhne, Suibhney, Suibne nepos Mruichessaich, Suibne nepos mac Crundmaíl, Subnei, Suibni, Suivney, Sweeney; c. 670 – 21 June 730) was the Bishop of Armagh, Ireland from 715 to 21 June 730. He is notable for his portrait which is possibly the earliest contemporary representation of a bishop of Armagh.

== Genealogy and birth ==
Suibne was from Cobran and was the son of Crundmael, son of Rónán of the Úi Nialláin clan from Oneilland Barony, County Armagh. He was called Suibne the Sage.

His genealogy is "Suibne meicc Crundmael meic Ronain meic Baetain meic Muiredaich meic Eogain meic Niallain meic Feicc meic Feidelmid meic Fiachrach Cassan m. Colla Fochrích".

== Bishop of Armagh ==
On the death of Saint Fland Feblae mac Scandláin, the Bishop of Armagh, on 24 April 715, Suibne was appointed as the 19th Bishop in succession to Saint Patrick. Suibne reigned as Bishop for 15 years. Four years into his reign Armagh was attacked and some of the monks were killed. The Annals of Ulster under the year 719 state- "The killing of the community of Suibne in Ard Macha".

== Lichfield gospels ==
There is an illustration on page 142 of the Lichfield Gospels made about 730 which depicts a prelate whom some scholars identify as Saint Suibne. If correct then it is the earliest contemporary portrait of a bishop of Armagh.

== Death ==
Suibne died on 21 June 730. The Annals of Ireland give the following obits-

- Annals of the Four Masters 729- "Suibhne, son of Cronnmael, son of Ronan, Bishop of Ard-Macha, died on the 21st of June; he was of the Ui-Niallain"
- Annals of Inisfallen 729- "Repose of Suibne, abbot of Ard Macha"
- Annals of Ulster 730- "Suibne alias son of Crunnmael, descendant of Mruichesach, bishop of Ard Macha, fell asleep"
- Fragmentary Annals of Ireland 730- "Suibne, abbot of Ard Macha, rested"
- Annals from the Book of Leinster- "Subne, abbot of Armagh, dies"

== Feast day ==
After his death Suibne was venerated as a saint and his feast was celebrated on 21 June, the day of his death. The Calendars of the Saints have the following entries-

- Martyrology of Gorman 21 June- "Hostful Suibne, bishop of Armagh"
- Martyrology of Oengus 21 June- "Bishop Suibne here"
- Martyrology of Tallaght 21 June- "Suibne Eps. O Chobran"
- Martyrology of Donegal 21 June- "Suibhne, Bishop, of Ard-Macha, A.D. 729"

== Descendants ==
According to the genealogies Suibne left at least two sons, Rónáin and Fer Dá Chrích, but whether he was married or not is unknown. His son Saint Fer dá Chrích mac Suibni later became the Abbot of Armagh, reigning from 758 to 768. The Clan Cernaig descend from his other son Rónáin as follows-"Cummascach m. Cernaig m. Máilchíaráin m. Eochach m. Cernaig m. Echach m. Cumascaig m. Ailella m. Cumascaig m. Cernaig m. Suibne m. Éicnig m. Colcan m. Suibne m. Rónaín m Suibne".
