= Carláen =

Irish bishop and saint

Saint Carláen (also called Cairlan, Carlan, Cairellán, Caurlan, Caerlan, Cáerlan, Cairlaene, Carillan, Cairlén, Ciarlaech, Cayrlan, Cairlani; c. 530 – 24 March 588) was the Bishop of Armagh, Ireland, from 578 to 588.

== Genealogy and birth ==
Saint Carláen was a member of the Ui Nialláin clan who were the rulers of the present baronies of Oneilland West and Oneilland East, County Armagh, Ireland. The patriarch of the clan was Nialláin m. Féicc m. Feidelmid m. Fiachrach Cassáin m. Collai Fochríth, who lived about 370 AD, and Carláen would have been in about the 6th generation of descent from him. Carláen was born c. 530 in a place called Domnach maccu Garba (Church of the tribe of Garba), in Oneilland. This placename is not now known but perhaps may be hidden in the present Oneilland townland names of Donagreagh or Garvaghy.

== Education ==
Carláen would have been a member of the nobility in Armagh and would have received the best education possible at the time. He was presumably a younger son as he was destined for the church rather than succeeding to the family estate.

== Abbot of the Monastery of St. Carláen ==
After his ordination as a priest St. Carláen founded a monastery in Oneilland, probably on land owned by his family. The earliest incident we know in his life happened while he was abbot there. According to the Life of Saint Daig of Iniskeen, County Monaghan- "Saint Daig went to the monastery of St. Cayrlan, who happened to have died that very night. However, Daigh restored him to life, for which reason, Cayrlan placed himself and his monastery under the rule of St. Daig"

== Bishop of Armagh ==
On the death of Fedelmid Find, the Bishop of Armagh on 30 October 578, Carláen was appointed as the 12th Bishop in succession to Saint Patrick. The Annals of the Four Masters for 457 AD state- "Ard Mhacha was founded by Saint Patrick, it having been granted to him by Daire, son of Finnchadh, son of Eoghan, son of Niallan." So Carláen's appointment was probably due to the influence of his family as the original grantors of the land and several Bishops of Armagh came from this same family. Carláen reigned as Bishop for a decade.

== Death ==
St. Carláen died on 24 March 588. The Annals of Ireland give the following obits-

- Annals of Tigernach 586.1- "The rest of Carillan bishop of Armagh"
- Annals of the Four Masters 587- "St. Caerlan, Bishop of Ard-Macha, died on the twenty-fourth day of March"
- Annals of Clonmacnoise 587- "Carlan Bishop of Ardmach dyed."
- Annals of Roscrea 587- "Quies Cairlain epscoip Aird Macha"
- Annals of Ulster 588.1- "Repose of Cairlén, bishop of Ard Macha—the bishop of Ard Macha, i.e. Ciarlaech from the territory of the Uí Nialláin."

== Feast day ==
After his death Carláen was venerated as a saint and his feast was celebrated on 24 March, the day of his death. The Calendars of the Saints have the following entries-

- Martyrology of Gorman 24 March- "Cairlan escop Arda Macha"
- Martyrology of Donegal 24 March- "Caorlan, Bishop, of Ard Macha, AD. 587"
- Martyrology of Tallaght 24 March- "Cairlon, Bishop"
- Bollandists "Acta Sanctorum," tomus iii., Martii xxiv. Among the pretermitted saints, p. 473.

However what is probably a duplicate entry is listed under 23 March by both the Martyrology of Tallaght "Cairlaini" and the Bollandists.
