= Cornelius of Armagh =

Irish archbishop

Saint Cornelius

Archbishop of Armagh
- Born: Ireland
- Died: 1175; Chambéry, Savoy, France
- Venerated in: Roman Catholic Church
- Feast: 4 June

Cornelius also known as Conchobar mac Meic Con Caille (Anglicised spelling: 'Conor/Connor; Modern Irish: Conor Mac Conchailleach; died 1175) was Archbishop of Armagh. An Irishman by birth, he entered the Augustinians at Armagh in 1140, before being made abbot in 1151. Later in 1174, Cornelius was consecrated bishop. Cornelius died on his return from a pilgrimage from Rome in Chambéry, Savoy, France, in 1175.

In 1854 Rev. Joseph Dixon, Archbishop of Armagh, returning from a trip to Rome, stopped by the shrine in Chambéry and obtained some relics of St. Cornelius/Concord. He gave a portion of the rib bone to the Presentation Convent in Drogheda and a portion of the thigh bone to the Sacred Heart Convent in Armagh.
