= Tómméne =

Bishop of Armagh, Ireland

Saint Tómméne (also called Thoman, Thomanus, Thomenus, Thomian, Thomianus, Thomienus, Toimen, Toimene, Tóiméne, Tomiano, Tómíne, Tomini, Tomméin, Tommene, Tommine, Tomyn, Comméne, Comyn, Terenannus; c. 580 – 10 January 661) was the Bishop of Armagh, Ireland from 623 to 10 January 661.

== Genealogy and birth ==
St. Tómméne was probably a member of a tribe from North-East Ulster as was usual for Bishops of Armagh at this time. His father was Ronan. His genealogy does not appear to have survived but John Colgan stated he was the son of a chief, so it is probable his father was the ‘Ronan, son of Tuathal, Lord of the Airtheara’, who died in 620 according to the Annals of the Four Masters (AU 625, CS 625, AI 626). The Airtheara were an Airgialla tribe who ruled the district of Armagh. In which case his genealogy would be "Tómméne m Ronain m Tuathail m Oilella m Conaill m Feig m Bresail m Felim m Fiachra casan m Colla fo crith" According to Colgan- Tómméne grew up in great virtue, and from early youth he was remarkable for attention to study. Afterwards he was ranked among the most erudite of his countrymen, during an age most fruitful in the production of learned men.

== Bishop of Armagh ==
On the death of Saint Mac Laisre, the Bishop of Armagh, on 12 September 623, St. Tómméne was appointed as the 16th coarb in succession to Saint Patrick. Saint Tómméne reigned as Bishop for 38 years.

== Paschal Controversies ==
At this time the Irish Church was preoccupied with the Paschal Question, i.e. how to compute the date of Easter and Christ's death. St. Tómméne was interested in this dispute even before he was made Bishop of Armagh. A letter, written c. 610 by Archbishop Laurence of Canterbury and countersigned by Mellitus, the Bishop of London and Justus, Bishop of Rochester, was sent to the Irish bishops urging them to adopt the Roman method of calculating Easter. According to John of Tinmouth and Capgrave (who mistakenly refer to Tómméne as Terenannus rather than Thomianus), Tómméne heard St. Laurence speaking on the matter and- "He thus laid hold of the truth, and afterwards took a great deal of pains, referable to those matters, in reforming his own people". The southern part of Ireland accepted the Vatican computation at the Synod of Magh Lene in 630 A.D. However the Northern clergy were followers of the method proposed by Iona and its affiliate churches, known as the Irish Computation. In order to settle the matter Tómméne, with some other Ulster bishops and clergy, sent a letter in the first half of 640 to Pope Severinus setting out both sides of the argument and requesting his advice. However Pope Severinus died on 2 August 640 without having opened the letter. The future Pope John IV and others in the Vatican hierarchy replied to the letter sometime between August and Christmas 640, beginning as follows- ""Our most beloved and most holy Thomian, Columbanus, Croman, Diman, and Baithan bishops—to Croman, Hernian, Laistran, Scellan, and Segenus, presbyters—to Saran, and the rest of the Irish doctors or abbots." The Vatican was worried that the doctrine of Pelagianism was taking root in Ireland and advised against it in this letter.

== Battle of Moira ==
The Battle of Moira was fought in 637 AD and in an old text called "The Battle of Magh Rath", the following account of the wounding of Cenn Fáelad mac Ailella appears-

"Now the robust, sanguine, rapid-wounding hero, and the lively, sure-striking bear, Congal Claen, went forth, and was met by Cennfaeladh, the son of Oilell, to whom he gave a mighty, hard-smiting stroke of his sword, so that he broke the helmet and cut the head under it, so that a portion of the brain flowed out, and Cennfaeladh would have fallen by Congal on the spot, had he not been protected by Crunnmael, the son of Suibhne, and Maelodhar Macha; and after protecting him they conveyed him to Senach, Comharba of St.Patrick and returned to maintain their part of the battle. After this Senach conducted Cenn Faeladh to Bricin of Tuaim Dreagan"

However the name of bishop Senach is a late anachronism as he died in 610 which was 27 years before the battle. The Bishop of Armagh at the time of the battle of Moira was Tómméne and it was he who was involved in the above incident.

== Death ==
St. Tómméne died on 10 January 661. The Annals of Ireland give the following obits-

- Annals of Clonmacnoise 657- "Comyn Abbot & Bishop of Ardmach Died"
- Annals of Inisfallen 660- "Repose of Tómíne, bishop of Ard Macha"
- Annals of Tigernach 660- "Comméne, abbot and bishop of Armagh, rested"
- Annals of the Four Masters 660- "St. Tomene-, son of Ronan, Bishop of Ard-Macha, died".
- Annals of Roscrea 661- "Toimini, abb-epscop Arda Machae, quieuit"
- Chronicon Scotorum 661- "Toiméne abbot and bishop of Ard Macha rested"
- Annals of Ulster 661- "Tóiméne son of Rónán, bishop of Ard Macha, died"

== Feast Day ==
After his death Tómméne was venerated as a saint and his feast was celebrated each 10 January, the day of his death. The Calendars of the Saints have the following entries-

- Martyrology of Gorman 10 January - "Tomméin, a successor of Patrick"
- Martyrology of Tallaght 10 January- "Tomini Ardamacha"
- Martyrology of Donegal 10 January- "Toimen, Successor of Patrick, A.D., 660."
