= Fedelmid Find =

Saint Fedelmid Find (also called Feidlimid Fin, Fethlin Fionn, Feidhlimidh Finn, Feidlimidh, Fedlimid, Fedilmid, Feidilmed; c. 500 – 30 October 578) was the Bishop of Armagh, Ireland from 558 to 578.

== Genealogy and birth ==
Saint Fedelmid Find was a descendant or grandson of Fáelan and was born c. 500 in a place called Domnach Nemand. He was presumably a younger son as he was destined for the church rather than succeeding to the family estate. He probably did not have a wife or children as he is referred to as "virginal" in the Martyrology of Gorman.

== Bishop of Armagh ==
On the death of Saint Fiachra mac Colmain, the Bishop of Armagh on 25 July 558, Fedelmid Find was appointed as the 11th Bishop in succession to Saint Patrick. Fedelmid Find reigned as Bishop for 20 years. Thomas Walsh states, without giving the source, that "Fedelmid Find was a great encourager of learning, and enlarged the seminary of Armagh, to which he was a great benefactor; he was also very active in organizing the new sees that were springing up in the provinces of the kingdom". Lebor Gabála Érenn, Vol. V, pp. 370–371, states that during the reign of the High-King Áed mac Ainmuirech, Feidlimid abbas Áird Macha (Feidlimid was abbot of Armagh).

== Death ==
St. Fedelmid Find died on 30 October 578. The Annals of Ireland give the following obits-

- Annals of the Four Masters 577- "Feidhlimidh Finn, Abbot of Ard-Macha, died"
- Annals of Ulster 578.3- "Feidlimid Finn, abbot of Ard Macha, rested"
- Annals from the Book of Leinster- Feidlimid, abbot of Armagh

== Feast Day ==
After his death Fedelmid Find was venerated as a saint and his feast was celebrated on 30 October, the day of his death. The Calendars of the Saints have the following entries-

- Martyrology of Gorman 30 October – "Virginal Fedilmid of Domnach"
- Martyrology of Donegal 30 October – "Feidhlimidh, of Domhnach."

However what is possibly a duplicate entry is listed under 20 December by the Martyrology of Donegal "Feidlimidh", the Martyrology of Gorman "shrewd Fedlimid" and the Martyrology of Tallaght "Feidlimidh".
