= Fiachra mac Colmain =

Bishop of Armagh from 548 to 558

Saint Fiachra (also called Fíachrach meic Colmáin; c. 500 – 25 July 558) was the Bishop of Armagh, Ireland from 548 to 558.

== Genealogy and birth ==
Saint Fiachra was a descendant of Muiredach Colla Fo Chrí, one of The Three Collas. His genealogy is "Fiachra m Colmain m Eoghain m Baodáin m Oilella m Suibhne m Maoileduin m Fionain m Oilella m Muireadhaig meith m Iomchadha m Colla da crioch", which is also confirmed in the Naemsenchus Náemh nÉrenn as "Sil na cColla. 94. Fiacra mac Colmain do siol Colla-Da-Croich coir do reir eolach ni heccóir" His mother was an embroideress. Fiachra was born c. 500 AD in Enach Senmáil (The Marsh of the Ancient Prince).

== Bishop of Armagh ==
On the death of Dubthach the Second, also called Duach II, the Bishop of Armagh, in 548, Saint Fiachra was appointed as the 10th successor to Saint Patrick. He reigned as Bishop for 10 years. In the old text Suidigud Tellaig Temra (The Settling of the Manor of Tara), the nobles of Ireland are attempting to partition Tara and they send for Fiachra as follows- "The nobles of Ireland were then summoned to the feast to the house of Tara by Diarmait son of Cerball. And they said that they would not partake of the feast of Tara until the settling of the manor of Tara was determined, how it was before their day and how it would be after them for all time, and they delivered that answer to Diarmait. And Diarmait replied that it was not right to ask him to partition the manor of Tara without taking counsel of Flann Febla son of Scannlan son of Fingen, that is, the head of Ireland and the successor of Patrick, or of Fiachra son of the embroideress. Messengers were accordingly dispatched to Fiachra son of Colman son of Eogan, and he was brought unto them to help them, for few were their learned men, and many were their unlearned, and numerous their contentions and their problems. Then Fiachra arrived, and they asked the same thing of him, namely to partition for them the manor of Tara. And he answered them that he would not give a decision on that matter until they should send for one wiser and older than himself. ‘Where is he?’ said they. ‘No hard matter that,’ said he, ‘even Cennfaelad son of Ailill son of Muiredach son of Eogan son of Niall. It is from his head,’ said he, ‘that the brain of forgetfulness was removed at the battle of Magh Rath, that is to say, he remembers all that he heard on the history of Ireland from that time down to the present day. It is right that he should come to decide for you."

There has been considerable confusion generated for centuries among scholars by the following entries in the Irish Annals-

- Annals of the Four Masters 550- "David, son of Guaire Ua Forannain, Bishop of Ard-Macha and Legate of all Ireland, died."
- Annals of Ulster 551- "Repose of Dáuíd of Farannán, son of Guaire descendant of Farannán, bishop of Ard Macha and legate of all Ireland."
- Annals of Ulster 553- "Or here, the repose of Dáuíd; bishop of Ard Macha and legate"

All the oldest lists (contained in the Book of Leinster, Psalter of Cashel, Yellow Book of Lecan and An Leabhar Breac), make Fiachra the successor of Duach and have no mention of aforesaid David mac Guaire. There are four possible explanations for the above annalistic entries on David macGuaire.

1. That he was in reality the same person as Duach II, the successor of Patrick who died in 548. This option was mooted by Professor James Carney who stated "This David is obviously identical (although the annals do not recognize the fact) with the Duach (or rather Daui) who died in 548 (Dauid is apparently a Latinisation of O.I. Daui). The obit of David Farannan, together with the statement that he was legatus, has apparently come into the annals from some unknown and rather late source". The objection to this view is that there already exists prior entries in the annals relating to Duach II. Annals of Ulster 548- "Dubthach or Duach, of the seed of Colla Uais, abbot of Ard Macha, rested." Annals of the Four Masters 547- "St. Dubhthach, Abbot of Ard-Macha, died. He was of the race of Colla Uais". Furthermore, the Book of Leinster list states Duach was a member of the Úi Tuirtri clan, whereas David was a member of the Úi Farannán clan. Also Duach is described only as an abbot while David is described only as a bishop.

2. The second possible explanation is that David and Fiachra was the same person. This option was proposed by John Colgan who felt that Fiachra was his tribal name rather than his Christian name because Úi Farannán was the family name of the herenachs of Ardstraw, County Tyrone while the surrounding tribe was called the Úi Fiachrach of Arda Stratha (e.g. the entry in the Annals of the Four Masters for 949 AD- "Guaire Ua Forannain, airchinneach of Ard-stratha,[died]"). The objections to this view are firstly that David died in 551 while Fiachra died in 558 and secondly that David's father was Guaire while Fiachra's father was Colman.

3. The next possible explanation is that David succeeded Duach II in 548 and died three years later in 551. This option is accepted by Cotton and by Ware. As none of the early succession lists mention David then this is unlikely.

4. The fourth and likeliest explanation is that David and Fiachra did live at the same time but that only Fiachra was the Coarb or recognized successor of St. Patrick. At that time there were two separate chief ecclesiastical offices in Armagh, the abbot and the bishop. Sometimes the posts were held by different men and sometimes the same man held both titles. It was not necessary for Patrick's successor to be both abbot and bishop, he could hold either post. This is the only explanation that gets over the objections raised above, i.e. Fiachra was the abbot of Armagh (as described in the Annals from the Book of Leinster) and Coarb in succession to St. Patrick (as described in the early succession lists of Armagh), while David macGuaire was the bishop of Armagh until his death in 551 AD (as described in the Annals of Ulster and the Four Masters) but he was not successor or Coarb of St. Patrick. There is no conflict here as nowhere is David described as either an abbot or successor to St. Patrick and nowhere is Fiachra described as a bishop.

== Death ==
Saint Fiachra died on 25 July 558 AD. The only mention of his obit in the Irish Annals is in the "Annals from the Book of Leinster" which state "Fiachra, abbot of Armagh" died during the reign of the High King Diarmait mac Cerbaill, who died in 565.

== Feast day ==
After his death, Fiachra was venerated as a saint and his feast was celebrated on 25 July, the day of his death. The Calendars of the Saints have the following entries-

- Martyrology of Gorman 25 July- "Two Fiachras, the white-great ones"
- Martyrology of Donegal 25 July- "Another Fiachra. There is a Fiachra, son of Colman, son of Eoghan, of the race of Colla-da-chrioch."
