= Dubthach the Second =

Saint Dubthach the Second (also called Dubhthach, Dubtach, Dubtagh, Duach the Younger, Duach II, Dúach, Duffy; c. 490 – 548) was the Bishop of Armagh, Ireland from 536 to 548.

== Genealogy and birth ==
St. Dubthach was a member of the Úi Thuirtri, a clan from the western shore of Lough Neagh who descended from Colla Uais.

== Bishop of Armagh ==
On the death of Saint Ailill the Second, the Bishop of Armagh, on 1 July 536, St. Dubthach was appointed as the 9th Bishop in succession to Saint Patrick. Saint Dubthach reigned as Bishop for 12 years. There is a reference in the Life of St. Tigernach of Clones to Duach. Scholars like Charles Plummer and Kim McCone assumed this refers to Dubthach the Second but the position of the anecdote in Tigernach's Life means it is more likely to refer to Dubthach the First, a view that Ware and Canon O’Hanlon agreed with.

== Death ==
St. Dubthach died in 548. The Annals of Ireland give the following obits-

- Annals of Ulster 548 - "Dubthach or Duach, of the seed of Colla Uais, abbot of Ard Macha, rested."
- Annals of the Four Masters 547 - "St. Dubhthach, Abbot of Ard-Macha, died. He was of the race of Colla Uais".
- Annals from the Book of Leinster - "Duach, abbot of Armagh"

== Feast day ==
The entry in the Annals of the Four Masters above refers to Dubthach as a saint. However no other record exists of his veneration or of his Feast Day.
