= Nuadu of Loch Uama =

Saint Nuadu (also called Aidan, Aidano, Aideno, Noadain, Noda, Nodain, Nodtat, Nuad, Nuada, Nuadan, Nuadat, Nuadato, Nuadha, Nuadhat, Nuado, Wogani; c. 760 – 19 February 812) was the Abbot and Bishop of Armagh, Ireland from 809 to 19 February 812.

== Genealogy and birth ==
Nuadu's genealogy does not seem to have survived. Archbishop Ware incorrectly states he was the son of Segene but this is a misreading of John Colgan (Acta Sanctorum Hiberniae, 19 February, p. 373), who was referring to a Nuadhat, son of Seigen who was killed in Offaly in 843. Nuadu was from the parish of Estersnow, barony of Boyle, County Roscommon. Two adjoining townlands in the parish are associated with him. Firstly the townland of Estersnow which is a corruption of the Gaelic, Ath-Disert-Nuadhain, meaning The Ford of Nuadu’s Hermitage, where he lived as an anchorite. John O’Donovan in a note under the year 1330 in the Annals of the Four Masters states- ‘His holy well, called Tobar Nuadhain, is still in existence, but at present very seldom resorted to by pilgrims. There is a tradition in the country there was a town here, but no trace of it now remains.‘ The following extract from an Inquisition taken in the reign of Elizabeth seems to corroborate this tradition: ‘Quod est quoddam forum sive mercatum in die Sabbatis qualibet septimana quondo non est guerra in patria, juxta templum Sancti Wogani vulgarite Temple-Issetnowne in baronia de Moy Lurg.‘ In another part of this Inquisition it is anglicised as Issertnowne. It is also called Tirs Nuadhain locally.

O’Donovan also writes in his O.S. Letters of 1835- "The original site of the church is still occupied by the Protestant one, and there is a holy well not far from it called Tobar Nuadhain, which is said to have been blessed by a monastic old gentleman of the name of Noone (a surname numerous in this country of Moylurg) but at what period no one remembers. This well is fast losing its sanctity and is now but seldom resorted to for cure. When it was in vogue it was visited by great numbers, and when the patient was not to recover from his malady, when he came to drink of its water, the blessed trouts of the well turned their bellies up, and seemed to be sickish and languid, but when he was to recover through the blessed waters of the well, they looked healthy and swam about briskly". The cave beside the well was where Nuadu lived as an anchorite and is marked as "Issertnowe" on the Ordnance Survey maps of the townland.

The second townland is Cavetown, which is an Anglicisation of the Gaelic Loch Uama, meaning The Lake of the Cave. It is also called Ballynahoovagh. John O’Donovan under the year 1487 in the Annals of the Four Masters states- "Baile-na-huamha, i.e. the town of the cave. This place is now called Baile na h-Úmhach in Irish, and Cavetown in English. It is situated between the lakes of Clogher and Cavetown."

== The Juvencus Manuscript ==
The Juvencus manuscript in Cambridge University was mainly written in the 9th century by a scribe named Nuadu. He signs off at the end with a request in old Welsh- "araut di nuadu" (A prayer for Nuadu). 19th century scholars assumed this was Bishop Nuadu of Armagh but modern scholarship tends to ascribe it to an Irish scribe working in Wales in the second half of the 9th century, which would be 50 years after bishop Nuadu's death. However, the matter is still in debate.

== Bishop of Armagh ==
On the death of Torbach mac Gormáin, the bishop of Armagh, on 16 July 809, Nuadu was appointed as the 32nd bishop in succession to Saint Patrick. Nuadu reigned as bishop for 3 years.

== Visitation of Connacht ==
In 811 Nuadu made an official visit to the province of Connacht, two years after his appointment as bishop, in order to prohibit certain abuses in the Connacht Church. He carried a relic of St. Patrick with him, an armarium, which was a chest for keeping vestments in a church sacristy. The annals give the following accounts of his visit-

Annals of the Four Masters 810- "Nuadha, Abbot of Ard-Macha, went to Connaught"

Annals of Ulster 811- "Nuadu, abbot of ArdMacha, went to Connacht with Patrick's law and his casket"

Chronicon Scotorum 811- "Nuadu, abbot of ArdMacha, went to Connacht with Patrick's law and his cáin."

The Vita tripartita Sancti Patricii gives the following reasons for Nuadu's visit to Connacht-

"Then they reared the son in the territory of Enda Artech, that is to say, bishop Domnall in Ailech Mor, which the community of Clonmacnois took away, bishop Coimid in Cluain Senmail, bishop Do-Bonnein Cluainna Manach .... their pupil on All Saints day .... veneration for his fosterer (S. Patrick) when he would come, a cow from each man to him. That servitude clave to the churches until Nuada abbot of Armagh released them. Cormac Snithene was the son’s name. Snithene’s field is before Dermag Cule Coennai. Tir Onma Snitheni (the land of Snithene’s tree) it is named. It is a regret to Patrick’s community that it was not given to them.”

"Then Patrick went into the district of Mag Luirg, and his horses were forcibly taken by the tribe of the Sons of Ere, and he cursed the people of that country. But bishop Maine of the Hui-Ailella besought Patrick to forgive his brethren, and Patrick weakened the malediction. And Maine washed Patrick’s feet with his hair and with his tears, and he drove the horses into a meadow and cleansed their hoofs in honour of Patrick. And Patrick said;-'There will be weeping and wailing and lamenting with the people of that country, and there will not be neighbourhood there in saeculum'; as is fulfilled, And Patrick said that he would have a great part of that country afterwards, as hath been fulfilled in Nodain of Loch Uama. Bishop Maine, moreover, is of Patrick’s household, and Geintene in the Echanach in Hui-Ailella."

== Death ==
Nuadu died on 19 February 812. The Annals of Ireland give the following obits-

Annals of the Four Masters 811- “Nuadha of Loch-Uamha bishop, anchorite, and abbot of Ard-Macha, died"

Annals of Ulster 812- "Nuadu of Loch Uama, bishop, anchorite and abbot of ArdMacha, fell asleep"

Chronicon Scotorum 812- "Nuadu of Loch Uama, bishop and abbot of ArdMacha, rested"

Annals from the Book of Leinster- "Nuado, abbot of Armagh, rested"

== Feast Day ==
After his death Nuadu was venerated as a saint and his feast was celebrated on 19 February, the day of his death. The Calendars of the Saints have the following entries-

Martyrology of Gorman 19 February- "Nuada bishop, good and godly protector"

Martyrology of Tallaght 19 February- "Nodtat eps."

Martyrology of Donegal 19 February- "Nuada, Bishop"

== See also ==
- Catholic Church in Ireland
