= Roland Jorz =

Irish archbishop

Roland Jorz, OP (some sources Jorse) was a medieval Archbishop of Armagh.

He was consecrated on 13 November 1311; and resigned before 22 August 1322. He acted as a suffragan bishop in the dioceses of the Diocese of Canterbury in 1323, and the Diocese of York in 1332.
