= Donagh O'Tighe =

Irish prelate

Styles of Donagh O'Tighe
- Reference style: The Most Reverend
- Spoken style: Your Grace or Archbishop

Donagh O'Tighe (also known as Donat O'Teige) was a 16th century Irish prelate: he was Roman Catholic Archbishop of Armagh in 1560; and held the post until his death in 1562.

Catholic Church titles
Preceded by George Dowdall	Roman Catholic Archbishop of Armagh; 1560–1562	Succeeded by Richard Creagh
