= Faughart =

Area in County Louth, Ireland

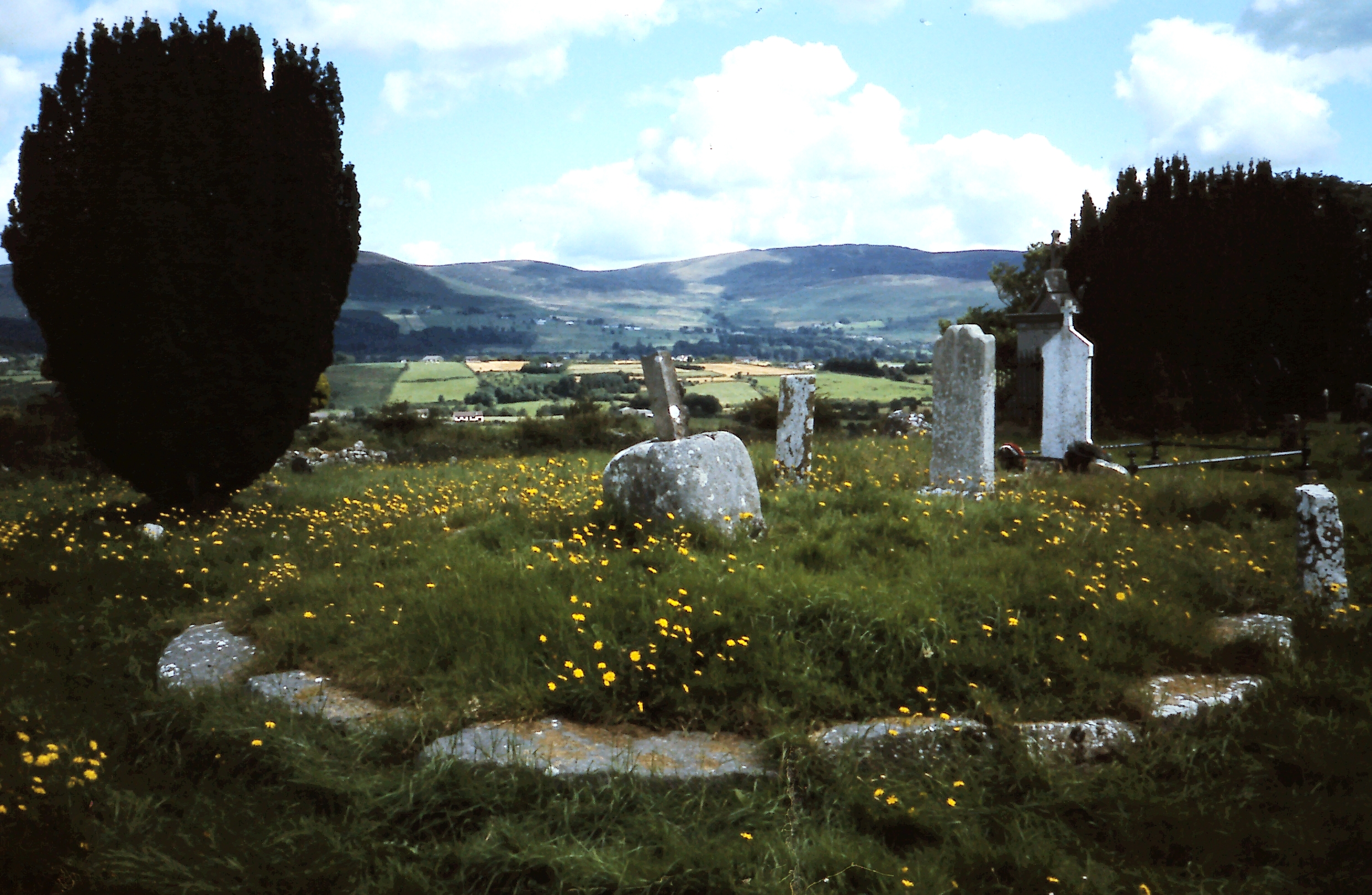
Faughart Graveyard

Faughart or Fochart (Irish: Fochaird) is an area north of Dundalk in County Louth, Ireland. The Hill of Faughart is the site of early Christian church ruins and a medieval graveyard, as well as a shrine to Saint Brigid.

According to tradition, it was the birthplace of Saint Brigid of Kildare in 451 AD. There are ruins of an early medieval church and graveyard on Faughart Hill. There are also two holy wells and a modern shrine devoted to Saint Brigid, which attracts thousands of pilgrims and tourists each year. St. Brigid's day is celebrated on 1 February. One of her relics is held in St Brigid's Church in nearby Kilcurry.

Following the Anglo-Norman invasion of Ireland, a Norman motte-and-bailey castle was built on Faughart Hill. Its ruins survive. In 1318, the Battle of Faughart was fought here between an Irish-Scottish force led by Edward Bruce and the Anglo-Normans. Bruce was defeated and killed in the battle, and he is buried in Faughart medieval graveyard (54°03′06″N 6°23′03″W).

Standing at the southern end of the Gap of the North/Moyry Pass, Faughart held huge strategic importance for many centuries and was the scene of several battles; one such legendary battle was fought by Cú Chulainn in the Táin Bó Cúailnge.

== Battles ==
=== 248 AD ===
A battle was fought at Faughart by Cormac Ulfada, High King of Ireland, against Storno (Starno), king of Lochlin.

=== 732 AD ===
The date of 732, or alternatively 735, is given for the Battle of Fochart between Áed Allán, king of Ireland, and Áed Róin, king of Ulaid. Áed Róin and Conchad mac Cúanach of Uí Echach Cobo were slain, with Áed Róin being decapitated on the Cloch an Commaigh (Stone of Decapitation) located near the door of the old church of Faughart. This conflict arose as a result of a request by Bishop Congus. The Annals of the Four Masters give the story as follows under the year 732:

The battle of Fochart, in Magh-Muirtheimhne [was fought] by Áed Allán High King of Ireland and the Clanna-Neill of the North, against the Ulidians, where Aedh Roin, King of Ulidia, was slain; and his head was cut off on Cloch-an-chommaigh [The Stone of Decapitation], in the doorway of the church of Fochard; and Conchadh, son of Cuanach, chief of Cobha [Magh Cobha, a plain in Iveagh, Co. Down], was also slain, and many others along with him. The cause of this battle was the profanation of Cill-Cunna [Kilcloony, parish of Ballyclog, Barony of Dungannon, Co. Tyrone] by Ua Seghain, one of the people of AedhRoin, of which Aedh Roin himself said: " I will not take its Conn from Tairr" for Ceall-Cimna and Ceall-Tairre [Cill-Thairre, anglice Kilharry, a glebe in the parish of Donaghmore, Barony of Dungannon, Co. Tyrone] are side by side. Congus, successor of Patrick, composed this quatrain, to incite Aedh Allan to revenge the profanation of the church, for he was the spiritual adviser of Aedh, so that he said:

‘Say unto the cold Aedh Allan, that I have been oppressed by a feeble army; Aedh Roin insulted me last night at Cill-Cunna of the sweet music.’

Aedh Allan collected his forces to Fochard, and Aedh Allan composed [these verses] on his march to the battle:

‘For Cill-Cunna, the church of my confessor, I take this day a journey on the road;Aedh Roin shall leave his head with me, or I shall leave mine with him.’

Of the same battle was said:

‘The slaughter of the Ulidians with Aedh Roin [was made] by Aedh Allan, King of Ireland. For their coigny at Cill-Cunna he placed soles to necks’

An Irish proverb arose from this incident: Torad penne Congusa (‘the fruit of Congus’s pen’), i.e. the downfall of the Ulaid resulted from the letter of Congus.

=== 1318 AD ===
The Battle of Faughart was fought on 14 October 1318 between a Hiberno-Norman force led by John de Bermingham, 1st Earl of Louth, and Edmund Butler, Earl of Carrick and a Scots-Irish army commanded by Edward Bruce, the brother of Robert Bruce, King of Scots, who had been hailed as King of Ireland by certain Irish chiefs.

== Sources ==
- Foster, R.F. The Oxford Illustrated History of Ireland. Oxford University Press, 2001, p. 83 online.
- Lehane, Brendan. The Companion Guide to Ireland. Companion Guides, 2001, p. 458 online.
- Lewis, Samuel. A Topographical Dictionary of Ireland, vol 2. London 1837. Full text downloadable.
- Saint Brigid’s Shrine & Well Faughart, with map
