= Iarlaithe mac Treno =

Iarlaithe mac Treno (also called Earlahy, Hierlath, Iarlaid, Iarlaide, Iarlaithi, Iarlathe, Iarlathi, Jarlaide, Jarlaithe, Jarlath, Yrlathei, Yrlatheus; c. 439 – 11 February 481) was the Bishop of Armagh, Ireland from 468 to 11 February 481.

== Genealogy and Birth ==
Iarlaithe was a member of the Dál Fiatach, a ruling dynasty centered on Downpatrick in east Ulster who were named after Fíatach Finn, a High King of Ireland who reigned in the 1st century A.D. Several of Iarlaithe's close family were saints. His twin brother was Saint Séadna, whose feast day is 16 June. His paternal uncle was St. Laoghaire of Dún. His paternal first cousins were St. Eoghan of Killchlethe, St. Niall of Killchlethe, St. Dichu of Saul (Feast 29 April), St. Duthracht of Nendrum (Feast 16 May), St. Ailill of Moville (Feast 12 January) and St. Ross of Dun da Leithglass (Feast 7 April). Iarlaithe's genealogy is-

"Iarlaithe -i. epscop m Treana m Fecc m lomchadha m Breasail m Siorchadha m Fiattaigh Finn m Daire m Dluthaigh m Detsin m Eathach m Sin m Rosin m Triuin m Roitriuin m Airnil m Maine m Forgo m Fearadhaig m Oilella érann m Fiacha firmara m Aonghasa tuirmigh temhrach m Echach foiltletain m Oilella caisfhiaclaigh m Connla cruaidcelgaigh m Irereo gleofhataigh m Melge molbthaigh m Cobthaigh caoilbregh m Ughoine moir"

This genealogy is also confirmed in the Naemsenchus Náemh nÉrenn as-

"Iarlaithe mac Trena truim dias ciallach nachar traicc treoin do Dail fFiatach na fireoin". However the genealogy seems incomplete as their obits imply about 10 generations between Iarlaithe and Fiatach Finn rather than the five generations given in the genealogies.

The Vita tripartita Sancti Patricii gives the following account of Iarlaithe's birth.-

‘Patrick once went on the road of Midluachair, to go into the land of Ulster, and there he met with wrights who were felling a yew-tree. Patrick saw that the blood came through the palms of the slaves at the felling. “Whence are ye?”; saith Patrick. “We are slaves” say they, “to Trian son of Fiacc, son of Amalgad, a brother of Trichem’s. We are in bondage and in great tribulation, and we are not allowed even to sharpen our irons against a flagstone, so that it may be the worse for us, and so that it may be the more difficult. Wherefore blood comes through our hands.”; Patrick blessed the irons so that they became the more easily used, and he went to the king, to Rath-Trena. And Patrick fasted against him. Trian did nothing for him. Patrick turned on the morrow from the fortress. He cast his spittle on the rock which lay on his road, and the rock broke into three. A third part of the spittle was then flung a thousand paces. Patrick said: ”Two thirds of the fasting on the rock, a third on the king and on the fort and on the district. There will be of Trian’s children neither king nor crown-prince. He himself shall perish early and shall go down into bitter hell.” Trian himself went to bind and beat the slaves who had given an account of him. His horses drag him and his charioteer off in his chariot, and went into the lake. Loch Trena is its name; that was his last fall. He will not come out of that lake until the vespers of Doomsday; and it will not be for happiness even then. The king's wife went after Patrick. She repented, she fell on her knees. Patrick blessed her womb and her children, namely, Setne, son of Trian and larlaide, son of Trian. Sechnall baptized Setne. Patrick baptized Iarlaide; and Patrick said that he would afterwards be a successor of his.

== Clonfeacle Church ==
After his ordination St. Jarlath was assigned to the church of Clonfeacle, which was founded by St. Patrick. The 12th century Book of Leinster states- "Iarlaithe mac Trena o Chluain Fiacla" (i.e. Iarlaithe, son of Trena, from Cluain Fiacla)

Chluain Fiacla has been identified with the church of Clonfeakle, in the townland of Tullydowey, parish of Clonfeacle, partly in the baronies of Armagh and Oneilland West, County Armagh, but chiefly in the barony of Dungannon Middle, Co. Tyrone. This identification is certainly correct as the present church of Clonfeacle is named St. Jarlath’s. That it was also so called in medieval times is evident from papal documents. For example the entry in the Lateran Regesta for August 1446 states- To the abbot of St. Patrick's, Newry, in the diocese of Dromore, and the archdeacon and the official of Dromore. Mandate (the pope having been informed by Thomas Oculean, clerk, of the diocese of Armagh, that Solomon Ocorra, rector called prebendary of the parish church of St. Yrlatheus the Bishop, Cluoynfechana, in the diocese of Armagh, wont to be governed by canons of Armagh only, has, when excommunicate and publicly proclaimed excommunicate, celebrated and taken part in masses and other divine offices in contempt of the Keys, thereby incurring irregularity, and has committed simony) if Thomas, who, on account of the inordinate favours which Solomon has in the city and diocese of Armagh, has no hope of obtaining justice therein, will accuse Solomon before them, etc. as usual, to summon Solomon, and if they find the above to be true, to deprive him, and in that event to make provision to the said Thomas of a canonry of Armagh and collate and assign to him the said rectory called a prebend, value not exceeding 14 marks sterling. Vite ac morum. (A. and Ja. de Vicentia. | A. viii. Residuum gratis pro deo. Idus Septembris Anno Sextodecimo. de Felletis."

With a follow-up dated 9 September 1446- "Thomas Oculean, principalis, obligavit se Camere super annata parrochialis ecclesie Sancti Yrlathei episcopi de Cluoynfecharia, Armachane dioc, cuius fructus, etc., quatuordecim marcharum sterlingorum communi extimatione, vacature per privationem Salomonis Occorra faciendam. Coll. eidem Rome apud S. Petrum, anno etc. mcccc°xlvi°, Idibus Augusti, anno sextodecimo."

That there was an early Christian church at the site has been confirmed by recent archaeological excavations.

== Bishop of Armagh ==
On the death of Saint Benignus of Armagh, the Bishop of Armagh, on 9 November 468, Iarlaithe was appointed as the 4th successor to Saint Patrick. Iarlaithe reigned as Bishop for 13 years. Iarlaithe is sometimes confused with St. Iarlaithe mac Loga of Tuam.

== Death ==
Iarlaithe died on 11 February 481. The Annals of Ireland give the following obits-

- Annals of the Four Masters 481- "Saint Jarlaithe, son of Treana, Bishop of Ard-Macha, resigned his spirit"
- Annals of Inisfallen 481- "Repose of Iarlaithe, the third abbot of Ard Macha"
- Annals of Ulster 481- "Repose of Iarlaithe, son of Trian, third bishop of Ard Macha"
- Annals of Clonmacnoise 481- "Earlahy, third Bushop of Ardmagh, dyed"
- Annals from the Book of Leinster- "The rest of Iarlathe, third bishop"

== Feast Day ==
After his death Iarlaithe was venerated as a saint and his feast was celebrated on 11 February, the day of his death. The Calendars of the Saints have the following entries-

- Martyrology of Gorman 11 February- "the name of larlaithe, the fair and high, in the (metre called) rindard, I utter".
- Martyrology of Tallaght 11 February- "Iarlaithi"
