= Ailill the First =

Bishop of Armagh from 513 to 526

Saint Ailill the First (also called Ailill the Elder, Ailill I, Ailiell, Ailild, Ailid, Alild, Ailillus, Alellus, Alildus, Oilill, Oileal, Oileald, Olildus, Olild, Elias, Eulalius, Helias; c. 460 – 13 January 526) was the Bishop of Armagh, Ireland from 513 to 13 January 526.

== Genealogy and birth ==
St. Ailill was a member of the Úi Bressail, a clan from the south side of Lough Neagh. He was born in Drum Cád in the Barony of Oneilland East, County Armagh, like his successor and kinsman Ailill the Second. He is sometimes confused with either or all of St. Ailill, Abbot of Moville; Ailill son of Trichem, St. Patrick's disciple & Ailill the Second of Armagh.

== Bishop of Armagh ==
On the death of Saint Dubthach the First, the Bishop of Armagh, in 513, St. Ailill was appointed as the 8th Bishop in succession to Saint Patrick. Saint Ailill reigned as Bishop for 13 years.

== Death ==
St. Ailill died 13 January 526. The Annals of Ireland give the following obits-

- Chronicon Scotorum 518- "Ailill, Abbot of Ardmacha, slept"
- Annals of Tigernach 520- "Ailill abbot of Armagh"
- Annals of Clonmacnoise 522- "Aillill abbott of Ardmacha, dyed"
- Annals from the Book of Leinster 523- "Ailill, the first, abbot of Armagh"
- Annals of the Four Masters 525- "Ailill, Bishop of Armagh, who was of the Ui Breasail, died"
- Annals of Ulster 526- "Ailill of the Uí Bresail, bishop of Ard Macha, rested"

== Feast day ==
After his death St. Ailill was venerated as a saint and his feast was celebrated each 13 January, the day of his death. The Calendars of the Saints have the following entries-

- Martyrology of Gorman 13 January- "Ailill, bishop of Ard Macha"
- Martyrology of Tallaght 13 January- "Ailill Epis"
- Martyrology of Donegal 13 January- "Ailell, Bishop, of Ard-Macha, A.D., 525"
