= Cormac of Armagh =

Cormac (also called Corbmac; c. 430 – 17 February 497), Bishop of Armagh and Abbot of Armagh monastery, Ireland from 481 to 17 February 497.

== Genealogy and birth ==
Cormac was from the Clann Chernaig in Crioch-an-Earnaidhe ('Territory of the Oratory', the modern placename of Urney, either in Co. Louth or Co. Tyrone) He is often confused with either or both of St. Cormac, bishop of Trim, Co. Meath who died in 745 or Cormac Snithine, the son of Enda, son of Niall of the Nine Hostages.

== Bishop of Armagh ==
On the death of Saint Iarlaithe mac Treno, the Bishop of Armagh, on 11 February 481, Cormac was appointed as the 5th Bishop in succession to Saint Patrick. Cormac reigned as bishop for 16 years. During his reign, he reconstituted Armagh into a monastic community and he became the first abbot of Armagh abbey. John Colgan states he worked many miracles.

== Death ==
Cormac died on 17 February 497. The Annals of Ireland give the following obits-

Chronicon Scotorum 494- "Bishop Cormac indernidhe, comharb of Patrick, pausavit"

Annals of the Four Masters 496- "Cormac, of Chrioch-in-Ernaidhe, successor of Patrick, resigned his spirit"

Annals of Inisfallen 497- "Repose of Cormac, bishop of Ard Macha"

Annals of Tigernach 497- "Bishop Cormac, of the Ernide, a successor of Patrick, rested"

Annals of Clonmacnoise 497- "Bushopp Cormack Inderny, Cowarb of St. Patrick, died"

Annals of Ulster 497- "Repose of Cormac, bishop of Ard Macha, successor of Patrick"

Annals from the Book of Leinster- "Cormac, first abbot"

== Feast day ==
After his death, Cormac was venerated as a saint and his feast was celebrated on 17 February, the day of his death. The Calendars of the Saints have the following entries which confuse him with St. Cormac, bishop of Trim, Co. Meath who died in 745-

Martyrology of Gorman 17 February- "full Cormac, bishop of Ath Truim, and a successor of Patrick, be the prayer of them all on my behalf that I may repent with tears"

Martyrology of Oengus 17 February- "Everyone proclaims it as far as the great sea, the feast of Cormac of pure prosperity. Cormac bishop of Áth Truim in Bregia. Or he is a successor of Patrick, i.e. a bishop from Áth Truim Húi Loeguiri in Meath"

Martyrology of Donegal 17 February- "Cormac, Bishop, of Ath Truim in Laeghaire, and successor of Patrick. Fuineacht, daughter of Maelfithrigh, son of Dioma, son of Colman, was his mother. A.D. 496."
