= Ailill the Second =

Saint Ailill the Second

Archbishop of Armagh
- Born: c. 480; Oneilland East, Armagh, Ireland
- Died: 1 July 536 (aged 55–56); Armagh, Ireland
- Venerated in: Catholic Church
- Feast: 1 July

Saint Ailill the Second (also called Ailill the Younger, Ailill II, Ailiell, Ailild, Ailid, Alild, Ailillus, Alellus, Alildus, Oilill, Oileal, Oileald, Olildus, Olild, Elias, Eulalius, Helias; c. 480 – 1 July 536) was the Bishop of Armagh, Ireland from 526 to 536.

== Genealogy and birth ==
St. Ailill was a member of the Úi Bressail, a clan from the south side of Lough Neagh. He was born in Drum Cád in the Barony of Oneilland East, County Armagh.

== Bishop of Armagh ==
On the death of his kinsman Saint Ailill the First, the Bishop of Armagh, on 13 January 526, St. Ailill was appointed as the 8th Bishop in succession to Saint Patrick. Saint Ailill reigned as Bishop for 10 years.

== Death ==
St. Ailill died on 1 July 536. The Annals of Ireland give the following obits-

- Annals of Tigernach 534- "Ailill abbot of Armadh died"
- Chronicum Scotorum 534- "Ailill, Abbot of Ardmacha, quievit"
- Annals of the Four Masters 535- "Oilill, Bishop of Armagh, died. He was also of the Ui-Breasail"
- Annals of Ulster 536- "Ailill, bishop of Ard Macha, died. He of the Uí Breasail still"
- Annals of Clonmacnoise 536- "Aillill, abbott of Ardmach, dyed"
- Annals from the Book of Leinster- "Ailill the second, abbot of Armagh"

== Feast day ==
After his death St. Ailill was venerated as a saint and his feast was celebrated on 1 July, the day of his death. The Calendars of the Saints have the following entries-

- Martyrology of Gorman 1 July- "Ailill, bishop of Armagh. to the troop without a second death, without regrowth of pain."
- Martyrology of Tallaght 1 July- "Ailella Esp. Cluana Emain"
- Martyrology of Donegal 1 July- "Ailill, Bishop, of Ard-Macha, A.D. 535"
- Bollandists Acta Sanctorum, Tomus I, Julii I. Among the pretermitted feasts, p. 2- "Alellus or Alildus II., Bishop of Armagh"
