= Coarb =

Medieval Irish ecclesiastical office

A coarb, from the Old Irish comarbae (Modern Irish: comharba, Latin: hērēs), meaning 'heir' or 'successor', was a distinctive office of the medieval Celtic Church among the Gaels of Ireland and Scotland. In this period coarb appears interchangeable with erenach, denoting the episcopally-nominated lay guardian of a parish church and headman of the family in hereditary occupation of church lands. The coarb, however, often had charge of a church which had held comparatively high rank in pre‐Norman Ireland, or one still possessed of relatively extensive termon lands.

Also as per this article "... such lucrative monastic offices as 'coarb' (comarbae 'heir' to a saint) or 'erenach' (airchinnech 'superior'), otherwise transmitted by natural or nepotic descent within ecclesiastical families, which were often the politically displaced branches of royal dynasties".

The current chief of Clan Livingstone in Scotland was recognised by Lord Lyon as the "Coarb of Saint Moluag" and the "Hereditable Keeper of the Great Staff of Saint Moluag".

== The coarb of Columba ==
In medieval Ireland and Scotland, the coarb of St. Columba (Middle Irish: comarba Coluim Chille) identified the abbots who succeeded Columba. When the monks fled to their monastery in Kells following the 9th-century Viking raids on Iona, their abbot continued to hold the title of coarb to reflect his direct inheritance: many of the early abbots were members of Columba's family.

The abbot of the collegiate church (i.e., a monastery following the Rule of St. Columba), who held holy orders and celebrated Mass ('serveth the cure'), was responsible for his monastic community. In time, the pattern of a bishop and an abbot of Iona was established, which after the Reformation and the dissolution of the monasteries fell into disuse.
