= Coppinger =

Origin
- Region of origin: Ireland and United Kingdom

Other names
- Variant forms: Copinger, Coppenger, Copenger, Coppynger, Copinsher

Coppinger is a surname of Norse origin historically associated with Ireland and the counties of Suffolk and Kent in England, and the seaboard of Northern France.

While there are various spellings in historical documents, after more standardised spellings became established in the C18th the main variant was between Coppinger and Copinger. Whether an individual chose to use one or two ps seems to have been a question of personal preference which thereafter became a fixed tradition in their descendants.

== Notable people ==
Notable people with the surname include:

- Barry Coppinger, British politician
- Charles Coppinger (1851–1877), English cricketer
- Captain Cuthbert Coppinger, DSC, Royal Navy, Hero of the Battle of Jutland.
- Edward Coppinger (1846–1927), English cricketer
- Edward Coppinger (1972–), Massachusetts State Representative 2011–2023
- George Coppinger Ashlin (1837–1921), Irish architect
- James Coppinger (born 1981), English professional footballer
- John W. Coppinger (1852–1900), American politician and lawyer
- José María Coppinger, prominent Cuban soldier and governor
- Marion Coppinger, wife of Charles Howard, 11th Duke of Norfolk, (17??-1768). Died in childbirth.
- Maurice Coppinger (1727–1802), Irish barrister and politician for whom Coppinger Row is named
- Mike Coppinger, American boxing journalist
- Richard William Coppinger (1847–1910), British naval surgeon and naturalist
- Rocky Coppinger (born 1974), Major League Baseball player
- Ruth Coppinger, Irish Socialist Party politician for Dublin West
- Septimus Coppinger (1828–1870), English cricketer
- Sioban Coppinger (born 1955), Canadian-born English sculptor
- Sir Walter Coppinger (died 1639), Irish noble
- Walter Arthur Copinger (1847–1910), English lawyer & author, hymn writer, co-founder of the Bibliographical Society, London, and Angel in the Catholic Apostolic Church
- William Coppinger (1849–1877), English cricketer
- William Coppinger (bishop), Irish bishop

== See also ==
- Copine, group of human proteins
- Coppinger's Court, a ruined fortified house near Rosscarbery in Ireland
- Cruel Coppinger, a semi-legendary figure in Cornish folklore
- Glenville, County Cork, the main Coppinger estate in the eighteenth century
- Radiodiscus coppingers, a species of gastropod in the family Charopidae; found in Argentina, Brazil, and Chile
