= Edward Hinton =

Edward Hinton may refer to:

- Edward Hinton (priest), Irish Anglican priest
- Edward W. Hinton, professor of law
- Ed Hinton (sportswriter), motorsports columnist
- Ted Hinton (footballer), Northern Irish footballer

== See also ==
- Ed Hinton (disambiguation)
- Eddie Hinton, American songwriter and session musician
- Eddie Hinton (American football), American football wide receiver
- Ted Hinton, Texas deputy sheriff
