= John Crooks (priest) =

John Robert Megaw Crooks (9 July 1914 – 17 March 1995) was Dean of Armagh from 1979 to 1989.

Crooks was educated at Campbell College and Trinity College, Dublin. He was ordained in 1939. After a curacy in Dublin he was a minor canon at St Patrick's Cathedral, Dublin. He was the rector of Killylea from 1944 to 1956; and vicar choral of Armagh Cathedral from 1956 to 1973. He was Archdeacon of Armagh from 1973 until his move to the Deanery.

Church of Ireland titles
Preceded by Abraham Lockett Ford	Archdeacon of Armagh; 1973–1979	Succeeded by Frederick William Gowing
Preceded by Henry Alexander Lillee	Dean of Armagh; 1979–1989	Succeeded by Herbert Cassidy
