= Raymond Hoey =

Raymond George Hoey (born 1946) was Archdeacon of Armagh from 1992 to 2014.

Hoey was educated at Trinity College, Dublin and ordained in 1973. After a curacy in Portadown he was the incumbent of Camlough and also chaplain to Archbishop Robin Eames.

Church of Ireland titles
Preceded by Bill Colthurst	Archdeacon of Armagh; 1992–2014	Succeeded by Terry Scott
