= Francis Higgins =

Francis Higgins may refer to:

- Francis Peter Higgins (athlete) (1928–1993), British athlete who competed in the 1956 Summer Olympics
- Francis Higgins (soccer), U.S. soccer goalkeeper
- Francis Higgins (cyclist) (1882–1948), British Olympic cyclist who competed in the 1912 Summer Olympics
- Francis Higgins (priest), 18th century Anglican clergyman
- Francis Higgins (1746–1802), Irish newspaper proprietor and spy
- Francis "The Viper" Higgins, a character in the Irish comedy series Hardy Bucks

== See also ==
- Frank Higgins (disambiguation)
