= William Perceval =

Irish priest

William Perceval D.D. was an Irish priest in the first decades of the 18th century.

The nephew of Sir John Perceval, 1st Baronet, he was educated at Christ Church, Oxford and Trinity College Dublin. He was Archdeacon of Cashel from 1703 until 1725; and Dean of Emly from 1714 until 1735. He also became a Prebendary of Christ Church Cathedral, Dublin in 1720. He married (1708) Catherine, daughter of Henry Prittie of Killboy and Dunalley.

Church of Ireland titles
Preceded by Edward Hinton	Archdeacon of Cashel; 1703–1725	Succeeded by Francis Higgins
Preceded by John Wetherby	Dean of Emly; 1714–1735	Succeeded by John Auchmuty
