= Bill Colthurst =

Irish Deacon (1922-2009)

Reginald William Richard (Bill) Colthurst (1922–2009) was Archdeacon of Armagh from 1985 to 1989.

Colthurst was educated at Trinity College, Dublin and the Church of Ireland Theological College. He was ordained in 1942. After curacies in Portadown and Belfast he was the incumbent of Ardtrea, then Richhill, and then Mullavilly.

Church of Ireland titles
Preceded by Frederick Gowing	Archdeacon of Armagh; 1985–1992	Succeeded by Raymond Hoey
