= Robert Maxwell (bishop) =

17th-century Anglican bishop in Ireland

The Right Reverend Robert Maxwell
- Bishop of Kilmore and Ardagh
- Church: Church of Ireland
- Diocese: Kilmore and Ardagh
- Appointed: 1661
- Term ended: 16 November 1672
- Other posts: Archdeacon of Down (1628–1643), Bishop of Kilmore (1643–1661)

Personal details
- Born: c. 1611
- Died: 16 November 1672
- Denomination: Anglican
- Parents: Robert Maxwell, Dean of Armagh
- Spouse: Margaret Echlin
- Children: 6
- Education: Trinity College, Dublin

Robert Maxwell was a 17th-century Anglican bishop in Ireland.

The eldest son of Robert Maxwell, Dean of Armagh, he was educated at Trinity College, Dublin. A prebendary of Armagh he was appointed Archdeacon of Down in 1628; and Bishop of Kilmore in 1643. He became Bishop of Kilmore and Ardagh when the two sees were united again in 1661. He died on 16 November 1672.

He married Margaret Echlin, daughter of Robert Echlin, Bishop of Down and Connor and Jane Seton, and had six children. His descendants held the title Earl of Farnham.
