= Frederick Gowing =

Irish Anglican priest

Frederick William Gowing OBE (1918–2001) was Archdeacon of Armagh from 1979 to 1984.

Gowing was educated at Trinity College, Dublin and the Church of Ireland Theological College. He was ordained in 1942. After a curacy in Portadown he was the incumbent of Woodschapel, and then Mullavilly.

Church of Ireland titles
Preceded by John Crooks	Archdeacon of Armagh; 1979–1984	Succeeded by Bill Colthurst
