= Nicholas de Mellipont =

Irish priest

Nicholas de Mellipont was Archdeacon of Armagh in 1300.
