= Brice (Dean of Armagh) =

13th century Irish clergy

Brice (some sources say Bricius, others Brieius) was Archdeacon of Armagh in 1269 and Dean of Armagh in 1272. His name appears in a deed that is dated 1301.
