= James Frey (disambiguation) =

James Frey (born 1969) is an American writer, author of A Million Little Pieces.

James Frey may also refer to:

- James N. Frey (born 1943), American writer, author of How to Write a Damn Good Novel and numerous Cold War era political thrillers
- Jim Frey (born 1931), Major League Baseball manager
- James Frey (priest) (1606–1636), Swiss dean in Ireland, born Johann Jacob Frey

== See also ==
- James Barnet Fry (1827–1894), U.S. Army officer and historical writer
- James Frye (1709–1776), American Revolutionary War soldier
