= Edward Hudson (priest) =

Irish priest

Edward Gustavus Hudson (1791–1851) was an Irish priest in the middle of the 19th century: he was Dean of Armagh from 1842 until 1851.

Hudson was educated at Trinity College, Dublin. A member of the Royal Dublin Society, he died on 14 August 1851 at Glenville, County Cork.

Church of Ireland titles
Preceded by James Edward Jackson	Dean of Armagh; 1842–1851	Succeeded by William Brabazon Disney
