= James Downhame =

James Downham, D.D. was Dean of Armagh from 1667 until his death in 1681.

== Parentage and education ==
He was the youngest son of Bishop George Downhame, Bishop of Derry from 1616 to 1634, and his first wife, Ann Harrison. He was born when his father was Rector of Great Munden in Hertfordshire, where he was baptised on 24 February 1611. The seat of his education is unknown but he was described as a Bachelor of Divinity in the patent appointing him to the Armagh deanery.

== First clerical appointments ==
He was admitted to the Prebend of Moville in Inishowen, County Donegal, in September 1634, five months after the death of his father (who had established the prebend in 1629). In 1656 he was the government-salaried Minister at Moville, where the church glebe had been confiscated earlier in the Interregnum and where he may have officiated in previous years. Although many incumbents in other parts of Ulster had been ejected from their livings, the clergy of Inishowen remained relatively safe from purges by extreme Puritans until around 1657.

== Property ==
The Civil Survey of 1654-56 recorded that he held lands belonging to the Bishopric of Derry in the Inishowen parishes of Clonmany and Clonca, and that he claimed to have a 40-years lease of the See's townlands in Clondermot granted by his father. He also held 750 acres of Church land at Clonleigh in Lifford as heir to his recently deceased brother William. Under the will of his stepmother, Dame Margery Roe, proved in 1656, he was to inherit her house, churchlands, chattels and plate.

== Senior church appointments ==
At the Restoration he obtained the Prebend of Tynan in County Armagh which, until appointed Dean of Armagh, he held in conjunction with the rectory of Derrynoose. In 1661 the Irish House of Lords granted his petition for possession of the glebes which endowed the Tynan and Derrynoose livings and which had been occupied by others during the Commonwealth period. He was instituted as Dean on 10 January 1668 and was also Rector and Vicar of Armagh. In October 1668, at the request of the Archbishop of Armagh, he was appointed to the valuable living of Clonfeacle by Trinity College, Dublin, and thereupon resigned as rector of Derrynoose.

== Death and children ==
Described in 1668 as "a grave man", he died in June or July 1681 leaving two daughters and coheiresses: Ann, who married Arthur Newburgh (High Sheriff of Tyrone in 1667), and Jane who married Walter Cope and was grandmother of Walter Cope, Bishop of Ferns and Leighlin, 1782–87.

Church of Ireland titles
Preceded by Francis Marsh	Dean of Armagh; 1667–1681	Succeeded by Bartholomew Vigors
