= Donald Macrivayr =

Donald Macrivayr, a priest of the Diocese of Clogher, was appointed Dean of Armagh in 1492 At some point the previous incumbent Peter O'Mulmoy was restored.
