= Thomas Waryn =

Thomas Waryn (some sources Waryng) was Archdeacon of Armagh from 1448 from his death in 1477.
