= Mauritius (disambiguation) =

Mauritius is an island nation in the Indian Ocean.

Mauritius may also refer to:

== Places ==
- Mauritius (1968–1992), an independent state, the predecessor to the modern-day Mauritius
- British Mauritius (1810–1968), a former British Crown Colony

== People ==
- Mauritius (given name)
- Saint Maurice or Mauritius (died c. 287), Egyptian leader of the Theban Legion martyred for refusing to attack fellow Christians
- Mauritius (Dean of Armagh), Dean in 1238

== Other uses ==
- Mauritius (1612), a Dutch wooden-hulled sailing ship
- HMS Mauritius (shore establishment), a radio station in Mauritius from 1962 to 1975
- 45617 Mauritius, a British LMS Jubilee Class locomotive
- Mauritius (play), a 2007 Broadway play
- Mauritius Open, a golf tournament played on the island from 1994 through 2008
- Mauritius International, an annual badminton tournament
- Mauritius (typeface), a 1967 type produced by C.E. Weber
