= Roger Stedman =

Irish cleric

Roger Stedman was Archdeacon of Armagh from 1414 to 1426: he is also recorded as a Prebendary of Tipperkevin at St Patrick's Cathedral, Dublin in 1438
