= Auchmuty =

Auchmuty is a surname. Notable people with the surname include:

- James Auchmuty (1909–1981), Irish-born historian
- John Auchmuty (fl. 18th century), Irish Christian cleric
- Richard T. Auchmuty (1831–1893), American soldier, architect, and philanthropist
- Samuel Auchmuty (British Army officer) (1758–1822), American-born British Army general
- Samuel Benjamin Auchmuty (1780–1868), Irish-born general of the British Army
- John Auchmoutie (fl. 1580–1635), Scottish courtier.
