= Laurence (Archdeacon of Armagh) =

13th century archdeacon of armagh

Laurence was Archdeacon of Armagh in 1219: he was still in office in 1229.
