= John Auchmuty =

James Auchmuty was an Irish dean in the middle of the 18th century.

A former Dean of Emly, Auchmuty was Dean of Armagh from 1736 until 1753.

Church of Ireland titles
Preceded by William Perceval	Dean of Emly; 1735–1736	Succeeded by John Brandreth
Preceded by John Brandreth	Dean of Armagh; 1736–1753	Succeeded by Anthony Cope
