= Gregory Dunstan =

Gregory John Orchard Dunstan was Dean of Armagh until 2020.

Born in 1950, grew up in England, he was educated at Trinity College, Dublin; and ordained in 1991. He began his ecclesiastical career with a curacy in Ballymena, after which he was the incumbent at St Matthew, Belfast until his appointment as Dean.

Church of Ireland titles
Preceded by Patrick Rooke	Dean of Armagh; 2011–2020	Succeeded by Shane Forster
