= Richard Daniels (disambiguation) =

Richard Daniels (1864–1939) was a Welsh-born American film actor.

Richard Daniels may also refer to:

- Mickey Daniels (Richard Daniels Jr., 1914–1970), American actor
- Dick Daniels (Richard Bernard Daniels, born 1944), American football defensive back
- Richard Daniels, a character in The Son of Dr. Jekyll

== See also ==
- Rik Daniëls (born 1962), Belgian television director
- Richard Daniel (1900–1986), German soldier
- Richard Daniel (priest) (1681–1739), Church of Ireland priest
