= Peter Wentworth (priest) =

17th Century English Priest

Peter Wentworth (1601–1661) was an Anglican priest in the 17th century.

Wentworth was born in Northamptonshire. He was a Fellow of Balliol College, Oxford. He was Rector of Riseholme from 1633 to 1637, Dean of Armagh from 1637 to 1641; and Archdeacon of Carlisle from 1645.

He his last post was as Rector of Great Haseley. He died at Bath on 22 July 1661.
