= John O'Goband =

John O'Goband, a priest in the Diocese of Kilmore, was appointed Dean of Armagh in 1398, and served until 1406
