= Le Poer M'Clintock =

The Very Reverend Francis George le Poer McClintock
- Born: 8 October 1853
- Died: 3 February 1924 (aged 70)
- Education: Trinity College, Cambridge
- Term: 1908–1924
- Predecessor: Robert Shaw-Hamilton
- Successor: Robert Hamilton
- Ordained: 1879
- Title: Dean of Armagh

Francis George le Poer McClintock (8 October 1853 – 3 February 1924) was Dean of Armagh from 1908 until his death.

McClintock was educated at Trinity College, Cambridge; and ordained in 1879. He began his career at Kilsaran. In 1886 he became Rector of Drumcar, where he was to remain for the rest of his life. He was Domestic Chapalin to the Archbishop of Armagh from 1896 to 1911; and Precentor of Armagh Cathedral during the same period. He was also Chaplain to the Lord Lieutenant of Ireland from 1902 to 1905.

There is a memorial to him in the north aisle at his cathedral.

Church of Ireland titles
| Preceded by Robert Shaw-Hamilton | Dean of Armagh; 1908–1924 | Succeeded by Robert Hamilton |
