= William Coppinger =

English cricketer

William Coppinger (3 June 1849 – 6 October 1877) was an English cricketer who played seven first-class cricket matches for Kent County Cricket Club between 1868 and 1873.

Coppinger was born at Bexley in Kent in 1846, the son of Edward and Mildred Coppinger. His father was a publican and came from a cricketing family. He played club cricket as a teenager for Eltham and then across Metropolitan Kent, including for Blackheath against the touring Australian Aboriginal team in 1868.

He made his first-class cricket debut for Kent in 1868, playing against Sussex at Hove. Coppinger played five matches for the county in 1870, although he failed to take a wicket and made only single-figure scores, and made his final appearance in 1873, taking his only two first-class wickets in a match against Sussex at Hove where he played alongside his brother Edward. Another brother, Charles, and an uncle Septimus both also played first-class cricket.

Coppinger emigrated to Australia in 1876 and played some cricket for South Adelaide Cricket Club. He died in Adelaide, South Australia in 1877 aged 28.

== Bibliography ==
- Carlaw, Derek (2020). Kent County Cricketers, A to Z: Part One (1806–1914) (PDF). Cardiff: ACS.
