= Brabazon Disney =

Irish dean

Brabazon William Disney was an Irish Dean in the middle of the 19th century.

Disney was born in County Louth on 13 July 1797 and educated at Trinity College, Dublin. He held incumbencies at Siddan, Stackallan and Inishmot before becoming Archdeacon of Raphoe in 1835, a post he held for ten years until he became Dean of Emly. In his spare time he compiled an eight-volume collection of his sermons. He was Dean of Armagh from 1851 until his death on 20 December 1874.

There is a memorial to his wife Anna on the wall of the north transept of St Patrick's Cathedral, Armagh.

== Arms ==
Coat of arms of Brabazon Disney
| Notes Granted 8 May 1861 by Sir John Bernard Burke, Ulster King of Arms Crest A lion passant guardant Gules charged on the breast with a fleur-de-lis Or. Escutcheon Argent on a fess Gules three fleurs-de-lis Or in chief a trefoil slipped Vert. Motto Vincit Qui Patitur (Latin for "He who endures, conquers") |
