= Terence Daniel =

Terence Daniel (Irish: Toirdhealbhach Ó Dómnaill; also known as Tirlagh O'Donnell) was a sixteenth century priest in Ireland.

Daniel was appointed Dean of Armagh in 1550. He served under both Queens Mary and Elizabeth
