= Maurice O'Corry =

Dean of Armagh (1380-1398)

Maurice O'Corry was appointed the Dean of Armagh in 1380 and deprived in 1398.
