= Benjamin Barrington =

Irish cleric

Benjamin Barrington, D.D. (1713-1774) was Dean of Armagh from 1764 to 1768

Barrington was born in Dublin and educated at Trinity College, Dublin. He became Rector of Armagh in 1759. He died on 19 October 1774.

Church of Ireland titles
Preceded by Anthony Cope	Dean of Armagh; 1764–1764	Succeeded by Hugh Hamilton
