= Bartholomew Vigors =

Bartholomew Vigors (1644–1721) was an Anglican priest in Ireland in the late seventeenth and early eighteenth centuries.

He was the fourth son of the Reverend Urban Vigors of Ardnageehy, County Cork, and his wife Catherine Boyle, daughter of the Reverend Thomas Boyle. They belonged to a branch of the prominent landowning family of Leighlinbridge, County Carlow. Vigors was educated at Trinity College, Dublin. He was Chancellor of Ferns then Dean of Armagh from 1681 until 1691; and Bishop of Ferns and Leighlin from then until his death on 3 January 1721.

Having purchased the manor of Old Leighlin in County Carlow from Joseph Deane, the Chief Baron of the Irish Exchequer, in his will he bequeathed it to his successors as Bishop in perpetuity, in addition to numerous other charitable bequests. He was buried at St Patrick's Cathedral, Dublin.

He married Martha Neale, daughter of Constantine Neale of New Ross, County Wexford. They had at least six children, including Martha who married Sir Thomas Burdett, 1st Baronet of Dunmore, Susanna who married St. Leger Gilbert (brother of the Countess of Cavan), and Katherine who married John Beauchamp.

Church of Ireland titles
Preceded by James Downhame	Dean of Armagh; 1681–1691	Succeeded by Arthur Smyth
Preceded by Narcissus Marsh	Bishop of Ferns and Leighlin; 1691–1722	Succeeded by Josiah Hort
