= Patrick O'Kerry =

Patrick O'Kerry (some sources Patrick O’Korry) was appointed Dean of Armagh in 1362 and was still living in 1370.
