= Richard (Dean of Armagh) =

Richard appears as Dean of Armagh in 1206, the first recorded incumbent. He presumably served until his replacement by Marcus in 1238.
