= Dionysius (Dean of Armagh) =

Dionysius (some sources Denis) was appointed Dean of Armagh in 1301 and served until 1330.

In 1303 he was elected Archbishop of Armagh but declined. He is mentioned in the Pipe Rolls of 1313 and in In 1319, acting for Roland Jorz, Archbishop of Armagh he confirmed the election of Michael Mac Lochlainn to the Bishopric of Derry. In 1325 he is witness to the publication of a Papal Bull at Armagh.
