= Thomas Nachamayl =

Irish Anglican cleric

Thomas Nachamayl (some sources N'Camail) was appointed Dean of Armagh in 1475 and served until 1485.
