= Charles Coppinger =

English cricketer

Charles Coppinger (10 April 1851 – 1 August 1877) was an English cricketer who played a single first-class cricket match for Kent County Cricket Club at the age of 19 in 1870.

Coppinger was born in Bexleyheath in Kent in 1851, the son of Edward and Mildred Coppinger. His father was a publican and came from a cricketing family. Coppinger played club cricket for teams such as New Cross and Woolwich and made his only first-class appearance for Kent against Surrey at The Oval in 1870, scoring 13 runs in his two innings.

Like his father Coppinger also worked as a publican, first at Eltham and then at New Cross. He married Jane Hutchinson in 1874; the couple had one daughter who died as an infant. Coppinger himself died at New Cross in 1877 of rheumatic fever and acute meningitis aged 26. Two of his brothers, Edward and William, and an uncle Septimus all played first-class cricket.

== Bibliography ==
- Carlaw, Derek (2020). Kent County Cricketers, A to Z: Part One (1806–1914) (PDF). Cardiff: ACS.
