= Terry Scott (priest) =

Irish Anglican priest (born 1956)

Terence Scott (born 1956) is an Irish Anglican priest. He has been Archdeacon of Armagh since 2014.

Scott was educated at Queen's University, Belfast. He was ordained in 1981 and his first posts were curacies at Ballymena and Antrim. After that he held incumbencies at Connor and Magherafelt. He was vicar choral at Armagh Cathedral from 1995 to 2006 when he was appointed a canon.
