= Maurice Coppinger =

Irish lawyer and politician

Maurice Coppinger (1727– 6 October 1802) was an Irish barrister and politician, who sat in the Irish House of Commons for many years, and held the office of King's Serjeant. His name is commemorated in Coppinger Row, a side street in central Dublin city; his townhouse was on South William Street nearby.

In his own lifetime, he inspired the phrase "to be issued with a Coppinger", i.e. to be served with a writ from the Court of Chancery (Ireland). Despite his eminence in the legal world, he suffered from chronic money troubles in his later years, partly as a result of a lawsuit that he lost, and also as a result of his dismissal from the lucrative offices of Serjeant-at-law and standing counsel to the Revenue Commissioners. He was said to be a man who could not live without a large income.

== Family ==
He was born in Dublin, the elder son of John Coppinger, a landowner and army officer, and Mary Ann Crosbie, daughter of Maurice Crosbie, 1st Baron Brandon and Lady Elizabeth Fitzmaurice, and sister of William Crosbie, 1st Earl of Glandore. His father belonged to the well-known Coppinger (or Copinger) family of County Cork. John's principal estate was at Glenville, a few miles from Cork city; he also owned property in County Kildare. John spent his later years in Dublin and died there in 1752. His death caused a lawsuit between Maurice, who was executor of the will, and his brother Robert, concerning ownership of the family lands in County Kildare. Maurice married Anne Mitchell, daughter of Henry Mitchell, banker, of Dublin, and his wife Margaret Webber, in 1766. Her brother was Hugh Henry Mitchell, MP for Ballyshannon and for Enniskillen.

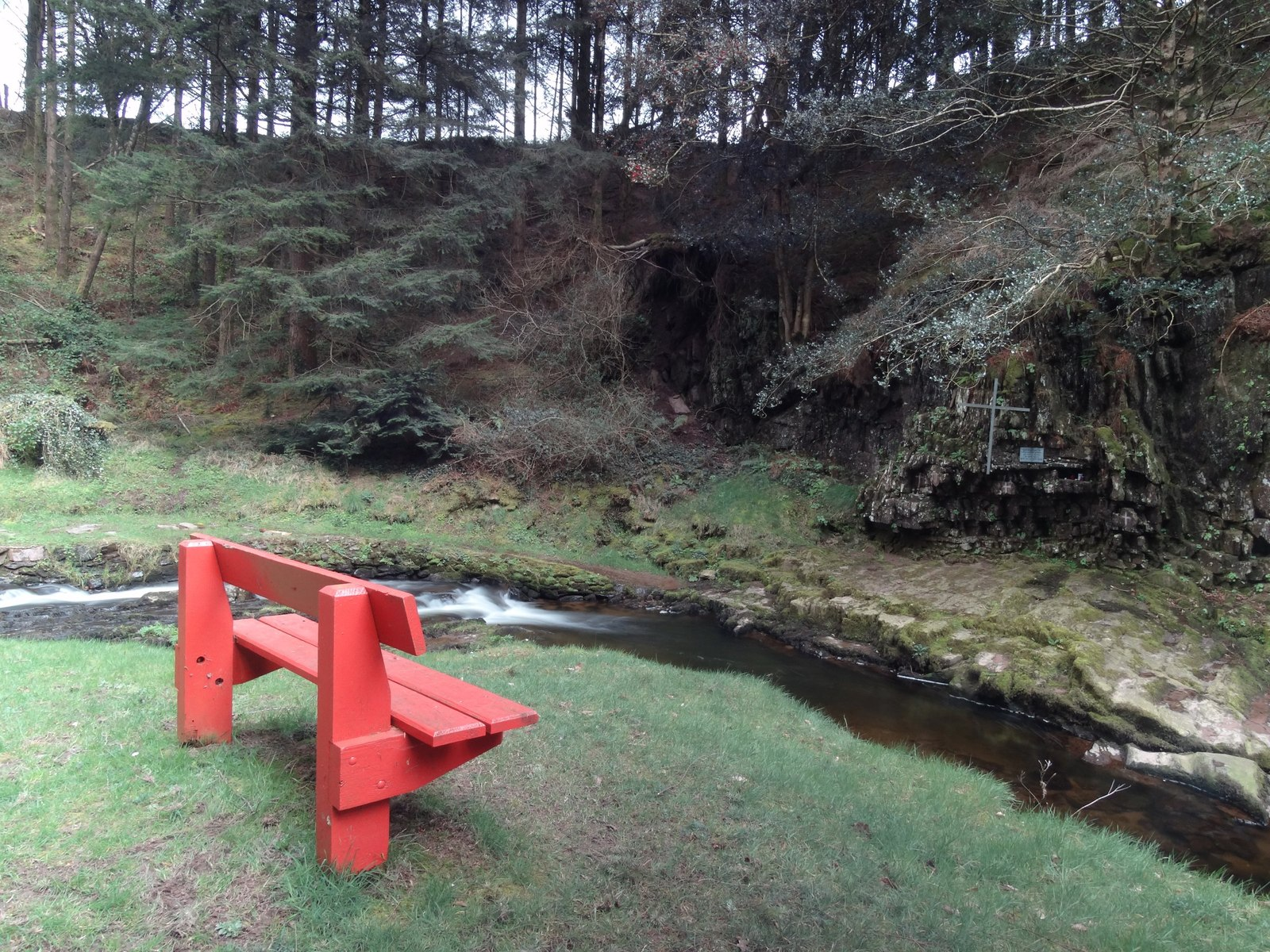
Glenville- the Mass Rock. Coppinger owned Glenville until the 1770s

== Politics ==
Maurice was educated at Trinity College Dublin, where he took his degree in 1743, and entered the Middle Temple in 1747. He was called to the Bar in 1754, and later took silk. He sat for many years in the Irish House of Commons, benefitting from the patronage of his mother's powerful family. He sat as MP for Ardfert 1758–83, for Roscommon 1783–90, for Belturbet 1790–9, and very briefly for Roscommon again in 1800, being one of the last members elected to the Commons before its abolition by the Act of Union 1800. He was a reliable Government supporter and an effective though reluctant speaker in the Commons.

== Law Officer ==
He was appointed Third Serjeant-at-law (Ireland) in 1770 and promoted to Second Serjeant in 1774. He went as an extra judge on the Leinster circuit in 1774. He was dismissed from office in 1777, but was asked to serve as an extra judge of assize in 1776. He is said to have been dismayed by his dismissal, as it involved a serious loss of income to a man already beset by money troubles, especially after a lawsuit went against him in 1778. Likewise, the abrupt termination of his short but lucrative career as counsel to the Revenue Commissioners (from 1780 to 1782) was a serious blow to him financially. He eventually obtained a minor Government office, Clerk of the Ships, through the goodwill of the influential statesman John Beresford, the senior Revenue Commissioner, who understood that Coppinger was a bad financial manager.

== Character and later life ==
He wrote at least one legal textbook, "Coppinger's Abridgment". He was described as a man of heavy build, quiet and reserved in manner. He was notably extravagant in his manner of living, being described as a man who could not exist without a comfortable income.

He sold Glenville in the 1770s: this may have been because his wife, after several years of marriage, had still not produced a male heir, but it is more likely that he needed money to pay the costs of a protracted lawsuit against him by Theobald Wolfe and William Alcock, which resulted in a Court decree against him in 1778, requiring him to pay heavy damages. The decree was said to have left him virtually bankrupt, and certainly, he was greatly troubled by financial worries in later life. He and his wife had one son, John James Coppinger (1780–1813), who became a Church of Ireland clergyman.

His Dublin house was on South William Street, and nearby Coppinger Row was named after him. He died in 1802: his wife Anne Mitchell, who was an aunt of the distinguished Army officer Colonel Hugh Henry Mitchell, survived him. In 1785 she was granted a Government pension of £300 a year, to alleviate the family's permanent financial woes.

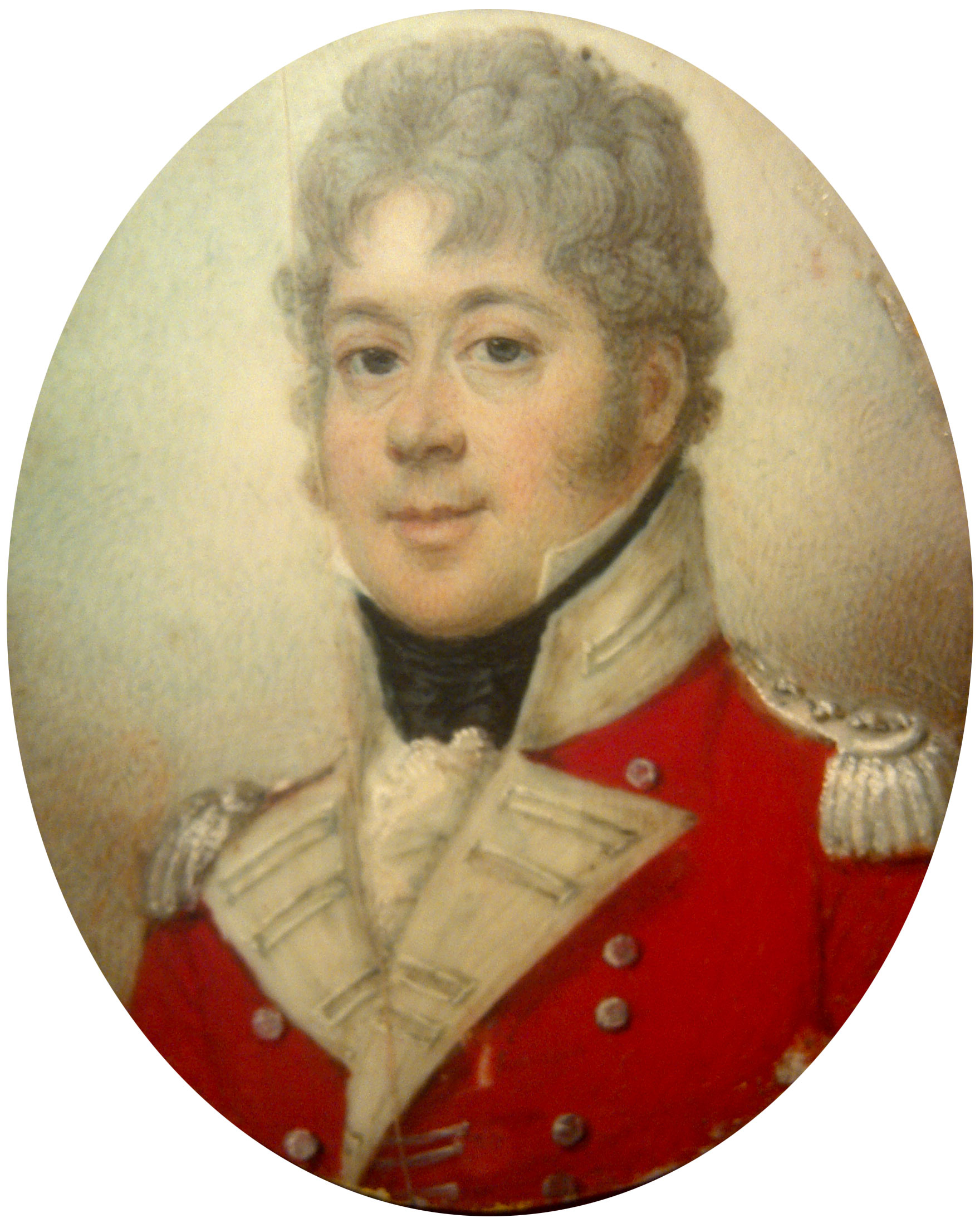
Colonel Hugh Mitchell, the distinguished Army officer, a nephew of Coppinger's wife

== Sources ==
- Coppinger, W. A. History of the Coppinger or Copinger family of County Cork London Sotheron 1884
- Hart, A.R. History of the King's Serjeant-at-law in Ireland Four Courtd Press Dublin 2000
- Journal of the House of Commons of the Kingdom of Ireland
- Parliamentary Register, or the History of the Proceedings and Debates in the House of Commons of Ireland
- Smyth, Constantine Joseph Chronicle of the Law Officers of Ireland Butterworths London 1839
