= Joseph (Dean of Armagh) =

Joseph appears as Dean of Armagh in 1257.
