= Robert Hamilton (priest) =

Robert Smyly Greer Hamilton (b Castle Caulfield – d Armagh 1928) was Dean of Armagh from 1924 until his death.

Hamilton was educated at Trinity College, Dublin;and ordained in 1885. He began his career with curacies at Urney and Six Mile Cross. He was the Incumbent of Derryloran from 1896 to 1905; and of Dundalk from 1905 to 1924.

There is a memorial to him in the north aisle at his cathedral.

Church of Ireland titles
Preceded by Francis George le Poer McClintock	Dean of Armagh; 1924–1928	Succeeded by Ford Tichborne
