= Denis O'Cullean =

Dean of Armagh, Ireland (15th century)

Denis O'Cullean (some sources O'Culean) was appointed Dean of Armagh in 1416 and is recorded still in post in 1441.
