= Christopher O'Fearghila =

14th-century dean of Armagh

Christopher O'Fearghila was appointed Dean of Armagh in 1334. He died in 1362.
