= James Jackson (priest) =

James Edward Jackson (b Hatton Garden 9 December 1778 – d Paris 19 August 1841) was an Anglican priest in the middle of the 19th century, most notably he was Dean of Armagh from 1830 until his death.

Jackson was educated at Lincoln College, Oxford, matriculating in 1797, and graduating B.A. in 1801. He was Assistant Minister at the Curzon Chapel then Vicar of Ardee. He was Prebendary of Tynan in Armagh Cathedral from 1826 to 1830.

Church of Ireland titles
Preceded by James Hewitt	Dean of Armagh; 1830–1841	Succeeded by Edward Gustavus Hudson
