= Edmund Nachamayl =

Edmund Nachamayl (some sources N'Camail) was a long serving Dean of Armagh: he was in post from 1505 until his death on 21 January 1549.
