= Glenville, County Cork =

Village in County Cork, Ireland

Glenville Gleann an Phréacháin
- Village
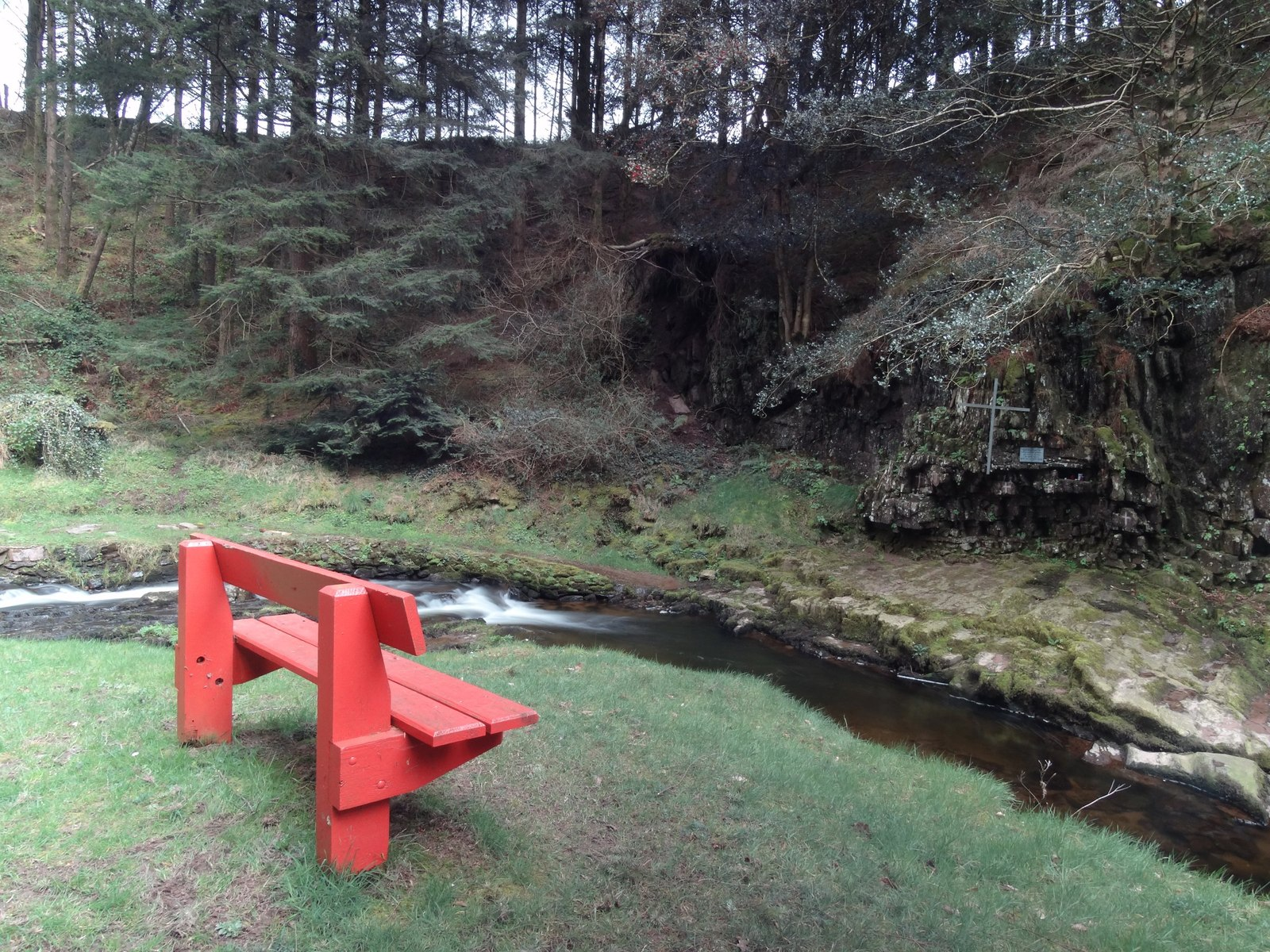
- A mass rock to the northwest of Glenville was used during the time of the Penal Laws

- Location in Ireland
- Coordinates: 52.045°N 8.426°W
- Country: Ireland
- Province: Munster
- County: County Cork

Population (2022)
  - Total: 501

Glenville (Irish: Gleann an Phréacháin) is a village and townland in County Cork, Ireland. It is situated approximately 20 km (12 mi) northeast of Cork city. Glenville is in the Dáil constituency of Cork North-Central.

== Geography ==
Glenville village lies in a townland of the same name, in the civil parish of Ardnageehy.

This area contains some unique habitats, flora and fauna, including the Small Cudweed and the Sand Martin, a migratory species that return from North Africa each spring to breed in the porous sand cliffs along sections of the river valley. These endangered species have been the subject of an EU investigation, whereby the planning authorities and the Irish government were held to account in breach of various EU Bird and Habitats Directives.

== History and built heritage ==
Glenville contains a number of sites of historical interest including a famine walk and a mass rock dating to penal times.

The Owenbawn River, which flows through the village to the south, is spanned by a bridge which dates to the 1790s. The local Church of Ireland church, St. Mary's Ardnageehy, dates from the same period. The village's Roman Catholic church is dedicated to Saint Joseph and was built c.1890.

A large manor house and estate, known locally as "The Manor" was built in the late 19th century on the site of a former 18th-century house. This estate, originally a Coppinger property, was sold to the Hudson family in the early 1770s. The Hudsons built a new house and this house was added to in 1887. E. G. Hudson was a resident at Glenville in 1814 and Samuel Lewis records the Reverend E. G. Hudson as the proprietor of Mount Pleasant in the parish of Ardnageehy in 1837. In the mid-19th century William E. Hudson held the property valued at £46 in fee. Inherited by William E. Hudson's nephew Sir Edward Hudson Kinahan who was the occupier in 1906 when the house was valued at £150. Sold to the Bence Jones family in 1949. Also known as Mount Prospect and The Manor, this house was the home of the author Mark Bence-Jones.

== People ==
- Maurice Coppinger (1727-1802), politician and barrister, inherited Glenville from his father in 1752, but sold it in the 1770s to pay the costs of a lawsuit.
- Dr Edward Hudson, an early dental practitioner, who bought the main estate which was used as his family's summer residence.
- Reverend Edward Gustavus Hudson (1791-1851), Dean of Armagh from 1841. Eldest son of Dr. Edward Hudson.
- Mark Bence-Jones inherited the Glenville Manor House from his parents and lived there from time to time until his death in 2010. The property now belongs to his daughter.

== See also ==
- Hudson-Kinahan baronets
