= Ed Hinton =

Ed Hinton may refer to:

- Ed Hinton (sportswriter) (1948–2025), American motorsports columnist
- Ed Hinton (actor) (1919–1958), American actor
