= Thomas McEndoo =

Northern Irish dean

Thomas James McEndoo was Dean of Armagh from 1938 to 1955.

Hamilton was educated at Trinity College, Dublin and was ordained in 1888. After a curacy in Ballymore, he held incumbencies at Donaghendry and Drumglass. He was Prebendary of Mullaghbrack in Armagh Cathedral from 1915 to 1925; Treasurer from 1925 to 1927 and Precentor from 1927 to 1938.

Church of Ireland titles
Preceded by Ford Tichborne	Dean of Armagh; 1938–1955	Succeeded by Henry West Rennison
