= Augustine FitzGerald (priest) =

Irish Anglican priest

Augustine FitzGerald, D.D. (21 December 1826 – 2 January 1900) was Dean of Armagh from 1896 until his death.

FitzGerald was educated at Trinity College, Dublin and ordained in 1852. He began his career with curacies at Stillorgan and Moneymore. He was Perpetual curate of Portadown from 1859 to 1896. He was Precentor of Armagh Cathedral from 1886 to 1896.

Church of Ireland titles
Preceded by George Alexander Chadwick	Dean of Armagh; 1900–1908	Succeeded by Robert James Shaw-Hamilton
