= Lockett Ford =

Irish Anglican clergyman

(Abraham) Lockett Ford (3 April 1853, in Newry – 16 April 1945, in Ardee) was an Irish Anglican clergyman.

Irwin was educated at the Royal Institution School, Liverpool and Trinity College, Oxford. He was ordained deacon in 1876 and priest in 1878. He was an Assistant Master at his old school then Curate at Dundalk. He was Rector of Camlough from 1878 to 1893; and then of Ardee. He was Rural Dean of Athirdee from 1900 until 1925, and then of Drogheda until 1934. Ford became Archdeacon of Armagh in 1934; and held the post until his death. He was additionally Chaplain to the last four Lords Lieutenant of Ireland.

== Arms ==
Coat of arms of Lockett Ford

Notes
Granted 20 September 1916 by George James Burtchaell, Deputy Ulster King of Arms.
Crest
Issuant from a barrulet couped Or a greyhound's head Sable.
Torse
Of the colours.
Escutcheon
Per fess Or and Ermine a greyhound courant Sable on a canton Azure a cross moline of the first.
Motto
Ne Cede Malis
