= Herbert Cassidy =

Irish Anglican dean (1935–2013)

Herbert Cassidy (25 July 1935 – 10 April 2013) was Dean of Armagh from 1989 to 2006.

Herbert was educated at Cork Grammar School and Trinity College, Dublin. He was ordained in 1958. After curacies in Belfast and Derry he held incumbencies at Aghavilly (1962–1965) and Portadown (1965–1985). He was Dean of Kilmore from 1985 to 1989.

Church of Ireland titles
Preceded by John Robert Megaw Crooks	Dean of Armagh; 1989–2006	Succeeded by Patrick William Rooke
