= Frank Higgins =

Frank Higgins may refer to:

- Frank E. Higgins (1865–1915), Canadian evangelist
- Frank G. Higgins (1864–1905), Montana politician
- Frank W. Higgins (1856–1907), New York politician

== See also ==
- Francis Higgins (disambiguation)
