= David O'Hiraghty =

Dean and Archbishop of Armagh

David O'Hiraghty was a 14th-century Irish bishop. He was appointed Dean of Armagh in 1330 and served until 1334; and was Archbishop of Armagh from his Consecration at Avignon until his death on 16 May 1346.
