= George Makeston =

Former Dean of Armagh

George Makeston was an Irish dean in the first half of the 16th century.

A Scotsman, he was Dean of Armagh from 1622 until his death at Legacorry in 1635.
