= Henry Rennison =

Former Dean of Armagh

Henry West Rennison was Dean of Armagh from 1955 to 1965.

Rennison was the son of Rev. H. Rennison, Chancellor of Ferns. Rennison was educated at Trinity College, Dublin and was ordained in 1911. After curacies in Desertcreat and Drumcree he became the incumbent at Ballymascanlan in 1929.

Church of Ireland titles
Preceded by Thomas James McEndoo	Dean of Armagh; 1955–1965	Succeeded by Alexander Lillee
