= Anthony Cope (Dean of Armagh) =

Irish dean (1713–1764)

Anthony Cope (1713–1764) was Dean of Armagh from 1753 until his death.

Cope was born in Loughgall and educated at Trinity College, Dublin. He was Rector of Tartaraghan from 1739 until his death in April 1764.

== Family ==
He was the son of Robert Cope and the uncle of Robert Camden Cope.

== See also ==
- Cope family

Church of Ireland titles
Preceded by John Auchmuty	Dean of Armagh; 1753–1764	Succeeded by Benjamin Barrington
