= Edward Coppinger =

English cricketer

Edward Thomas Coppinger (25 November 1846 – 26 February 1927) was an English cricketer who played for Kent County Cricket Club in 1873.

Coppinger was born at Bexley in Kent in 1846, the son of Edward and Mildred Coppinger. His father was a publican and came from a cricketing family. Coppinger played club cricket in Essex and Metropolitan Kent, including as a wicket-keeper for Blackheath against the touring Australian Aboriginals in 1868. He played twice for Kent in first-class cricket, both matches coming in August 1873. On his debut for the county against Surrey at The Oval he took a five-wicket haul, taking five wickets for 29 runs in Surrey's second innings. This was the only innings in which be bowled in first-class cricket.

Like his father Coppinger was a pub landlord, first in Lewisham before taking over his father's pub at New Cross. He later set up business as a spirit merchant and distiller at Kingston-upon-Thames. He became a local councillor and Justice of the Peace and served as mayor of Kingston in 1890/91. He married Emily Hutchinson in 1870; the couple had five children. Coppinger died at his home at Surbiton in 1927 at the age of 80. Two of his brothers, Charles and William, and an uncle Septimus all played first-class cricket.

== Bibliography ==
- Carlaw, Derek (2020). Kent County Cricketers, A to Z: Part One (1806–1914) (PDF). Cardiff: ACS.
