= Henry Lillee =

Dean of Armagh

Henry Alexander Lillie (11 May 1911 – 8 January 1986) was Dean of Armagh from 1965 to 1979.

Hamilton was educated at Sligo Grammar School and Trinity College, Dublin. After four years as a schoolmaster he was ordained in 1936. After a curacy in Portadown, he held incumbencies at Milltown (1941–1947), Kilmore (1947–1952) and Armagh (1952–1965). He was Prebendary of Tynan in Armagh Cathedral from 1952 to 1960, Treasurer from 1960 to 1961, Chancellor in 1961, and Precentor from 1961 to 1965.

Church of Ireland titles
Preceded by Henry West Rennison	Dean of Armagh; 1965–1979	Succeeded by John Robert Megaw Crooks
