= Robert Shaw-Hamilton =

Robert James Shaw-Hamilton (b Kilmactraney 1840 - d Killiney 1908) was Dean of Armagh from 1900 until his death.

Shaw-Hamilton was educated at Trinity College, Dublin and ordained in 1879. He began his career at Aghavea. He was Rector of Drumcar from 1873 until 1886, then Rector of Tynan from 1886 until 1900. He was announced as the new dean of St Patrick's Cathedral, Armagh, in early April 1900.

He died on 19 July 1908; and there is a memorial to him in the north aisle at his cathedral.

Church of Ireland titles
| Preceded by Augustine FitzGerald | Dean of Armagh; 1900–1908 | Succeeded by Francis George le Poer McClintock |
