= Robert Maxwell (priest) =

Irish dean

Robert Maxwell was an Irish dean in the middle of the 17th century.

A Scotsman, he was Dean of Armagh from 1610 until his death in 1622. His son Robert Maxwell was Bishop of Kilmore and Ardagh.
