= Henry de Ardagh =

Henry de Ardagh was appointed Dean of Armagh in 1262 and served until 1272.
