= Charles O'Niellan =

Charles O'Niellan (some sources O’Mellan) was appointed Dean of Armagh in 1443 and served until 1475.
