= Thomas O'Luceran =

Thomas O'Luceran (some sources O’Lucheran), a Canon of Armagh since 1397, was appointed Dean of Armagh in 1406, and was deprived in1414.
