= Peter Ó Maolmhuaidh =

Peter Ó Maolmhuaidh was appointed Dean of Armagh in 1487 and deprived in 1492. At some point he was restored and died in 1505.
