= Ted Hinton (footballer) =

Northern Ireland footballer

Personal information
- Full name: Edward Hinton
- Date of birth: 20 May 1922
- Place of birth: Drumaness, Northern Ireland
- Date of death: 11 October 1988 (aged 66)
- Place of death: Belfast, Northern Ireland
- Height: 6 ft 0 in (1.83 m)
- Position: Goalkeeper

Senior career*
Years	Team	Apps	(Gls)
1939–1943	Glentoran	43	(0)
1943–1946	Distillery		
1946–1949	Fulham	82	(0)
1949–1952	Millwall	91	(0)
1952–1953	Ballymena United		
1953–1956	Bangor		
1956–1959	Ballymena United		
Total		216	(0)

International career
1946–1951	Northern Ireland	7	(0)
- * Club domestic league appearances and goals

Edward Hinton (20 May 1922 – 11 October 1988) was a Northern Irish international footballer who played as a goalkeeper in the Football League. He was famed for keeping his false teeth in the back of his net when he played.
