= Clonca Church & Cross =

Historic monument in County Donegal, Ireland

Clonca Church & Cross is a historic monument located in Inishowen, County Donegal. It is one of the most important and popular historical sites in Inishowen. At 54°43′05″N it is the northernmost of Ireland's National Monuments.

== History ==
The site occupies level ground on the edge of the valley floor of the Gleneely River. Erenaghs (lay Stewards) are recorded as being on the site in the early 17th Century. The 17th or 18th century Church of Ireland stands on the site of an earlier monastic site and enclosure, likely founded around the 6th century by St. Baudan. The lintel over this later church doorway - with worn carvings of ecclesiastics - is part of an older church. Inside lies the tombstone of Magnus MacOrristin, probably a Scotsman from the Hebrides. In the field opposite the entrance to the church are two crosses: the upright (high) cross has both panels carved with interlace and figurative scenes: two lions and two individuals thought to be St. Paul and St. Anthony with the scenes thought to depict the Miracle of the loaves and fishes, and other less identifiable scenes. To the north-west of the upright cross are the remnants of the ringed head of another (high) cross (a piece of cross-arm stored in the church is thought to be a fragment of this second feature).

In 2013, an archaeological geophysical (magnetometer) survey was undertaken at the site and the surrounding fields which recorded a double ditch circular boundary surrounding the graveyard with the standing high cross within and part of the complex. "On its south and east sides, the graveyard appears to once have occupied a more extensive area. In an arc around the graveyard from the north, to the west and south-west sides, at the edge of the plateau of land where the downslope to the valley floor begins, are the outlines of a double circle with diameters of some 80m and 95m. This looks like a precinct similar to that at Carrowmore, but in a much more complex landscape setting." The findings from the survey work have suggested that there is a deeper timeframe for occupation at Clonca, perhaps as a precursor to the ecclesiastical establishment. In scale and outline structure both the Carrowmore and Clonca complexes are comparable with, for example, the combined inner and middle enclosures of Nendrum as they survive in their visible stone-walled form.

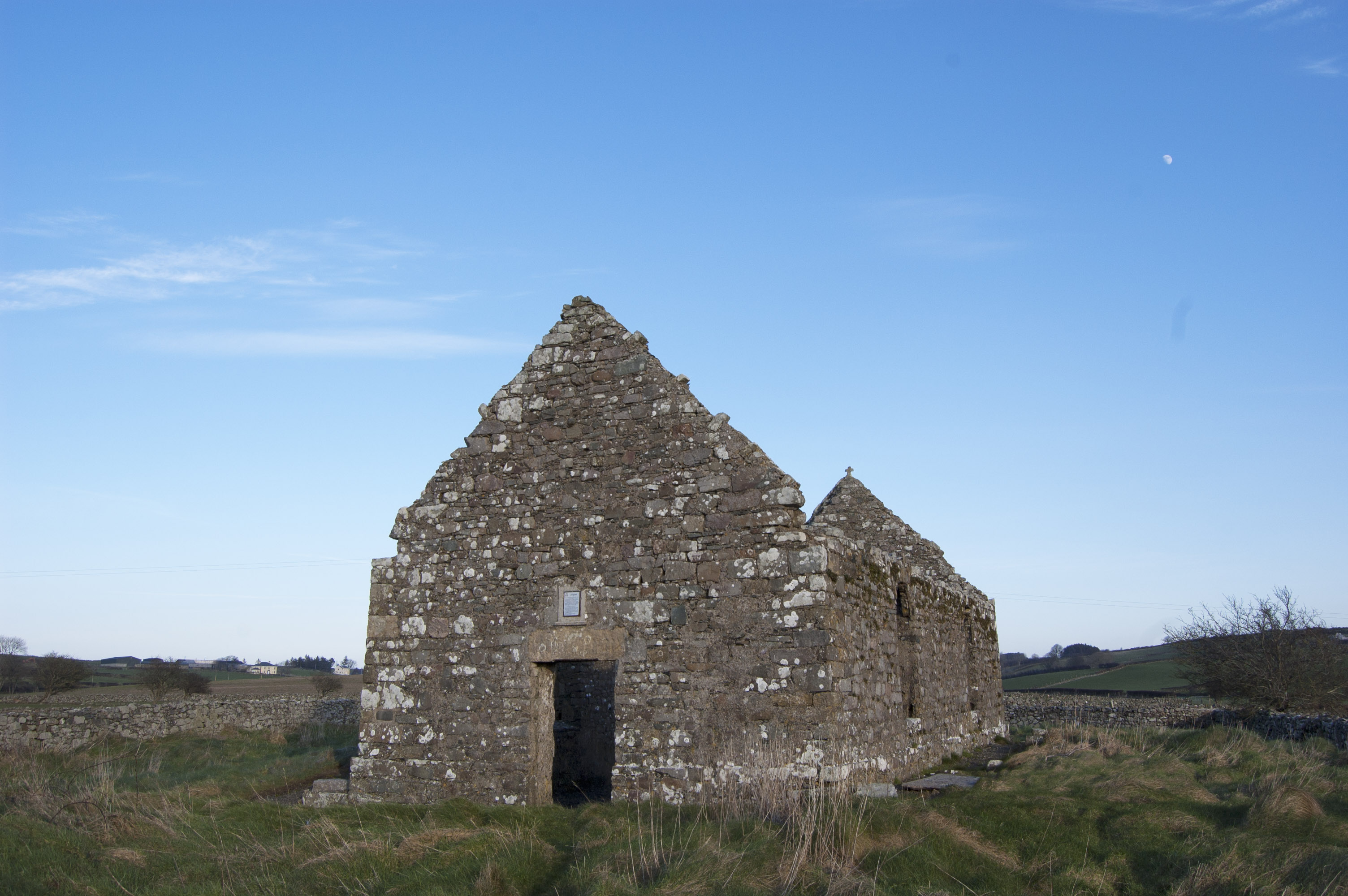

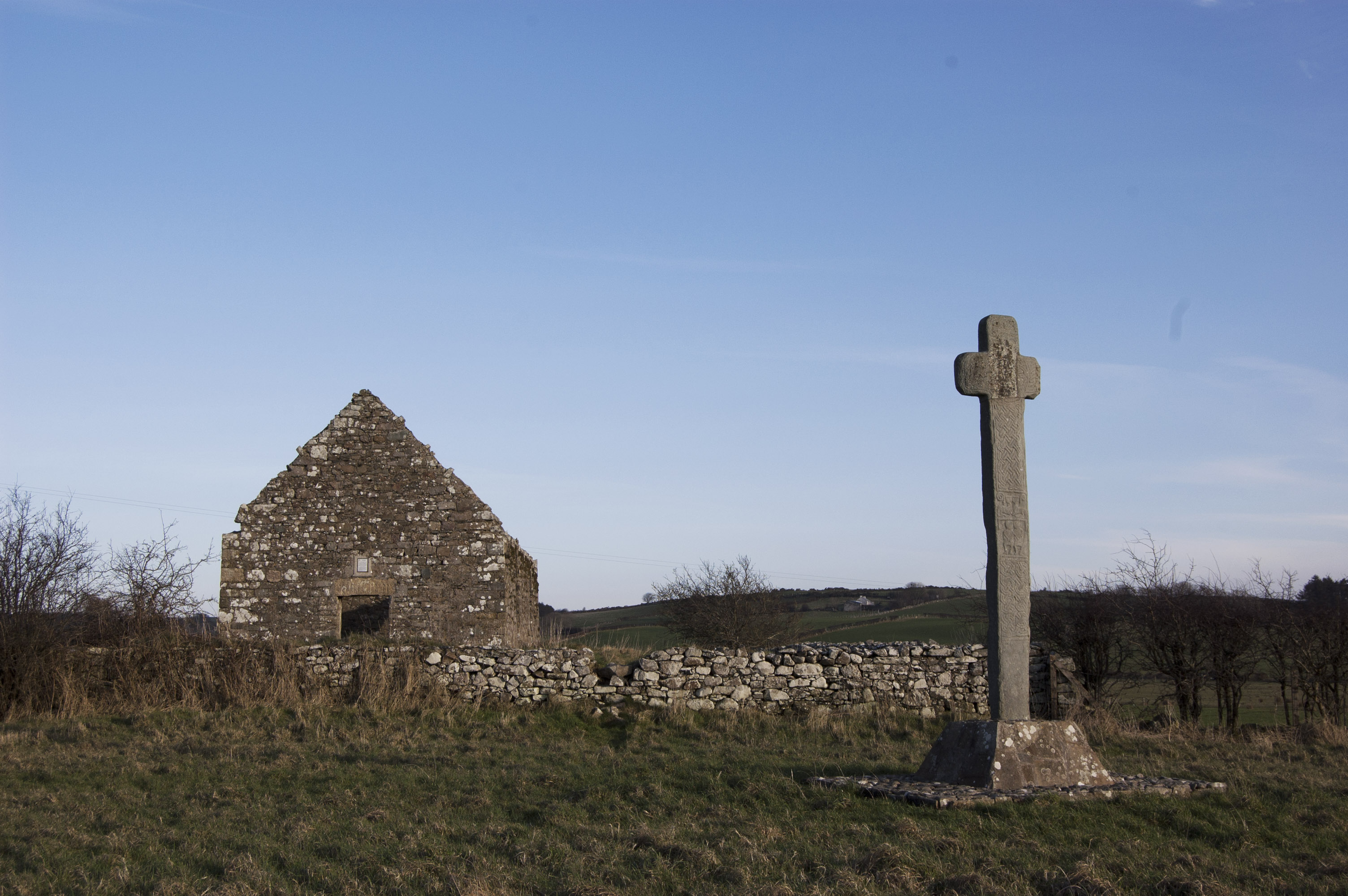

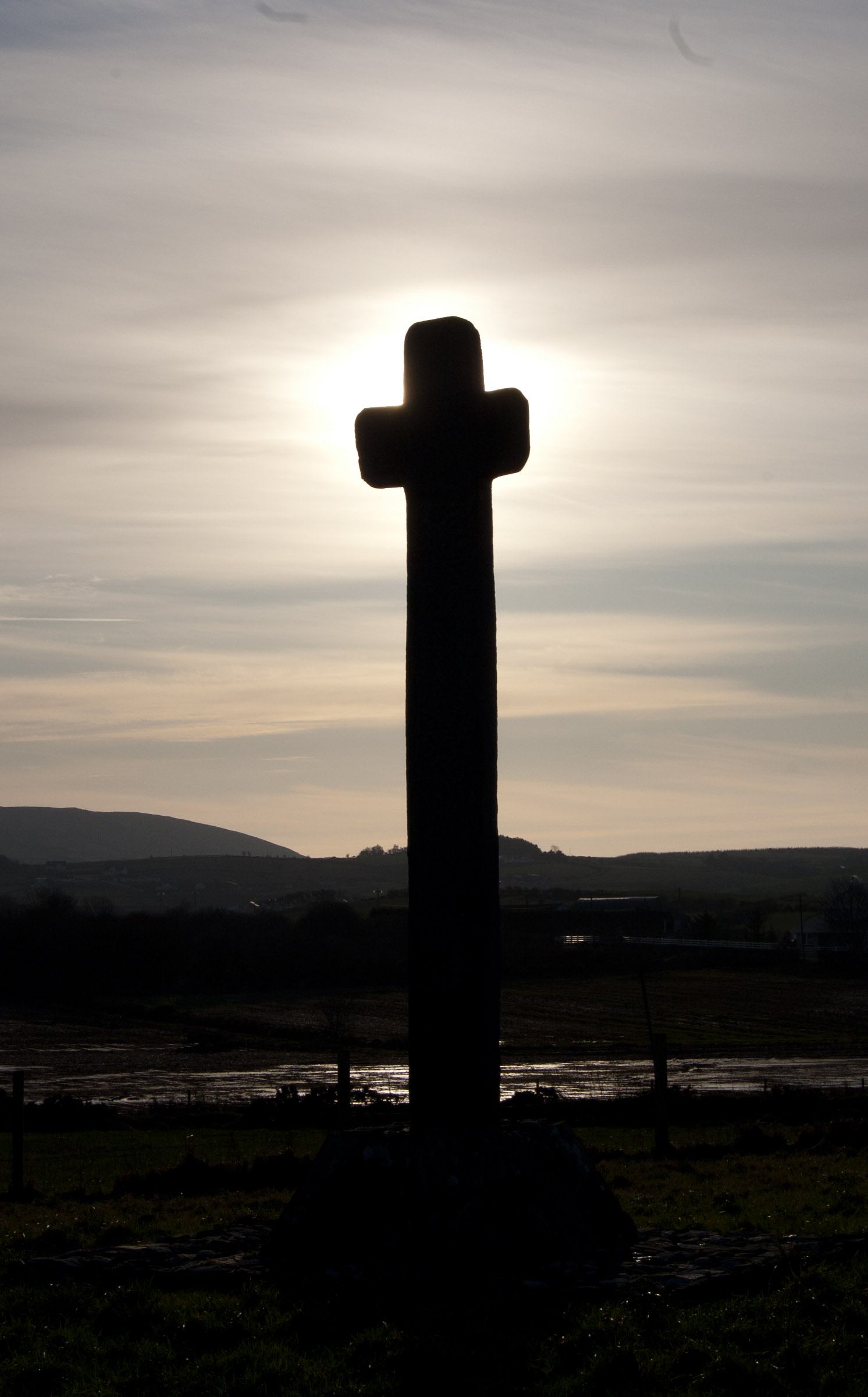

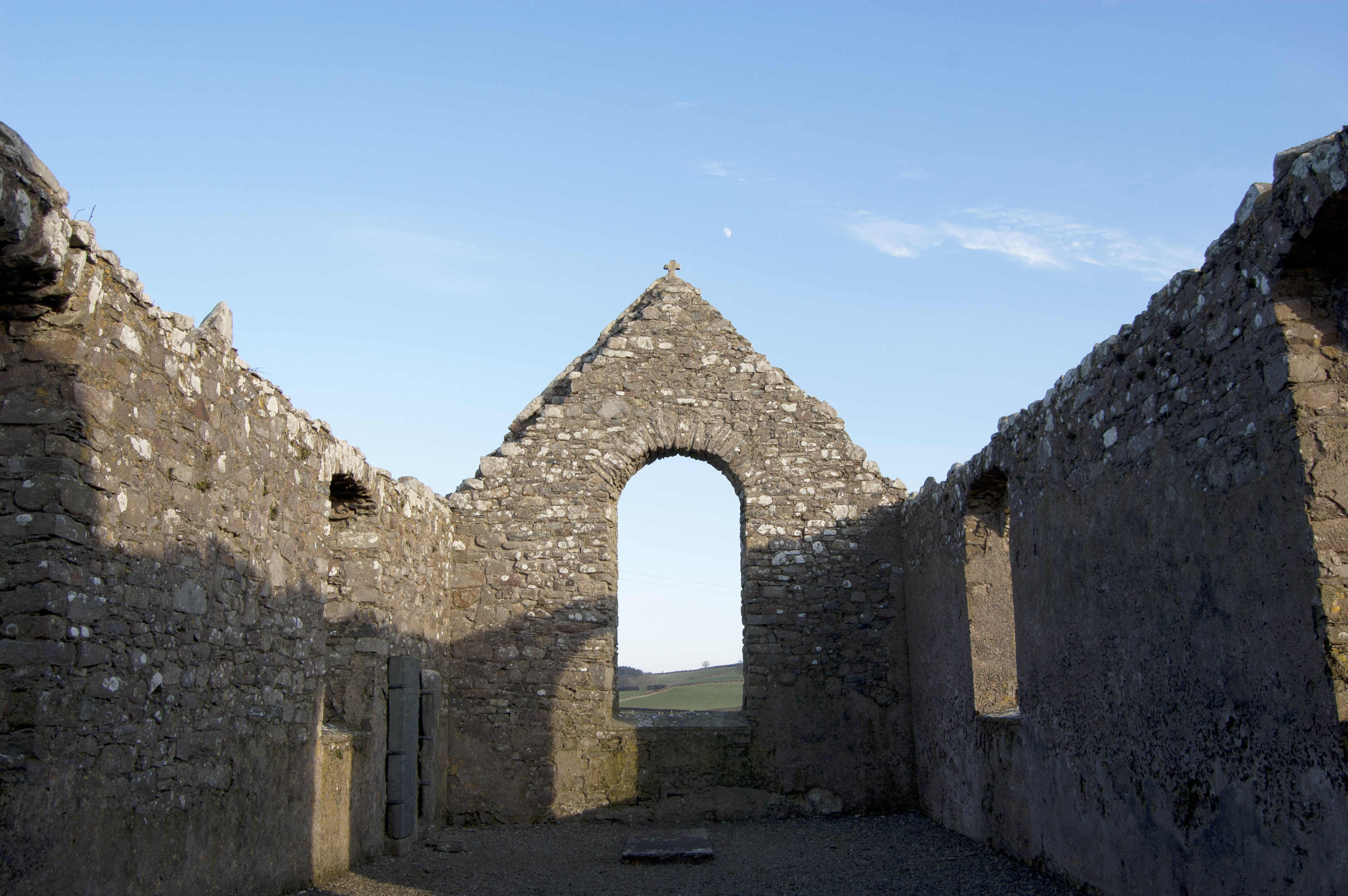

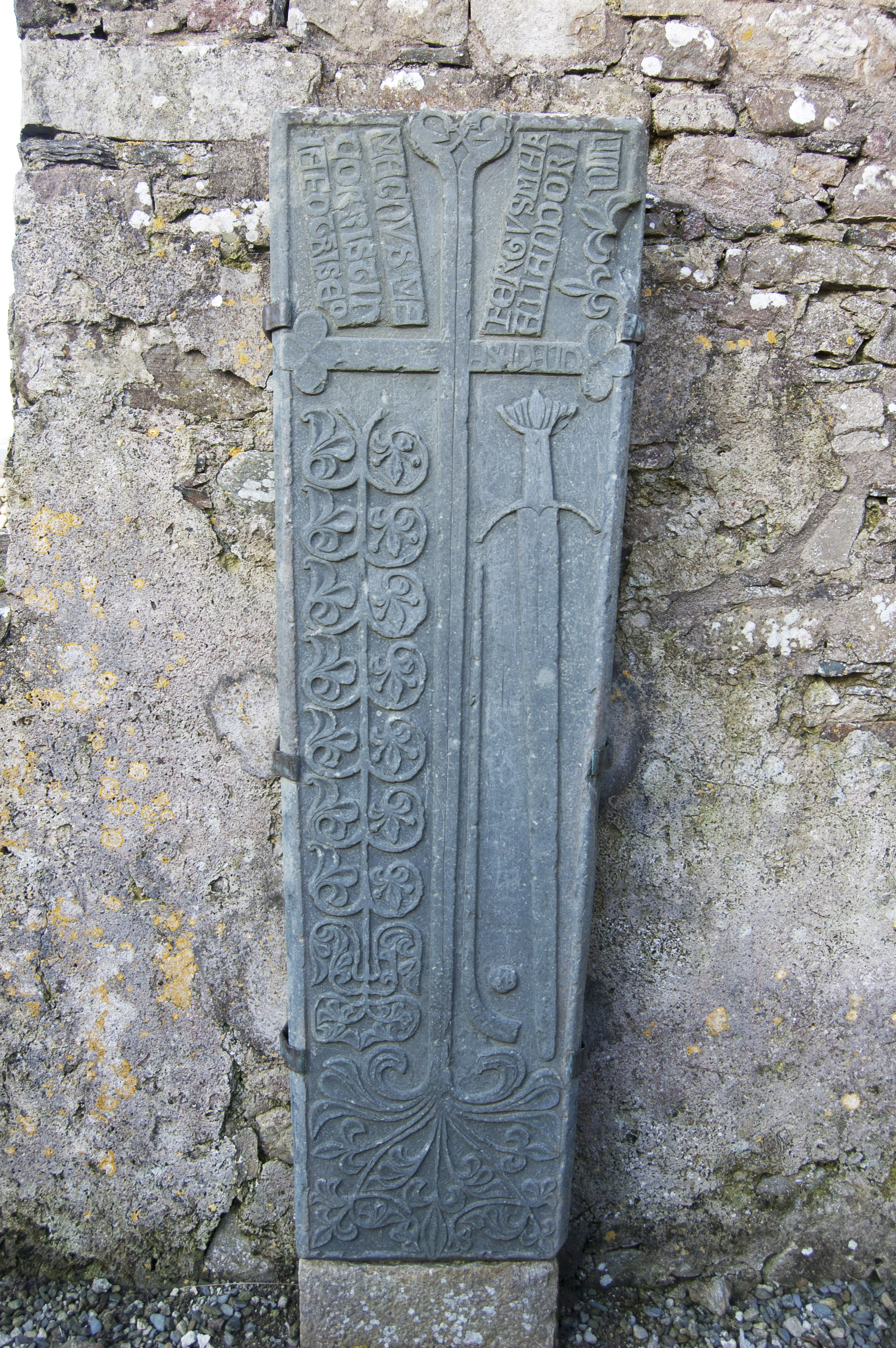

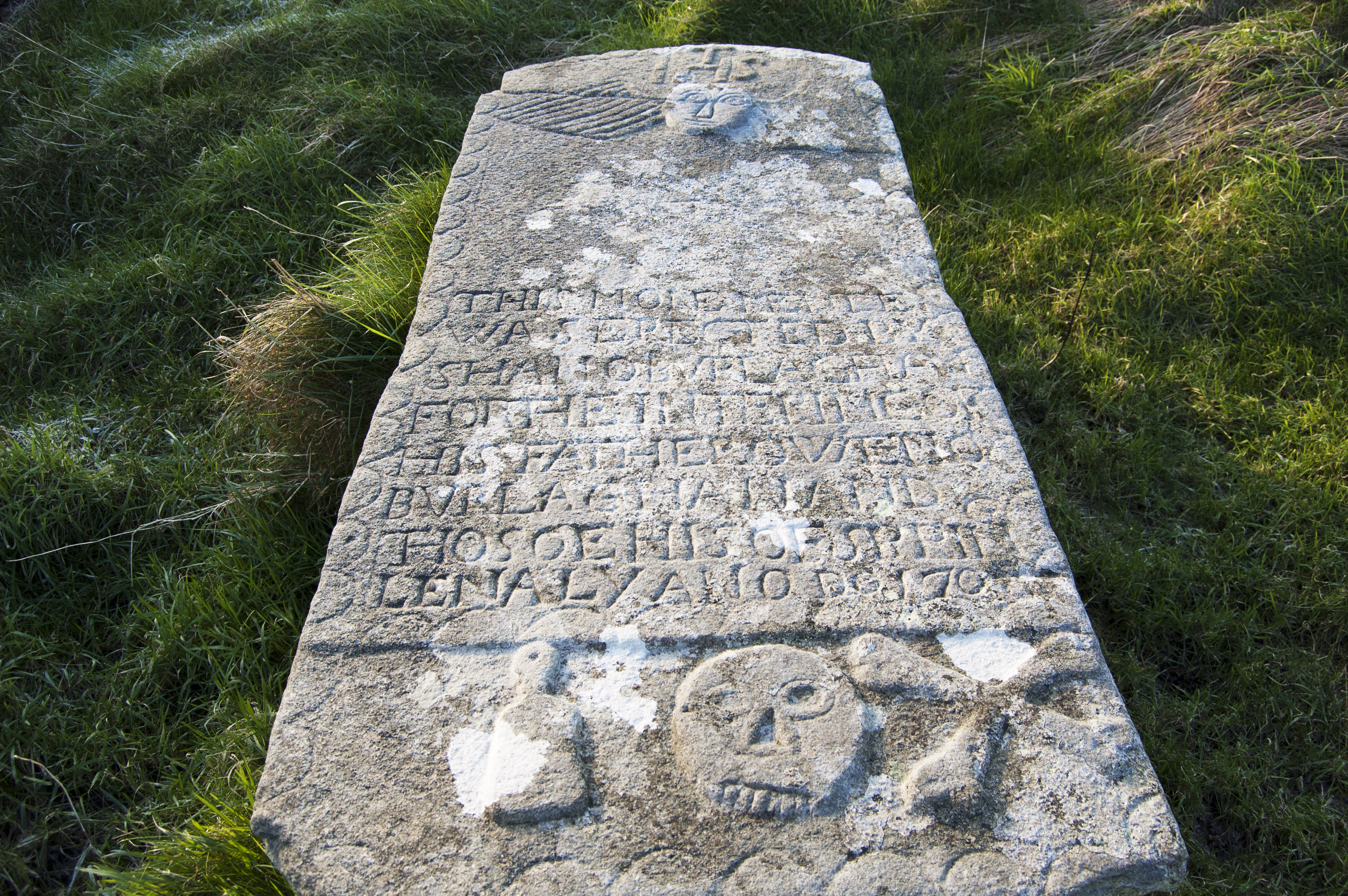
