= Inishmot =

Civil parish in County Meath, Ireland

Coordinates: 53°42′N 6°36′W

Inishmot (Irish: Inis Mochta) is a civil parish in County Meath, Ireland.
