= John Brandreth =

Irish dean

John Brandreth was an Irish dean in the middle of the 18th century.

A former Archdeacon of Killaloe and Dean of Armagh (1731–1736), Brandreth was Dean of Emly from 1736 until 1765.
