= Mauritius (Dean of Armagh) =

Mauritius (sometimes Mascus) appears as Dean of Armagh in 1238, the second recorded incumbent.
