= Mike Coppinger =

Boxing journalist

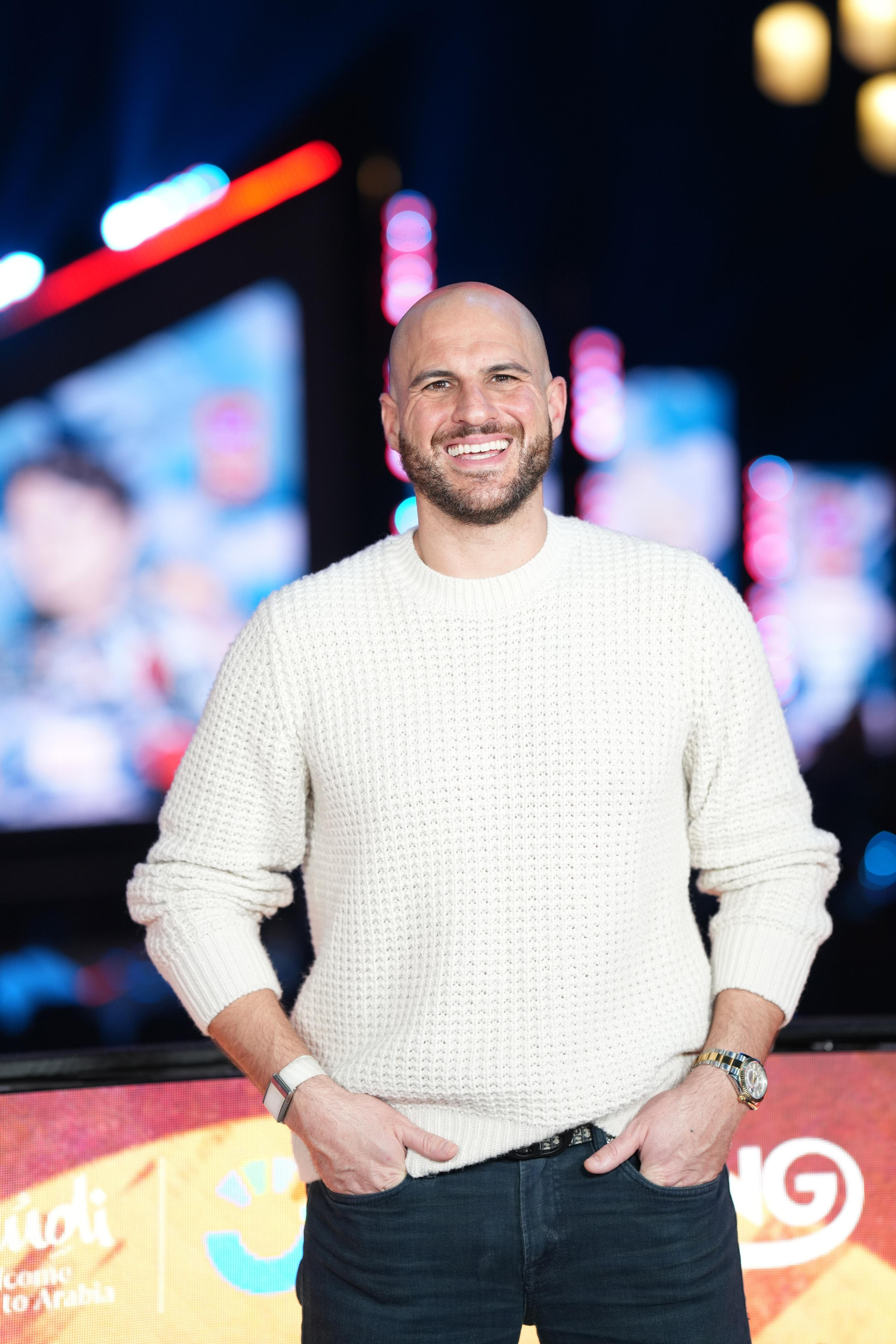
- Mike Coppinger, Senior Insider at The Ring
- Occupations: Sports journalist, boxing analyst
- Years active: 2010–present
- Employer(s): The Ring Magazine, DAZN
- Awards: BWAA First Place: Investigative Reporting (2019); BWAA First Place: News Story (2019)

Mike Coppinger is an American boxing journalist and Senior Insider for The Ring Magazine. He is a co-host of the program Inside The Ring on DAZN alongside Max Kellerman. He is an elector for the International Boxing Hall of Fame and a recipient of multiple Boxing Writers Association of America (BWAA) Bernie Awards. He was previously the lead boxing reporter for ESPN from 2021 to 2025.

== Career ==
=== Early career (2010–2019) ===
Coppinger studied journalism at George Mason University. He began his career covering boxing as a freelancer for USA Today in 2010, reporting on events from ringside. He served as the publication's lead boxing writer from 2015 to 2017 before moving to The Ring as lead boxing reporter until 2019.

=== Fox Sports (2018–2019) ===
From 2018 to 2019, Coppinger served as a featured insider and analyst for the Fox studio program Inside PBC Boxing. He appeared on the weekly show alongside host Kate Abdo and former world champions Shawn Porter and Abner Mares.

=== The Athletic and digital media (2019–2020) ===
In 2019, Coppinger joined The Athletic as a senior boxing writer. During this period, he co-hosted The Pug and Copp Boxing Show with Lance Pugmire and provided news and analysis regarding boxing and mixed martial arts across multiple digital media platforms.

=== ESPN (2021–2025) ===
Coppinger joined ESPN as a boxing reporter and analyst in July 2021. During his tenure, he served as a regular analyst for the ESPN+ program State of Boxing, co-hosting the weekly show alongside Timothy Bradley Jr. and Bernardo Osuna from 2021 to 2025. In October 2023, he signed a multi-year contract extension with the network to continue his role as a lead boxing insider.

=== The Ring and DAZN (2025–present) ===
Coppinger returned to The Ring in April 2025 as Senior Insider and broadcast contributor. In September 2025, he began co-hosting the weekly studio show Inside The Ring on DAZN alongside Max Kellerman, and served as a desk analyst for the global Netflix broadcast of Saul "Canelo" Álvarez vs. Terence Crawford. In January 2026, Coppinger joined the broadcast team for the inaugural events of Zuffa Boxing, serving as a studio desk analyst alongside Molly Qerim and Antonio Tarver for the venture's debut on Paramount+.

In addition to his studio work, Coppinger transitioned into a primary ringside role for The Ring's live event series on DAZN throughout 2025. In May, he served as a color commentator for the publication's outdoor event in Times Square, working alongside Jim Lampley and Antonio Tarver. He continued providing ringside analysis for The Ring III at Louis Armstrong Stadium in July, and later served as an analyst in Riyadh for The Ring IV: Night of Champions in November and The Ring V: Night of the Samurai in December, working the broadcast and press events alongside Claudia Trejos and Sergio Mora.

== Media coverage ==
In October 2021, Coppinger was involved in a public dispute with Top Rank chairman Bob Arum during a media event. In June 2022, Floyd Mayweather Jr. publicly challenged reporting by Coppinger regarding the scheduling of an Errol Spence Jr. vs. Terence Crawford bout.

In July 2023, Coppinger was denied credentials to cover the Spence–Crawford fight by Premier Boxing Champions (PBC). The organization did not provide a public reason for the denial, which was reported by several sports media outlets.

== Awards and recognition ==
Coppinger has received multiple honors from the Boxing Writers Association of America. In 2019, he won First Place in both the "Investigative Reporting" and "News Story" categories. In 2021, he received Third Place for "Event Coverage" for his reporting on Manny Pacquiao and an Honorable Mention for Investigative Reporting. In addition to his writing awards, Coppinger is an elector for the International Boxing Hall of Fame.
