= Richard Daniel (priest) =

Irish Anglican priest

The Ven. Richard Daniel (9 July 1681 – 30 April 1739) was a Church of Ireland priest in the first half of the 18th century.

Gore was born in Dublin and educated at Trinity College there. He was Archdeacon of Killaloe from 1714 to 1731; Dean of Armagh from 1722 until 1731. and Dean of Down from 1731 until his death.
