= Shane Forster =

Northern Ireland Anglican priest

Thomas Shane Forster (born 1972) is a Northern Irish Anglican priest. Since February 2021, he has been Dean of Armagh, the senior priest of St Patrick's Cathedral, Armagh and the Church of Ireland's Diocese of Armagh.

== Early life and education ==
Forster was born in Belfast, Northern Ireland in 1971. He was educated at Downey House Preparatory and the Methodist College, a grammar school in Belfast. He studied at Queen's University Belfast, graduating with a Bachelor of Arts (BA) degree in 1993. He trained for ordination at the Church of Ireland Theological College and studied at Trinity College Dublin, graduating with a Bachelor of Theology (BTh) degree in 1996. He later continued his studies and graduated from Trinity College Dublin with a Master of Philosophy (MPhil) degree in 2005.

== Ordained ministry ==
Forster was ordained in the Church of Ireland as a deacon in 1996 and as a priest in 1997. He was ordained to the priesthood during a service at St Patrick's Cathedral, Armagh. He served his curacy in Drumglass Parish, Dungannon, County Tyrone from 1996 to 1999. He was additionally appointed domestic chaplain to the Archbishop of Armagh in 1997: he has served as chaplain to four successive archbishops. Having completed his curacy, in 1999, he was appointed rector of the parochial group of Donaghmore and Donaghmore Upper. In 2006, he moved parishes and became rector of St Mark's Church, Ballymore in Tandragee, County Armagh. He was additionally made a canon of St Patrick's Cathedral, Dublin.

In December 2020, it was announced that Forster would be the next dean of St Patrick's Cathedral, Armagh. He was conferred as Dean of Armagh on 14 February 2021 during a service held on Zoom due to the COVID-19 pandemic. He was installed at the cathedral during a service on 12 September 2021.
