= Coppinger's Court =

Ruined house in County Cork, Ireland

Coordinates: 51°34′16″N 09°4′2″W

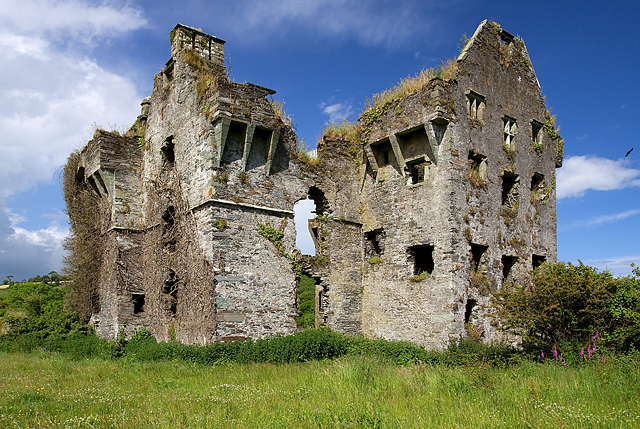
Coppingers Court

Coppingers Court is a ruined four-storey fortified house dating from 1616, situated on private property approximately 1 kilometre (0.6 mi) from the sea. It was built by Sir Walter Coppinger and located in Ballyvireen valley, west of Rosscarbery in County Cork, Ireland. The house has a rectangular centre flanked by two wings on the east and west, resulting in a total of 9 gables.

== History ==
Sir Walter acquired the valley and surrounding lands from the previous owner, Fineen O'Driscoll, by foreclosing on a mortgage after advancing him a sum of money. The house was originally known as "Ballyverine Castle", and Sir Walter's original plans included transforming the immediate area into a market town, with the nearby Rowry river converted to a canal in order to navigate from nearby Milcove to his new town. Sir Walter died in 1639 and is buried in Christ Church, Cork. His surviving plans came to an end when the house was attacked during the Irish Rebellion of 1641 and badly damaged by fire. Despite having a number of sons, Sir Walter's brother, Dominic, took possession of his property. It was never restored and fell into ruins over the following years. It was purchased by Thomas Beecher in 1698, and later held by Henry Beecher. It is not mentioned in Griffith's Valuation in the mid-nineteenth century, when the surrounding land was leased by the Carbery estate.

== Description ==
Coppinger's Court is built in the Elizabethan style, as was fashionable in Ireland in the 17th century. Older style fortified towers and castles gave way to more comfortable, warmer and better-lit fortified houses with innovations such as wooden stairs, better lighting and more rooms. After the rebellion in 1641 when a number of these newer style houses were burned and destroyed, their popularity waned. At the time, Coppinger Court was said to be one of the finest examples of fortified house in its day, and was said to have "a chimney for every month, a door for every week and a window for every day of the year".
