= Francis Higgins (soccer) =

American soccer goalkeeper

Personal information
- Position: Goalkeeper

Senior career*
Years	Team	Apps	(Gls)
- Fall River Rovers
1922–1923	Fall River F.C.	14	(0)
1925–1926	New Bedford Whalers	5	(0)
- * Club domestic league appearances and goals

Francis Higgins was a U.S. soccer goalkeeper who spent two seasons in the American Soccer League and an unknown number in the Southern New England Soccer League.

Higgins’ career details are sketchy. He appears to have spent most of it with teams based in Fall River, Massachusetts. In April 1920, he backstopped the Fall River Rovers of the Southern New England Soccer League in a 2–1 loss to Fore River in the 1920 National Challenge Cup semifinals. In 1922, he signed with the Fall River F.C. of the American Soccer League. That season he split time in the goal with Tommy Whalen. It is unknown what teams he played for from 1923 to 1925. In 1925, he signed with the New Bedford Whalers. He played only five games before leaving the team and league.
