= Dean of Armagh =

Dean of St Patrick's Cathedral in Ireland

The Dean of Armagh in the Church of Ireland is the dean of the Anglican St Patrick's Cathedral, the cathedral of the Diocese of Armagh and the metropolitan cathedral of the Province of Armagh, located in the town of Armagh.

Shane Forster has been the dean since 2020.

== Deans of Armagh ==
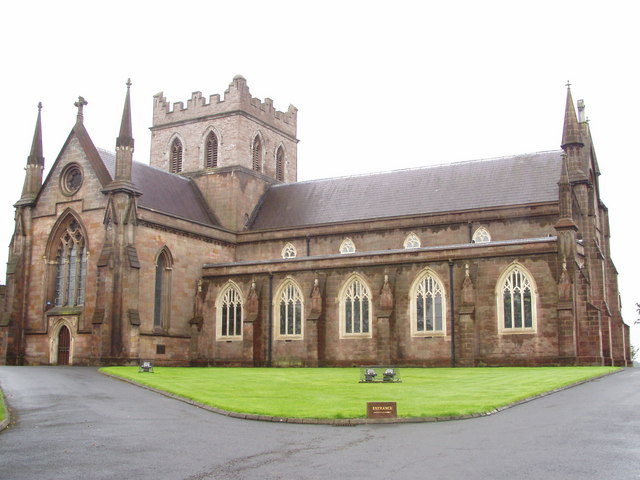
St Patrick's Cathedral, Armagh

- 1206 Richard
- 1238 Mauritius
- 1256 Joseph
- 1262–1272 Henry de Ardagh
- 1272–1301 Brice
- 1301–1330 Dionysius (or Denis)
- 1330–1334 David O'Hiraghty
- 1334–1362 Christopher O'Fearghila
- 1362 Patrick O'Kerry
- 1372 Maurice Dovey
- 1397 Maurice O'Corry (deprived 1398)
- 1398 John O'Goband
- 1406–1414 Thomas O'Luceran (deprived 1414)
- 1425–1441 Denis O'Cullean
- 1443–1474 Charles O'Niellan
- 1475-1483 Thomas M'Camail (died 1483)
- 1487–1492 Peter O'Mulmoy
- 1492–? Donald Macrivayr
- 1518–1549 Edmund M'Camail
- 1551 Terence Daniel (or Tirlagh O'Donnell)
- 1590-1609 or 1610 Eugene Woods
- 1610–1622 Robert Maxwell
- 1622 George Makeston (or Mackeson)
- 1635 James Frey
- 1636/7 Peter Wentworth (returned to England 1641 and made Archdeacon of Carlisle, 1643)
- 1643 William Sley
- 1661 Francis Marsh (afterwards Bishop of Limerick, Ardfert and Aghadoe, 1667)
- 1667–1681 James Downham
- 1681–1690 Bartholomew Vigors (afterwards Bishop of Ferns and Leighlin, 1690)
- 1690/1–1722 Peter Drelincourt
- 1722–1731 Richard Daniel (afterwards Dean of Down, 1731)
- 1731–1736 John Brandreth (afterwards Dean of Emly, 1736)
- 1736–1753 James Auchmuty
- 1753–1764 Anthony Cope
- 1764–1768 Benjamin Barrington
- 1768–1796 Hugh Hamilton (afterwards Bishop of Clonfert and Kilmacduagh, 1796)
- 1796–1830 Rt Hon James Hewitt
- 1830–1841 James Edward Jackson
- 1841–1851 Edward Gustavus Hudson
- 1851–1874 Brabazon William Disney
- 1875–1886 William Reeves (afterwards Bishop of Down, Connor and Dromore, 1886)
- 1886–1896 George Alexander Chadwick (afterwards Bishop of Derry and Raphoe, 1896)
- 1896 Augustine FitzGerald
- 1900 Robert James Shaw-Hamilton
- 1908 Francis George Le Poer McClintock
- 1924 Robert Smyly Greer Hamilton
- 1928–1938 Ford Tichborne (afterwards Bishop of Ossory, Ferns and Leighlin, 1938)
- 1938 Thomas James McEndoo
- 1955 Henry West Rennison
- 1965 Henry Alexander Lillie
- 1979 John Robert Megaw Crooks
- 1989 Herbert Cassidy
- 2006–2011 Patrick William Rooke (afterwards Bishop of Tuam, Killala and Achonry, 2011)
- 2011–2020 Gregory John Orchard Dunstan
- 2020–present Shane Forster
