= Edward Hinton (priest) =

Anglican priest

Edward Hinton was an Anglican priest in Ireland during the second half of the 17th century.

He was born in County Kilkenny and educated at Merton College, Oxford. He was Archdeacon of Cashel from 1693 until his death in 1703.
