= James Frey (priest) =

Swiss dean in Ireland

John James Frey (6 June 1606 – 28 August 1636) was a Swiss dean in Ireland.

== Life ==
He was born Johann Jacob Frey in Basel on 6 June 1606 as the son of a notable Basel family. He studied at the University of Basel, where he graduated MA in 1625. He then went to study in Geneva, Lyon and Oxford. From January 1629, he was tutor to Richard Boyle, 1st Earl of Burlington, the oldest son of Richard Boyle, 1st Earl of Cork, possibly recommended by Sir Henry Wotton. Frey was incorporated MA of Oxford as a member of Christ Church on 4 July 1629, and ordained as Anglican Deacon at Westminster in May 1630. He was in Basel as pastor at St. Margrethen for a few months and briefly matriculated for theology in Leyden. In 1632–1633, Frey toured France with young Richard Boyle, then stayed in London and Lismore, doing research for Archbishop James Ussher. This scholarly work included organizing a copy of the single MS of Scipio Lentulus' History of the Waldensian People.

In the summer of 1635, after Dungarvan's marriage, Frey returned to Switzerland, bringing back a library of about 130 English volumes which are held at the University of Basel. They include sermons and theology, but also poetry, plays, Walter Raleigh's History of the world, and a Second Folio of Shakespeare's works. The books formed one of the foundations for the Frey-Grynaeum library in Basel, a building and collection established by the theology professor Johann Ludwig Frey, a great-grandson (1682–1759). About 30 volumes carry Frey's signature and some notes. These volumes include a Bible in Hebrew and Greek but also some quite surprising items for a Protestant minister: Francis Bacon's Advancement of Learning, Marcus Aurelius' Meditations in a critical English edition, the early Latin epigrams of the Anglo-Catholic poet Richard Crashaw, John Selden's Marmora Arundelliana and Plato's Menexenos with several pages of notes.

Frey had returned to Basel to take up a position as Professor of Greek at the University of Basel, where he was much respected but felt "bound to Basel against my will". He was longing to return to Britain but turned down a pressing offer to tutor the young semi-orphaned sons of George Villiers, 1st Duke of Buckingham. Instead, he agreed to become dean of Armagh in Ireland. on 15 November 1635, planning to move to Ireland in the spring of 1637. On 28 August 1636, the day that the Basel authorities decided to grant him leave to take up his post in Ireland, Frey died of a "fever", just 30 years old.

Frey was intensely mourned by Swiss and English friends as a brilliantly gifted and lovable man. In 1653, James Ussher fondly remembered the intellectual exchanges he enjoyed when "our Frey" was among the living ("commercium literarum, dum Freius noster in vivis versaretur"). Frey's correspondence (University Library of Basel and Chatsworth House) shows that his linguistic skills included - beyond the usual theologian's tools of Latin, Greek, Hebrew, Syriac and possibly Arabic – fluent and idiomatic French, Italian and English. Ordained at age 23, he must have spoken English well enough to preach even then, and he corresponded in English with scholars such as Ussher and John Gregory (who usually carried on international exchanges in Latin) as well as with aristocratic lords and ladies such as Frances Clifford and her daughter Elizabeth Boyle.
