= Ed Hinton (sportswriter) =

American journalist (1948–2025)

Edward Talmage Hinton
- Born: July 21, 1948; Laurel, Mississippi, U.S.
- Died: February 6, 2025 (aged 76); Birmingham, Alabama, U.S.
- Occupation: Motorsports columnist
- Years active: 1970–2014

Edward Talmage Hinton (July 21, 1948 – February 6, 2025) was an American motorsports columnist for ESPN.com.

== Life and career ==
Hinton was born in Laurel, Mississippi. He attended the University of Mississippi and later the University of Southern Mississippi, where he was a member of Sigma Alpha Epsilon, graduating in 1970. He began working for the Orlando Sentinel covering the NASCAR racing circuit. Hinton moved to Atlanta and married his wife, Snow, in 1983. In the late 1980s, Hinton joined the new sports daily newspaper, The National, which folded after only a few years. In 1988, he and his wife had their only child, Tyler.

In 1993 Hinton joined Dallas Cowboys football coach Jimmy Johnson and wrote Turning the Thing Around. Hinton was then hired as a senior writer for Sports Illustrated.

In May 1999, Hinton was involved in a controversy at Sports Illustrated with the Indy Racing League. Three spectators were fatally injured after a tire went into the grandstands during a race at Lowe's Motor Speedway in North Carolina. The IRL deemed Hinton's and SI's coverage of the accident insensitive and inappropriate, and revoked Hinton's credentials for the 1999 Indianapolis 500. In response, the Chicago Tribune and The Detroit News announced they were boycotting the race. A few days later, Hinton's credentials were restored, and he reportedly attended.

In 1999, Hinton and his family moved to North Carolina, and in 2000, Hinton returned to the Sentinel and the Chicago Tribune newspaper chain.

On January 2, 2008, Hinton left the Sentinel and Chicago Tribune newspaper chain. On July 3, 2008, ESPN announced that it had hired Hinton as a senior writer for its digital platforms. Hinton announced his retirement on December 31, 2014.

Hinton died in Birmingham, Alabama, on February 6, 2025, at the age of 76.

== Death of Dale Earnhardt ==
On February 18, 2001, NASCAR driver and long-time friend of Hinton, Dale Earnhardt, was killed on the final turn of the Daytona 500. Hinton and the Sentinel suspected that, like Kenny Irwin and Adam Petty, Earnhardt's cause of death had been basilar skull fracture (Hinton had recently published a three-part series on the subject of NASCAR safety) and claimed that under Florida law, the state was legally required to turn over Earnhardt's autopsy photographs. Teresa Earnhardt and others claimed the newspaper could not have access to the photographs, leading to a First Amendment legal battle which was finally concluded by an official NASCAR report on Earnhardt's death.
