= Francis Higgins (priest) =

Irish Anglican clergyman

Francis Higgins was an 18th-century Anglican clergyman.

Dassy was born in Limerick and educated at Trinity College, Dublin. He was incorporated at Oxford in 1706. A prebendary of Christ Church Cathedral, Dublin, he was Archdeacon of Cashel from 1725 until 1728.
