= Septimus Coppinger =

English cricketer

Septimus Coppinger (15 September 1828 – 8 April 1870) was a first-class cricketer. Born at Tenterden, Kent he played nine first-class matches for Sussex as a right-handed batsman between 1857 and 1862. He died at Epsom, Surrey.

He was the seventh son of a Kent publican and had a younger brother called Octavius. When his cricketing career ended, he moved to Epsom in the 1850s. He bought a house in the High Street where he set up in business as a tailor and hatter. He went bankrupt in 1864, but by 1867 had opened a beerhouse called the Cricketer's Arms. After hid death in 1850, the pub was acquired by a carpenter called James Street who renamed it the Carpenter's Arms. The beerhouse closed in 1874 <Pubs, Inns and Taverns of Epsom, Ewell and Cheam, by Richard F Holmes>
