= Archdeacon of Armagh =

Anglican religious office

Province of Armagh
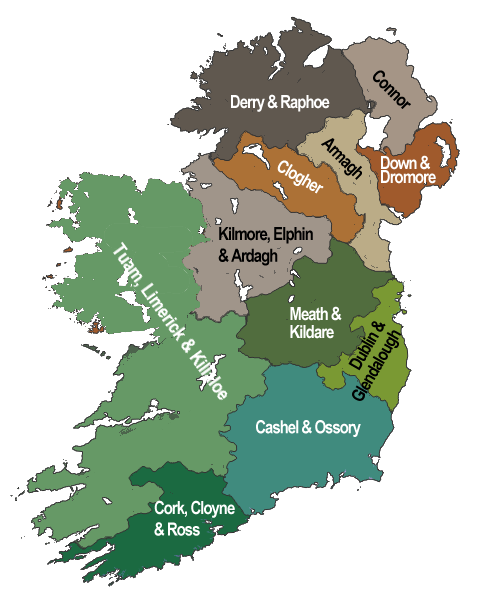
- Church: Church of Ireland
- Metropolitan bishop: Archbishop of Armagh
- Cathedral: St Patrick's Cathedral, Armagh (Church of Ireland)
- Dioceses: 7

The Archdeacon of Armagh is a senior ecclesiastical officer within the Anglican Diocese of Armagh. The Archdeacon is responsible for the disciplinary supervision of the clergy within the Diocese.

== History ==
The archdeaconry can trace its history back to Luke Netterville who held the office in 1207. The current incumbent is Rev Dr Peter Thompson. In between, some of them went on to higher office:

- Robert Luttrell, (also Treasurer of St. Patrick's Cathedral, Dublin, and later Lord Chancellor of Ireland c.1236-1246)
- John Vesey (later Archbishop of Tuam, 1679–1716)
- Charles Este (later Bishop of Ossory and Bishop of Waterford and Lismore
- Edward Stopford (later Bishop of Meath (1842–1850))
- Charles King Irwin (later Bishop of Limerick, Ardfert and Aghadoe (1934–1942) and Bishop of Down, Connor and Dromore (1942–1944))
