= Shandon =

Shandon may refer to:

== People ==
- Shandon Anderson, American basketball player
- Shandon Baptiste, Grenadian footballer
- Shandon Hopeau, American soccer player
- Shandon Sahm, American drummer

== Places ==
Australia

- Shandon, Rockhampton, a heritage house in Queensland

Republic of Ireland

- Shandon, Dublin
- Shandon, Cork
  - Shandon Castle, Cork
  - Shandon Street

United Kingdom

- Shandon, Argyll and Bute, Scotland
  - Shandon Castle, Argyll and Bute, Scotland
  - Shandon railway station, Scotland
- Shandon, Edinburgh, Scotland

United States

- Shandon, California
  - Shandon Joint Unified School District
- Shandon, Ohio

== See also ==
- Shandon Rovers GAA
- Shandong
