= Shandon Street =

Retail zone of Cork City, Ireland

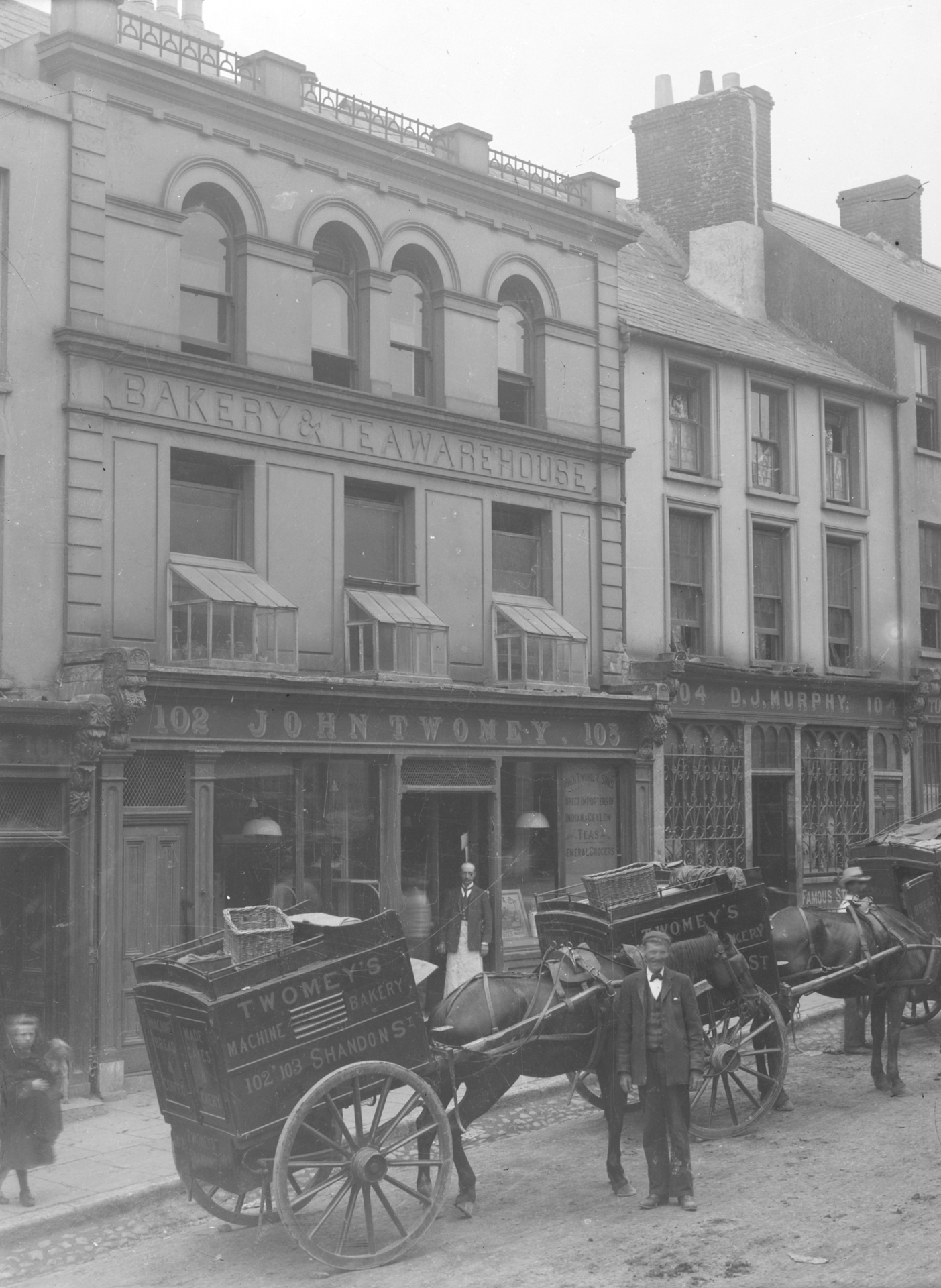
- Shandon Street circa 1910

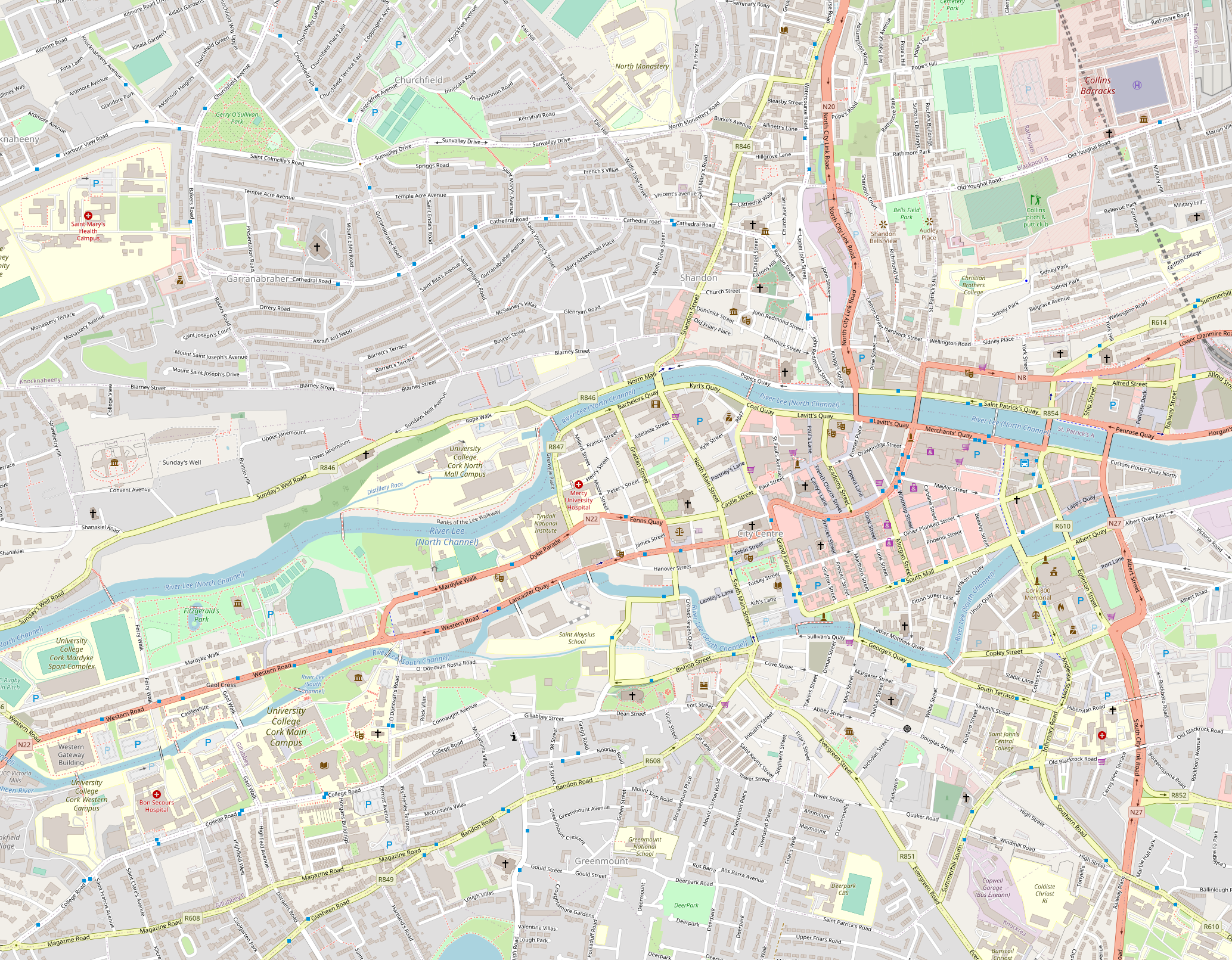
- Location within Cork Central
- Native name: Sráid an tSeandúin (Irish)
- Namesake: Shandon (Irish sean dún, "old hillfort")
- Length: 400 m (1,300 ft)
- Location: Shandon Cork, Ireland
- Postal code: T23
- Coordinates: 51.9032°N 8.4781°W
- north end: Gerald Griffin Street, Cathedral Road, Cathedral Street
- Major junctions: Blarney Street, Dominick Street
- south end: North Gate Bridge (by North Main Street), Farren's Quay, North Mall

Shandon Street (Irish: Sráid an tSeandúin), formerly known as Mallow Lane, is a street in the Shandon area of Cork City, Ireland and is a retail area on the North-Side of Cork city.

== Etymology ==
The name Shandon stems from the Irish Sean Dún, meaning "Old Fort". It is believed that this refers to the ringfort of the MacCarthaigh family, who occupied the area around 1000 A.D.

== History ==
=== Initial development ===
The area was originally developed by the Normans, as a route to the north gate of the city, and rose in prominence due to its proximity to Shandon Castle, the administrative centre of the province of Munster. The area was heavily damaged during the 1690 Siege of Cork, but subsequent rebuilding saw the erection of the landmark St. Anne's Church. The North Cathedral was also erected at the top of Shandon Street in 1624. The present day structure, however, is the fifth church to occupy the site; churches have been rebuilt there numerous times, most recently following an 1820 fire. Commercial activity at this time included a regular cattle market, where large numbers of animals were exported to the West Indies, Eastern U.S., Britain, and Canada.

In response to a 1582 famine and outbreak of plague, Stephen Skiddy, a Master Vintner, willed funds to build a number of almshouses in the city. One such almshouse, built in the 18th century and referred to as Skiddy's Almshouse, is still standing adjacent to Shandon Street.

=== Growth ===
The 18th century saw the development of the Butter Market in response to the penal laws, which indirectly encouraged commercial ventures among wealthy Catholic families. This led to the foundation of the Committee of Butter Merchants, who, in 1770, instated the inspection of butter exports. The increasing butter trade resulted in Shandon Street becoming an important international trading centre, and a focal point within the city. There was a notable diversity in standards of living in the area, with wealthy retailers living directly on the street, and many tenement halls on the numerous adjoining streets.

=== Later developments ===
The closure of the Butter Market in 1924 due to competition from continental Europe led to a period of decline in the area. Modern attempts at reversing the decline include the 2004 Shandon Area Renewal Scheme, which saw some redevelopment of Shandon Street. This €15m scheme included the renewal of paving and the replacement of derelict buildings with infill housing.
