= John Benson (architect) =

Irish architect (1812 – 1874)

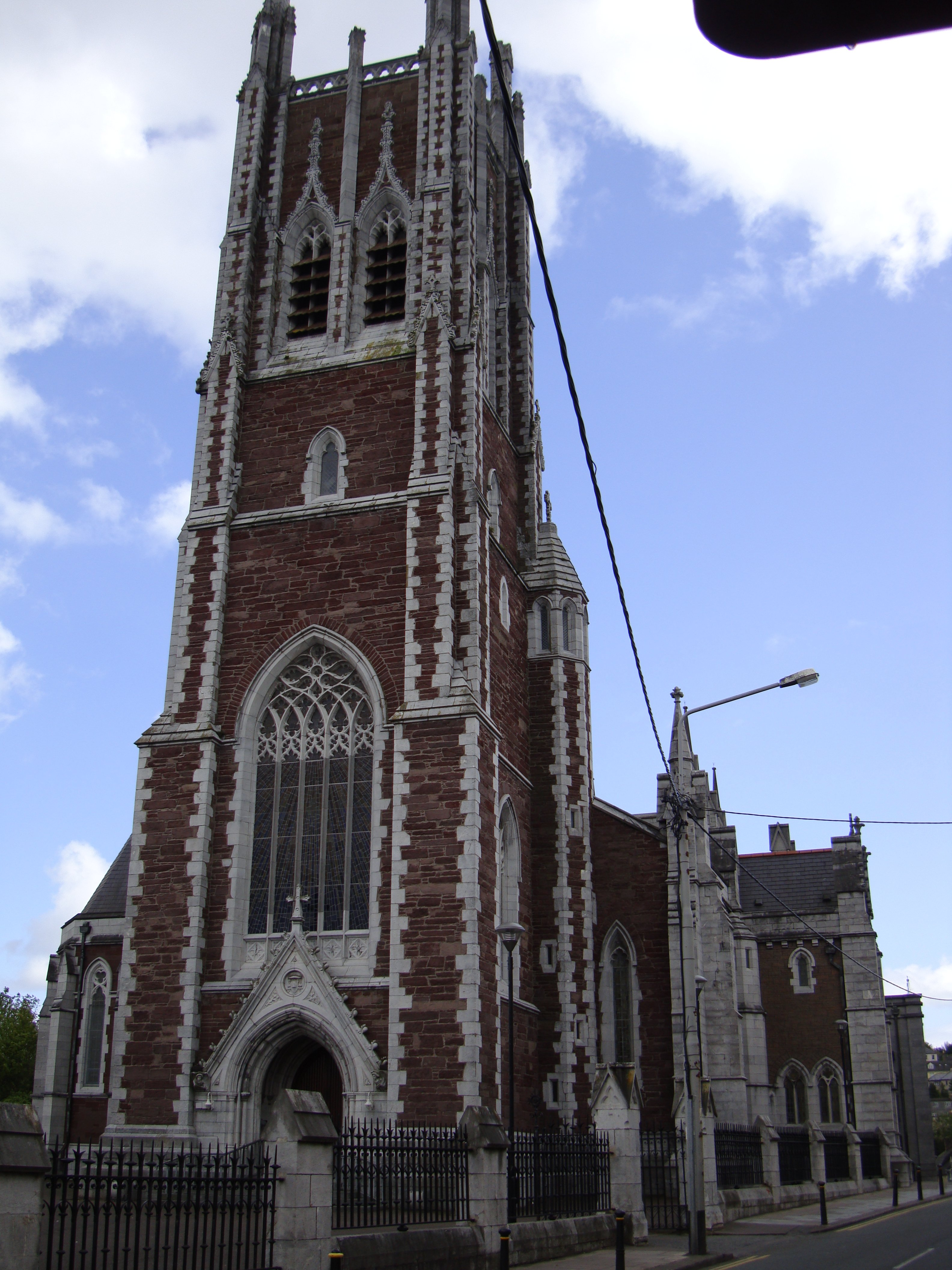
- Cathedral of St. Mary and St. Anne, Cork
- Born: 1812; Collooney, County Sligo, Ireland
- Died: 17 October 1874 (aged 61–62); Brompton, London, England
- Education: Royal Dublin Society School of Architectural Drawing
- Occupation: Architect
- Spouse: Mary Clementine Pyne (m. 1849)
- Projects: Restoration of Markree Castle in Collooney
- Design: Main pavilion for the Great Industrial Exhibition in Dublin, 1853

Sir John Benson ICE (1812 – 17 October 1874) was an Irish architect, born in Collooney, County Sligo. Although most of his work was in Cork, he was knighted for his design for the Dublin Great Industrial Exhibition.

== Life ==
John Benson was born in Collooney, County Sligo, in 1812. At the age of twenty-one he was sent by Edward Joshua Cooper of Markree Castle, to 'a technical school in Dublin', presumably the Royal Dublin Society's School of Architectural Drawing. Early work included the restoration of Markree Castle in Collooney.

Benson passed his surveyor's examination in 1846 and worked as county surveyor for Cork and was involved in the relief work during the famine of 1847. In 1848 he was appointed as consulting engineer to the Cork Harbour Board and improved the navigation of the river. He was architect for the 1852 Irish Industrial Exhibition and won the competition to design the Exhibition Building for the Great Industrial Exhibition (1853) in Dublin. He was knighted for his work at the 1853 exhibition.

Benson was a member of the Institution of Civil Engineers. He was engineer and architect for the Cork and Macroom Direct Railway and the Rathkeale & Newcastle Railway. He also supervised the refurbishment of the Theatre Royal, Cork in the 1860s.

== Architectural works ==
- The Firkin Crane building was designed by Sir John Benson and opened in 1855. The building is a unique rotunda, which formed part of Cork's original Butter Exchange, and currently houses the Butter Museum.
- The Atheneum (Cork Opera House (1855) used as a template the design for the exhibition buildings at the Irish Industrial Exhibition.
- Berwick Fountain, Cork (1860)
- St. Patrick's Bridge, Cork (1861)
- The Western Tower over the main door of the North Chapel in Cork was designed by Benson.
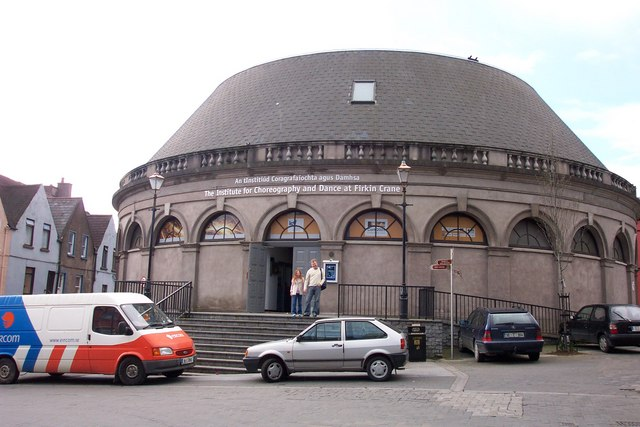
Firkin Crane, Cork

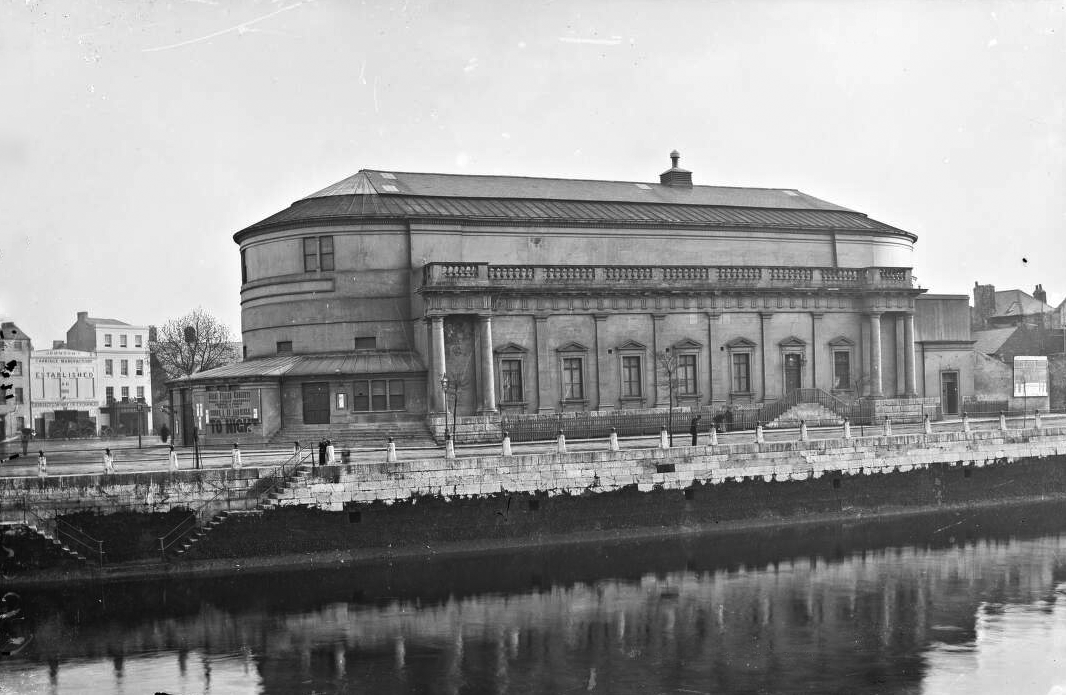
Cork Opera House, opened 1855

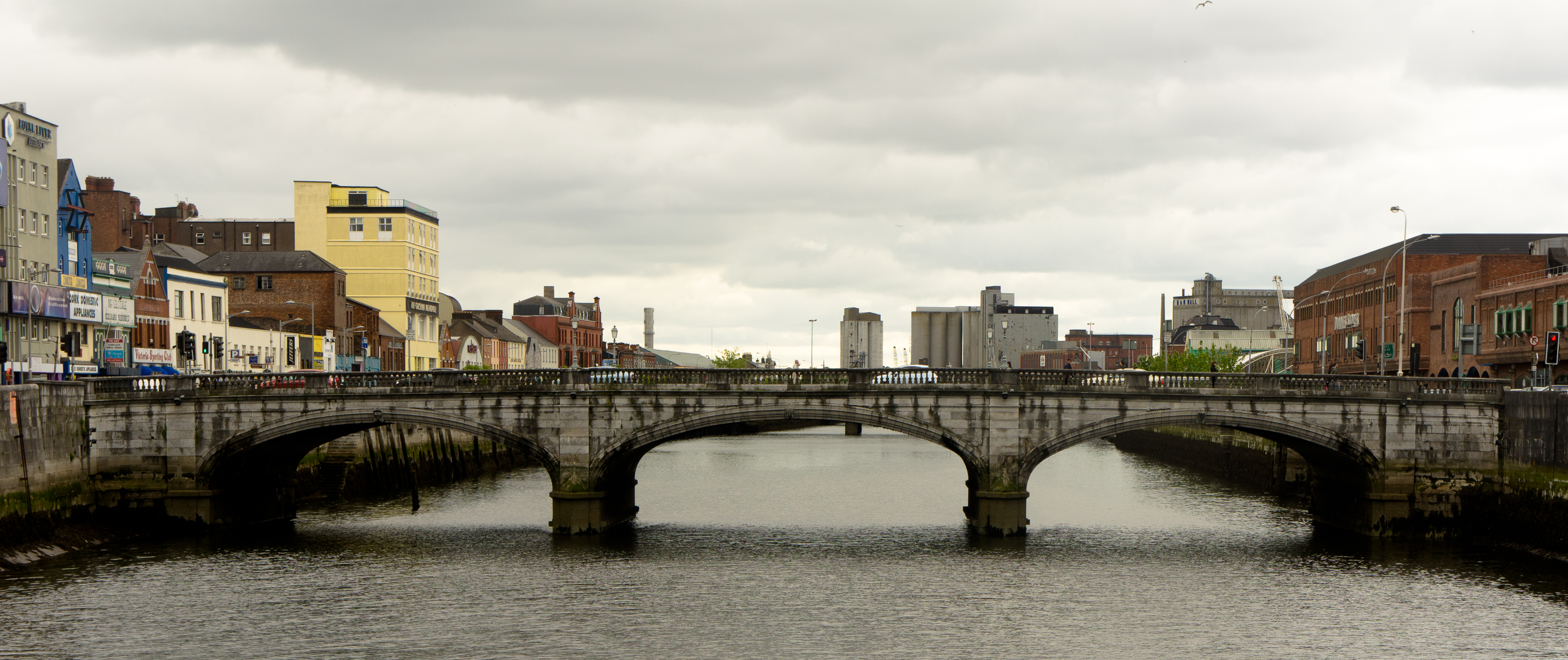
St Patrick's Bridge, Cork
