= Cork Opera House =

Venue in Cork, Ireland

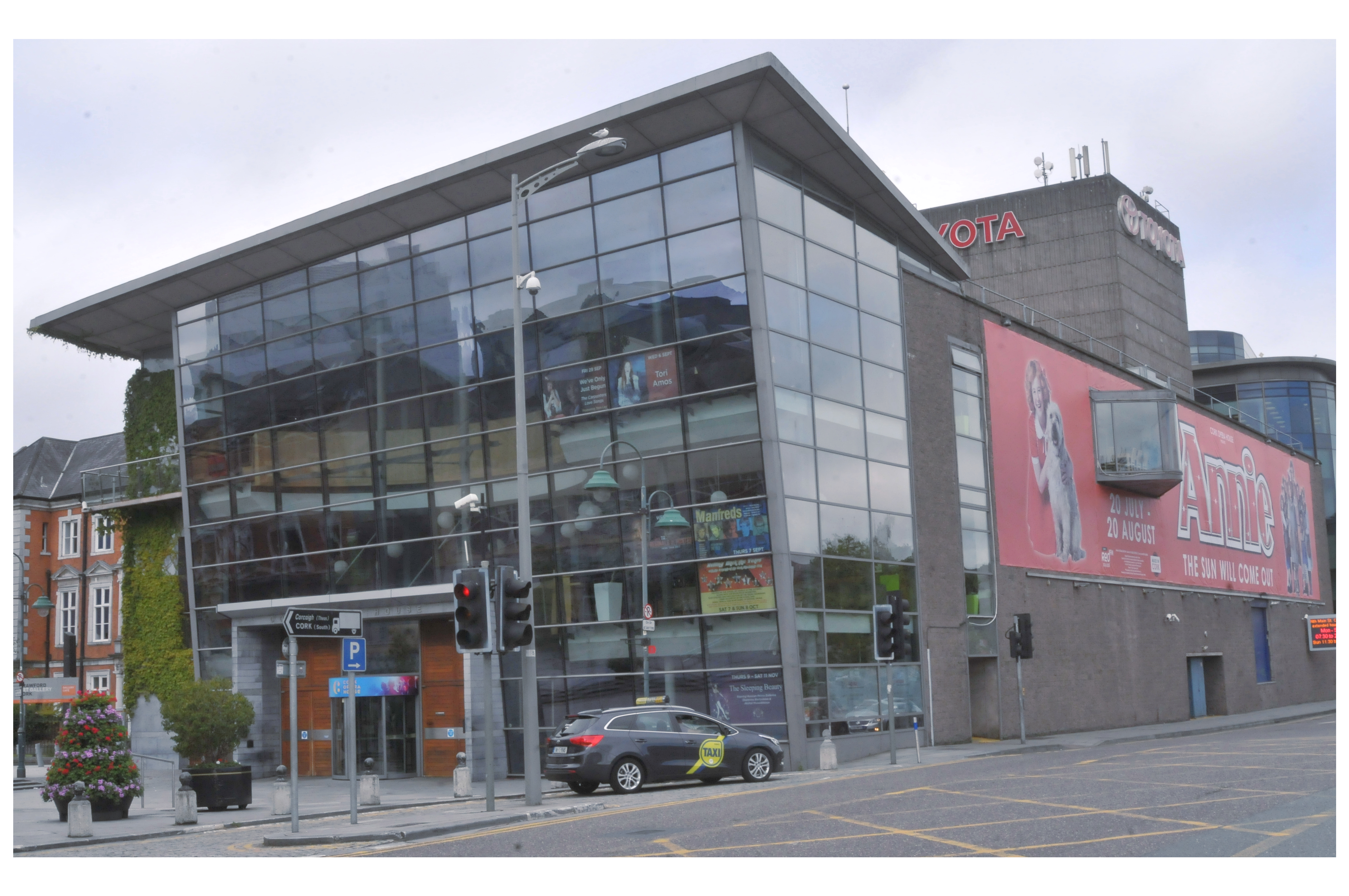
- Cork Opera House in 2017
- Interactive map of Cork Opera House
- Former names: Athenaeum (1855–1875); The Munster Hall (1875–1877)
- Address: Emmett Place; Cork; Ireland
- Coordinates: 51.9003°N 8.4726°W
- Capacity: ~1,000 (main auditorium)
- Current use: Theatre, music, film and comedy venue

Construction
- Opened: 1855
- Rebuilt: 1965
- Years active: 1855–1955, 1965–present
- Architects: Scott Tallon Walker (1963 Building); Murray Ó Laoire Architects (2000 Facade)

Website
- Official website

Cork Opera House is a theatre and opera house in Cork in Ireland. The first venue opened in 1855 on Emmet Place (then known as Nelson's Place) to the rear of the Crawford Art Gallery. This original building was destroyed by fire in 1955, and a replacement opened in 1965. With a number of additions in the early 21st century, the 1000-seat venue hosted over 100 theatre, music, opera, and comedy events in 2015.

== History ==
=== Original building (1855–1955) ===
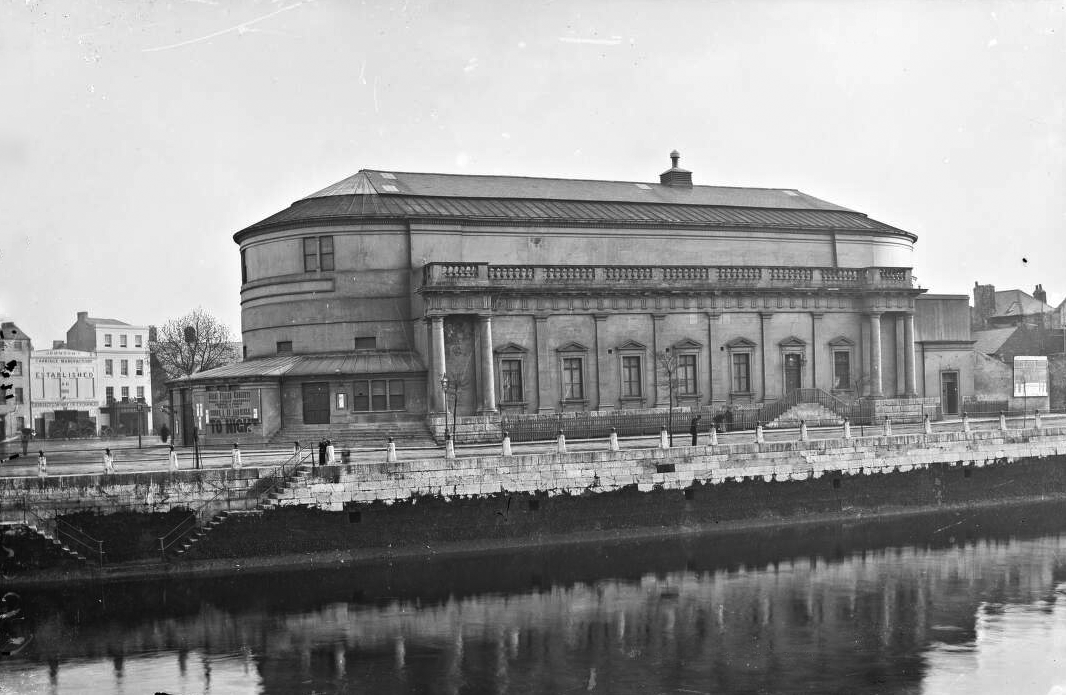
Cork Opera House as pictured in the late 19th century

Cork's opera house was originally built in the 1850s to designs by architect John Benson. Intended for the "promotion of science, literature and the fine arts, and the diffusion of architectural knowledge", the building was based on a template that the architect had used for the exhibition buildings at the Irish Industrial Exhibition.

Opened in 1855, this building was originally called "The Athenaeum", and was renamed "The Munster Hall" in 1875. It was renamed as the "Opera House", after extensive reconstruction, in 1877.

The opera house was renovated to plans by Arthur Hill in 1908. While this building survived the Burning of Cork by British forces in 1920, it burned down several decades later in its centenary year of 1955. The fire started on the evening of 12 December 1955, caused by an electrical fault and fueled by wooden materials.

=== Redevelopment (1963–present) ===
The site remained undeveloped for several years, until the remains of the old building were bulldozed in early 1963 and development on a new theatre commenced. The newly constructed Opera House opened on the same site in 1965.

This 1960s building was designed by Scott Tallon Walker, and was officially opened by then President of Ireland, Éamon de Valera, in October 1965.

In 2000, large-scale renovation works were completed on both the facade of the building and the surrounding Emmett Place. Subsequent works include the development of a new café, updated acoustics and seating.

== Operation ==
The Opera House has always hosted performances other than opera, with theatre, music, drama, dance, comedy and other performance types making-up the venue's repertoire.

In 2015, the Opera House hosted 276 performances of 108 events in the main 1000-seat auditorium. The Half Moon Theatre, a smaller 100-seat venue which lies to the rear of the Opera House, hosted 77 performances of 29 events in the same period.
