= Firkin Crane =

Irish dance company

- Firkin Crane Centre
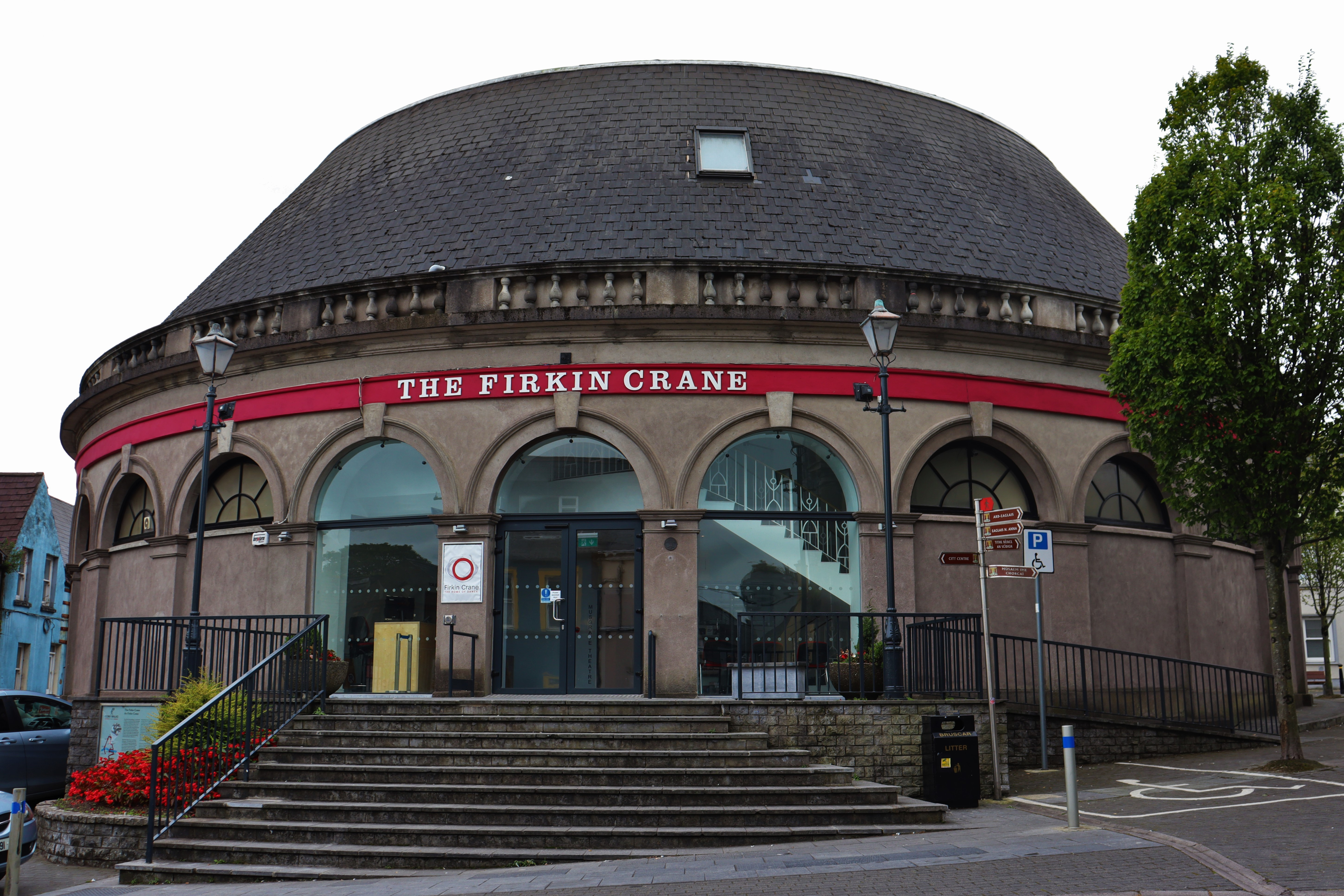
- The Firkin Crane Centre in Shandon, Cork City.

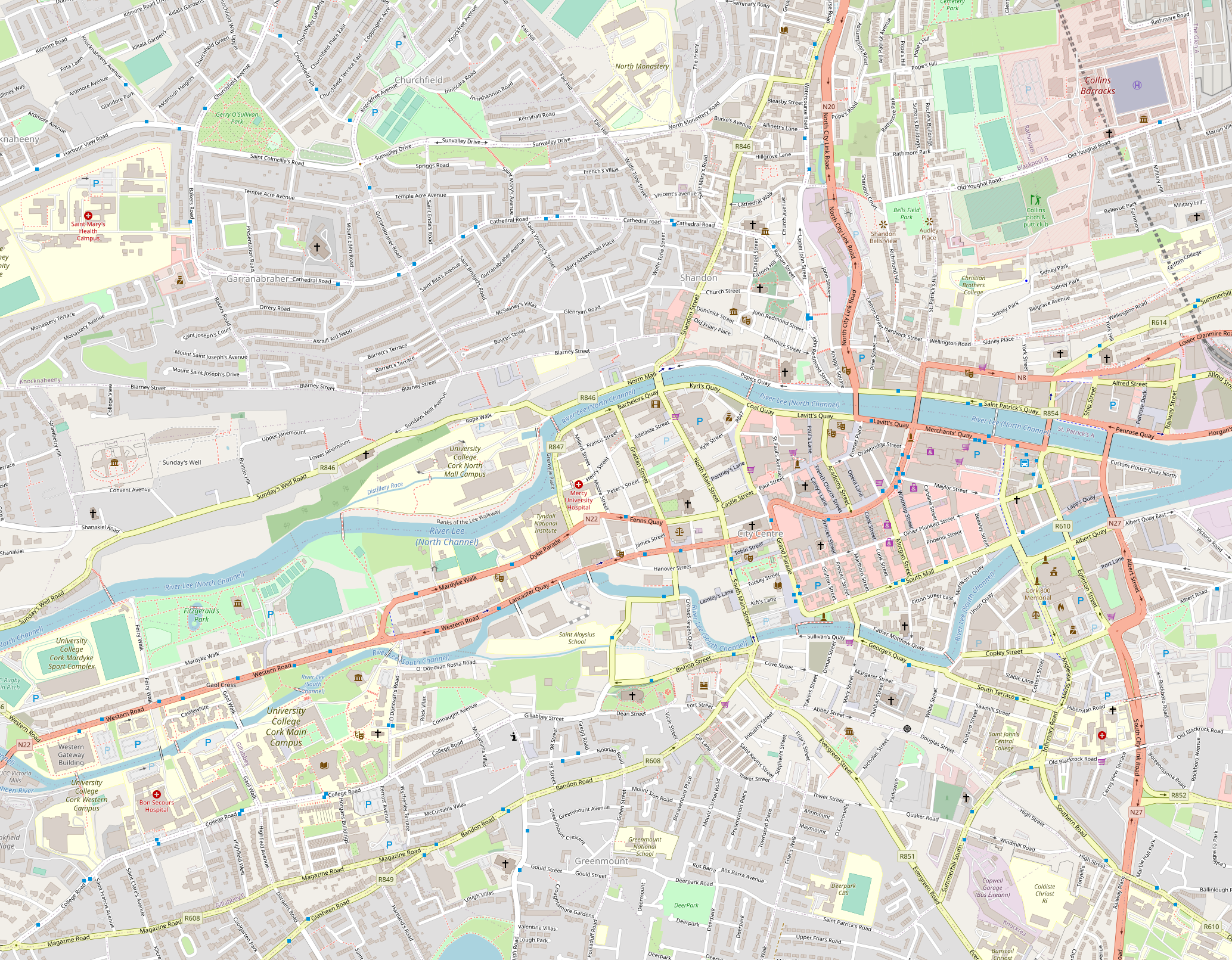
- Location within Cork Central
- Address: John Redmond St. Cork; Ireland
- Coordinates: 51°54′09″N 8°28′35″W
- Elevation: 23 m (75 ft)
- Capacity: 238 (Smurfit Theatre)

Construction
- Built: 1855
- Rebuilt: 1992
- Architect: John Benson

Website
- www.firkincrane.ie

The Firkin Crane is a non-profit arts organisation based in the protected building of the same name in the Shandon area of Cork City in Ireland. It is a theatre and dance centre and is a permanent base for Cork City Ballet and Crux Dance Theatre.

== History ==
=== Building ===
The Firkin Crane building is located near the Church of St Anne, Shandon close to the Cork Butter Museum and the site of the original Cork City Butter Exchange. The building was opened in August 1855, designed to a rotunda plan by Sir John Benson for the Butter Exchange. The building's name derives from the "Firkin" unit (9 gallons or 80Ibs of butter) and the "Crane" weighing scale. Where the building currently stands is reputed to have been a possible site for a fort belonging to the MacCarthy Clan. The Shandon Butter Factory was housed within the Firkin Crane and the firkins were weighed up there. A margarine factory (James Daly & Sons) replaced the market in 1924. This closed in 1976.

=== Dance company ===
Joan Denise Moriarty created an Arts Council approved space in the building until a fire destroyed it on 6 July 1980. According to the Cork Examiner, Moriarty was just about to embark on an IR£400,000 campaign to renovate it. Three units from Cork Fire Brigade fought the fire. Within minutes of the fire breaking out, the structure was an inferno, with most of the building being constructed of wood which had been covered in a thick coating of grease over the years. In response to the fire, Tom Donnelly, general manager of the Irish Ballet Company, said they were determined with their plans to establish there. Gardaí did not rule out the possibility that the fire may have been maliciously started.

The building was rebuilt using funds from the European Economic Community Architectural Award for Ireland. On 26 April 1992, the building was re-opened by then Taoiseach Albert Reynolds. It became known as the Firkin Crane Centre. By 2000, the Firkin Crane Dance Development Agency was in operation.

According to The Encyclopedia of Ireland, by Oxford University Press, it was Ireland's only dedicated dance venue in 2000.

=== Performances ===
It held the William Thompson Weekend School in 2003. Ireland's first dance house, The Institute for Choreography and Dance, was based in the building, and became a founding member of the European Dancehouse Network in 2004. It continued as a centre dedicated to choreographic research until 2006.

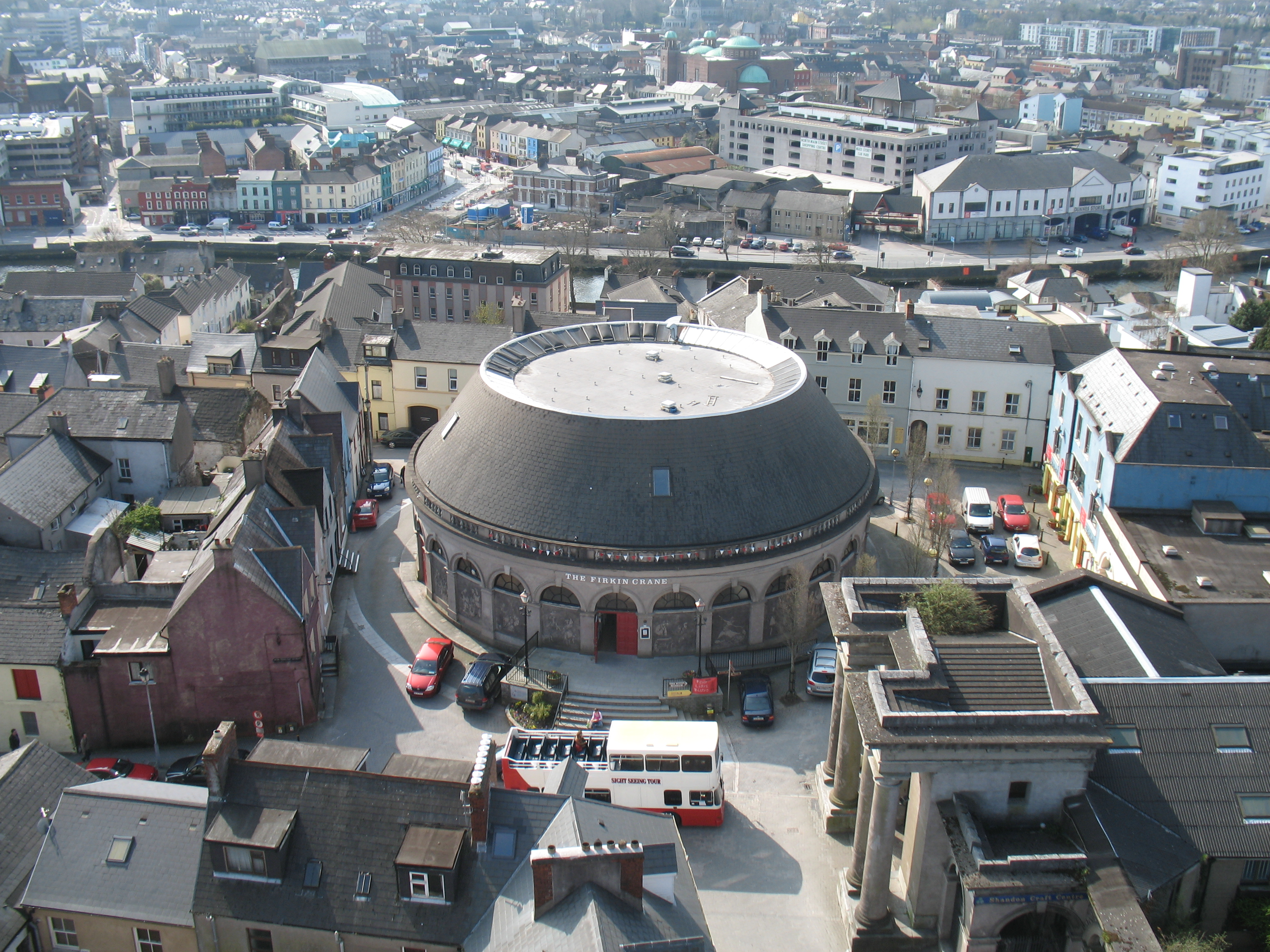
View from St. Anne's Church over the Firkin Crane and Cork City.

Dance performances were held in the Firkin Crane in 2015 as part of Cork Culture Night. In 2018, a documentary on the history of the Ford Factory in Cork was held in the building. It also hosted a play called Cosy, featuring an all-female cast as part of the Cork Midsummer Festival.

As of 2020, it hosted bursary awards. That year, 16 year old James Berkery, a ballet dancer at the Firkin Crane was nominated for a BAFTA in the UK. It was received part of a €290,000 grant to arts organisations from Cork City Council that year. CEO Paul McCarthy departed from the organisation, having held the position for 25 years.

Sinn Féin's Thomas Gould and the Green Party's Dan Boyle have served on the Firkin Crane's voluntary Board of Directors.
