= Shandon Castle, Cork =

Former castle in Cork, Ireland

Coordinates: 51.9027°N 8.4763°W

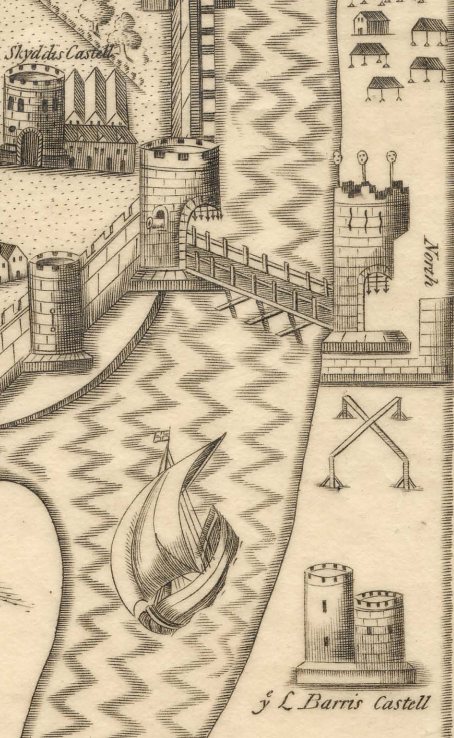
17th century map (first published 1633) showing Shandon Castle ("L[ord] Barris Castell") outside the city walls to the east of Cork's North Gate Bridge

Shandon Castle, originally known as Lord Barry's Castle, was an early medieval castle in the Shandon area of Cork city in Ireland. It was built in the late 12th century by Philip de Barry, close to an earlier ringfort. Located outside the city's gates and defensive walls, the castle was a seat of the Cambro-Norman de Barry family for several centuries.

From the late 16th century, Shandon Castle became an official residence of the President of Munster, and a "centre of English administration" in the area. In the early 17th century, during the Nine Years' War, a number of Gaelic Irish lords (and their supporters) were imprisoned there by then President George Carew. Some of those held here, including James FitzThomas FitzGerald and Florence MacCarthy Mór, were later transferred to the Tower of London. Others, like Dominic Collins who was imprisoned here after the Siege of Dunboy, were later executed.

Early 17th century maps show the castle as a "two towered structure" with a surrounding bawn wall. A late-17th century description refers to it as "a large round tower with 16 guns and a good entrenchment".

Used by the court of James II during his time in Ireland in 1688, Shandon Castle was destroyed (along with much of the city) during the Siege of Cork in 1690. Abandoned thereafter, red sandstone from the castle ruin was later used in the construction of the nearby Church of St Anne (built 1722). A monastic Dominican order occupied the castle site in the late 18th century, until it was purchased by a committee of merchants in the 19th century. A mercantile exchange building (now known as the Firkin Crane and associated with the nearby butter market) was built on the site in 1842. No standing structures of the castle remain.

== See also ==
- History of Cork
- Williamite War in Ireland
