= Frank Murphy (architect) =

Irish architect

- Born: Cork City, Ireland
- Education: University College Dublin
- Occupation: Architect
- Spouse: Mary Wood Wolfe
- Practice: Frank Murphy & Partners
- Buildings: All Saints Church, Drimoleague. Cork Distillers Bottling Plant
- Projects: Restoration of Skiddy's Almshouse, Cork City

Frank Murphy (1916–1993) was an Irish architect. Born in Cork, he was active mainly in the 1950s and 1960s, and his works include a number of modernist structures. In a 2018 editorial in the Irish Examiner, Murphy was described as "arguably Cork's most eminent and exciting modern architect", and as "Cork's unsung hero of Modernism".

== Life and career ==
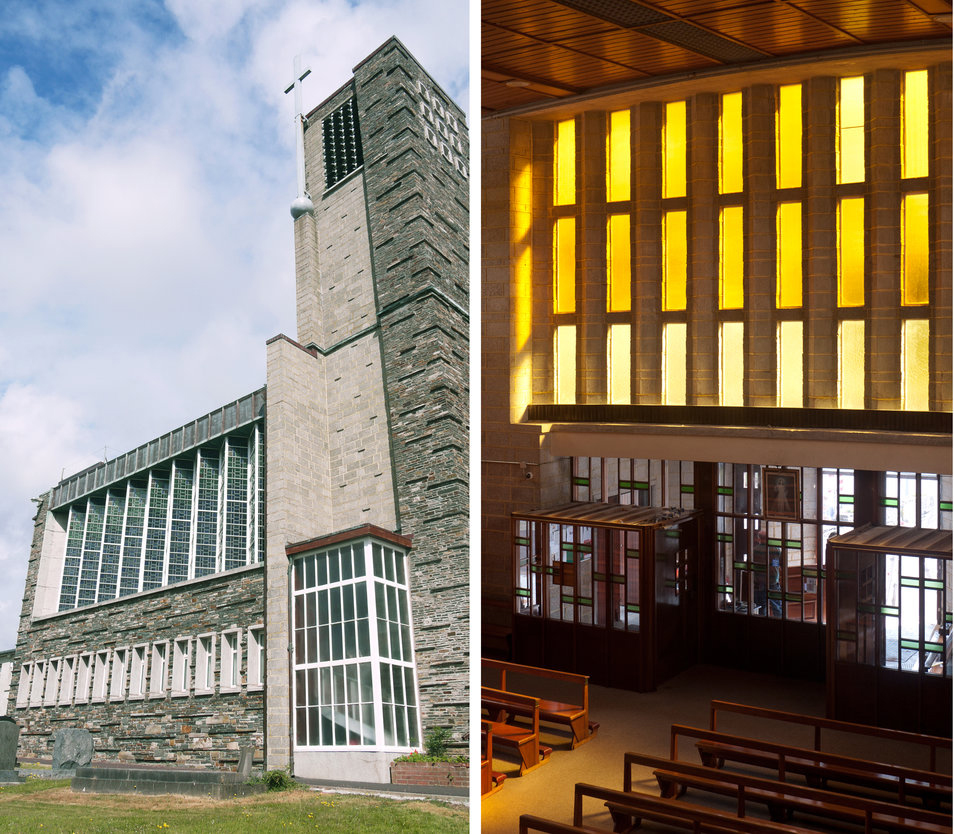
All Saints Church, Drimoleague, West Cork (1954-1956)

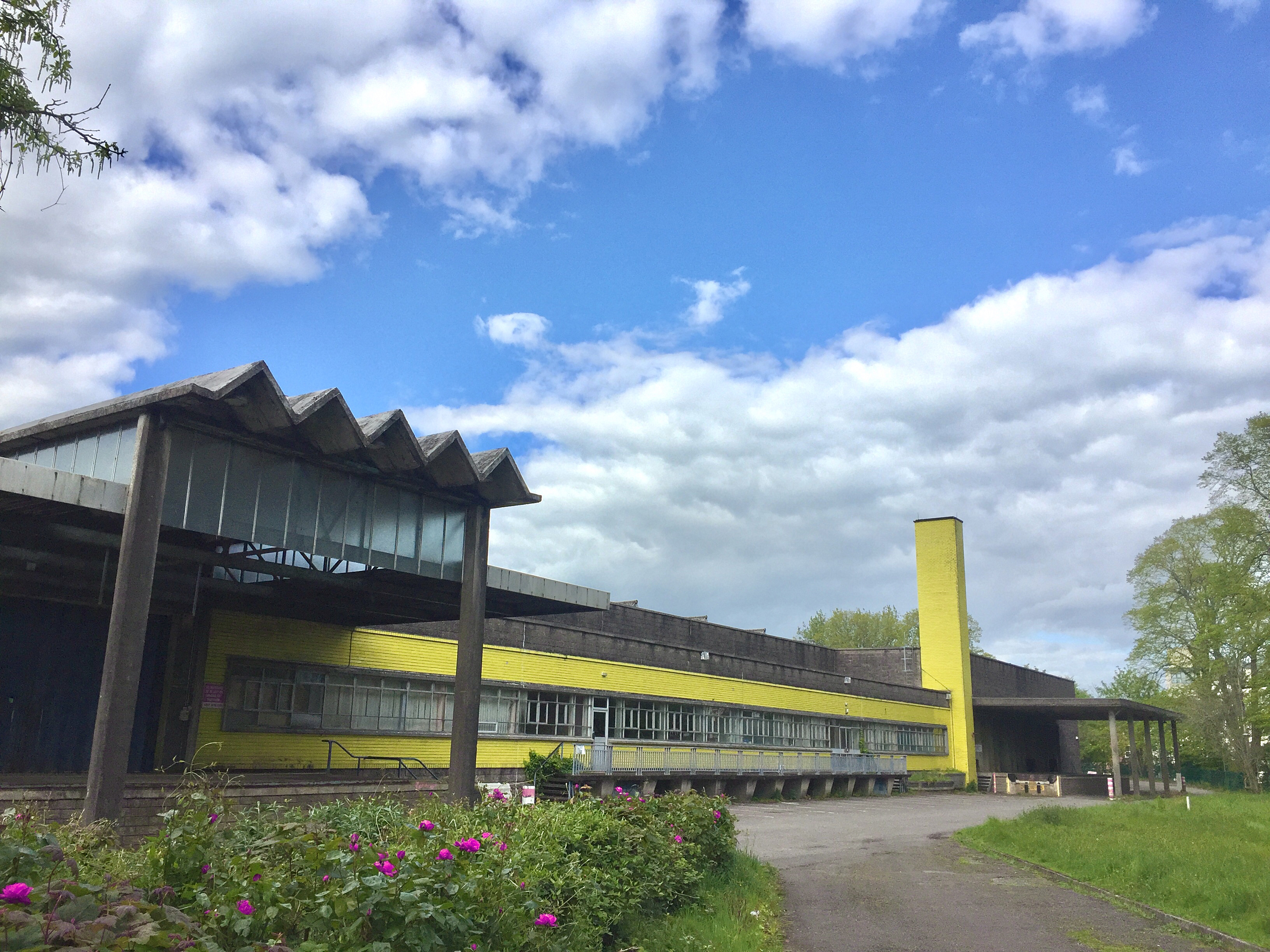
Cork Distillers Bottling plant, 1964

Murphy was born in Cork, Ireland in 1916. He graduated from University College Dublin's School of Architecture in 1939, and the following year established an architectural practice in Cork city.

Murphy was influenced by both Scandinavian and American architecture, and his work featured complex surfaces as well as curtain wall facades. While the former is particularly present in his storefront designs, the latter international style is reflected in projects such as Thompson's Bakery and the Cork Distillers Company Bottling plant. Murphy's work include churches, factories, offices, housing and shopfronts, some of which employ varied and sometimes "eccentric" material palettes.

In 1956, Murphy designed West Cork's first modernist building, All saints Church in Drimoleague, and Cork city's first purpose-built office building 'Sutton House' in 1966. In 1968, Murphy was alarmed at the destruction and demolition of Cork City's built heritage and set up the Cork Preservation Society. In 1975, during the European Architectural Heritage Year, he was awarded the European Award for Architecture, the Europa Nostra Medal, by the Royal Institute of the Architects of Ireland for his restoration of Skiddy's Almshouse.

== Works ==
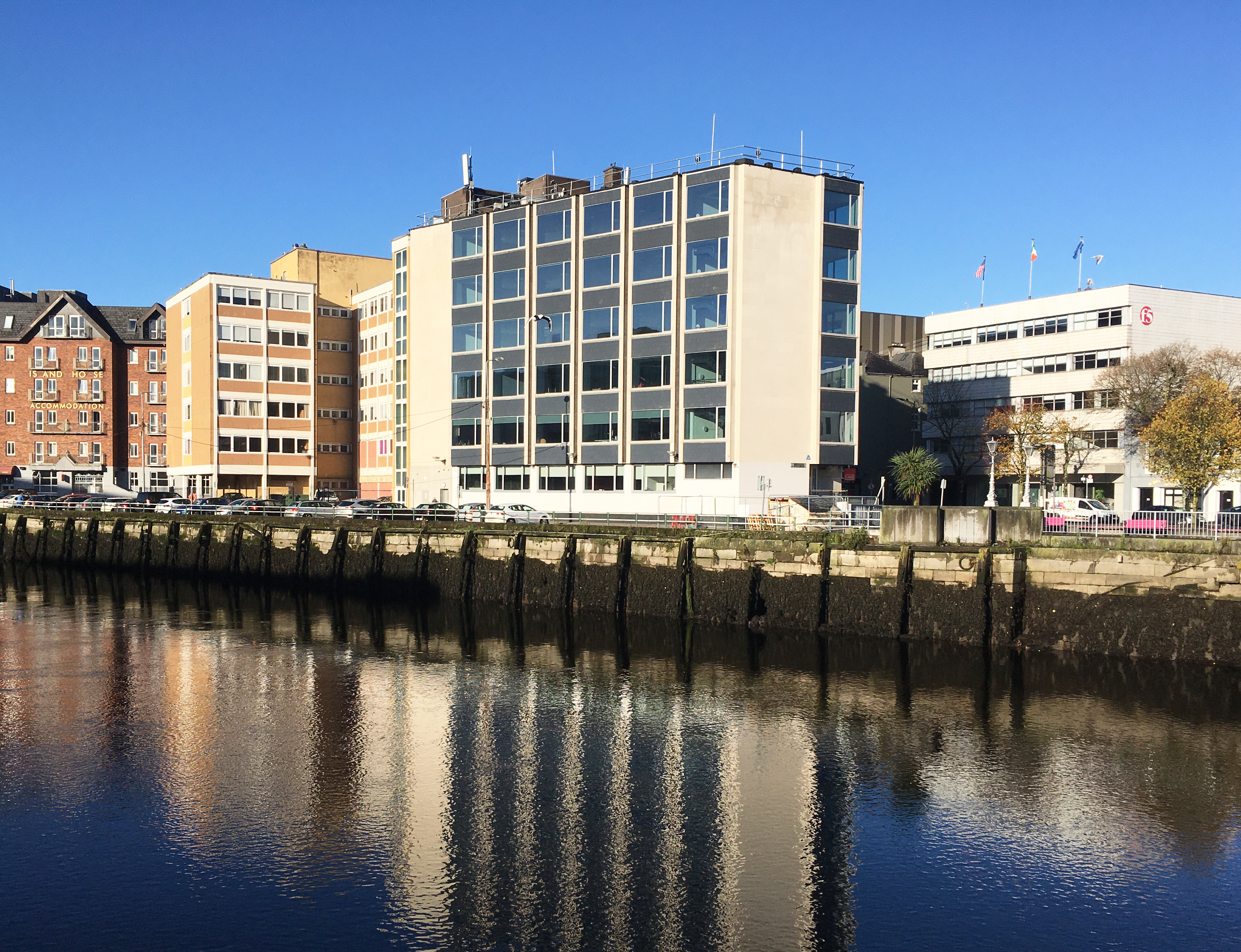
Sutton House (1965)

- Jenning's Soda Water Factory, Cork City (1949)
- Belmont Hospital, Ferrybank, Waterford (1950)
- Ballyphehane Convent, Cork City (1955)
- Drimoleague Church, West Cork (1956)
- Mayne's Pharmacy, Pembroke Street, Cork City (1960)
- Cork Distiller's Bottling Plant, Cork City (1964)
- Sutton House, Cork City (1965)
- Dale House, Leytenstone, London (1965)
- Thompson's Bakery, MacCurtain Street, Cork City (1966)
- Skiddy's Almshouse Restoration, Shandon Cork City (1975)

== Publications ==
- Cork's Modern Architect: The Work of Frank Murphy (2019) by Conor English, published by the heritage council of Ireland and Cork City Council. ISBN 978 1527241 565
