= Great Industrial Exhibition (1853) =

International exposition in Dublin

Coordinates: 53°20′25″N 6°15′07″W

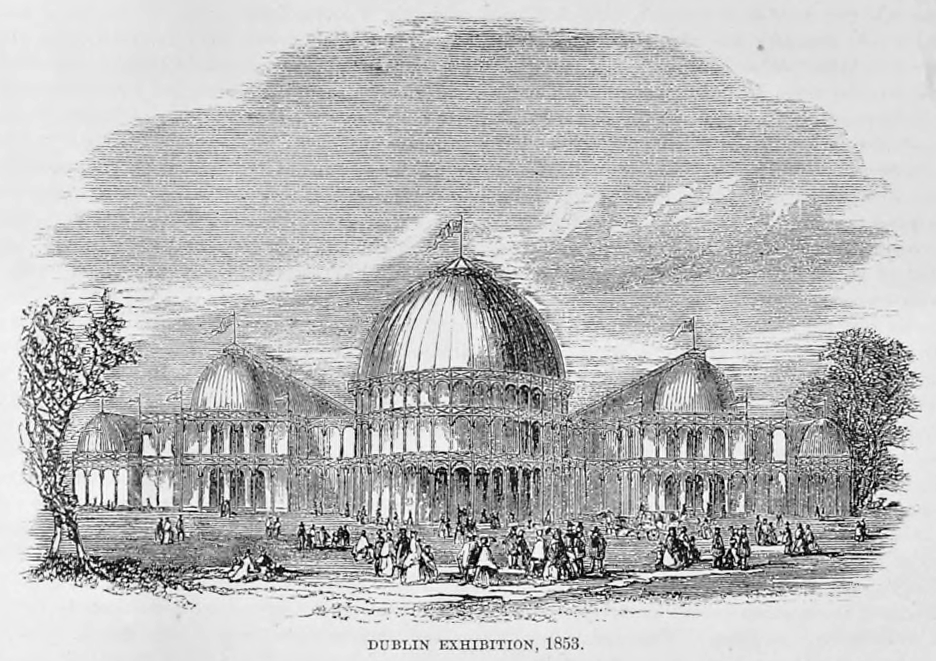
Dublin Exhibition, 1853

The Great Industrial Exhibition in 1853 was held in Dublin, Ireland. In its day, it was the largest international event to be held in Ireland. The Irish Industrial Exhibition Building, located on the grounds of Leinster House, housed the entire fair. It lasted from 12 May to 31 October, Queen Victoria accompanied by the Prince Consort and the Prince of Wales, paid an official visit on 29 August.

== Background ==
It was entirely funded by William Dargan, entrepreneur and developer of Irish railways. He had planned to donate $100,000 to the effort, but ended up giving $400,000. The intent of the exhibition was to introduce the industrial revolution to Ireland, which was behind some other European countries.

== Irish Industrial Exhibition Building ==
Visitors were struck with the quality of the building more than by any of the objects that it contained. Critics described the large exhibition building and "the rapidity with which it was erected" (a few months), and "the sufficiency of its plans, and the enormous mass of its carefully worked materials." The building is described by The Illustrated Dublin Exhibition Catalogue as:

Presenting a front to Merrion-square of 300 feet, the main or centre feature of elevation consists of a semicircular projection, which forms the Eastern termination of the Central Hall. This in a noble apartment of 425 feet in length, and 100 feet in height, covered by a semicircular roof trellis robs, in one span of 100 feet. On each side of the Centre upon trellis ribs, in one span of 100 feet. On each side of the Centre Hall, and running parallel to it for the same length, are two halls 50 feet wide, with domed roofs, similar to that which covers the main nave or hall of the building. The Height from the floor to the roof of each of these halls is 65 feet. They are approached through passages from the Centre Hall. In addition to these three halls are four compartments of 25 feet wide, running the whole length of the building; two are placed between the Centre Hall and the side halls, and two on each side of the latter; divided into sections of 25 feet square, forming convenient divisions for the purposes of classification. Over these compartments are spacious galleries, also running the length of the building, which not only afford increased space for exhibition, but form an agreeable promenade from whence the effect of the three halls may be seen to greater advantage. To the south of the Central Hall, left of the spectator, is a hall devoted to foreign contributions; adjacent to which is the Fine Arts Court, corresponding in position to the Machinery Court. The northern and southern courts have galleries running round them, from which the spectator also looks into the Central Court. The ceiling of the halls being divided into panels formed by the trellis ribs, and the other constructive parts of the building, has allowed ample opportunity for effective decoration. Light is admitted from above in one unbroken and equally distributed body. The construction of the building is strongly marked on the elevation, and forms in fact the ornamental character of the design. There are also external galleries which are attractive features. The materials of the building are iron, timber, and glass.

On 12 May 1853, when the exhibition opened, the architect (who had also been the architect for the industrial exhibition held in Cork the previous year), John Benson, was granted a knighthood. Part of the roof blew off during a storm on Christmas Eve, the year before opening.

== Exhibits ==
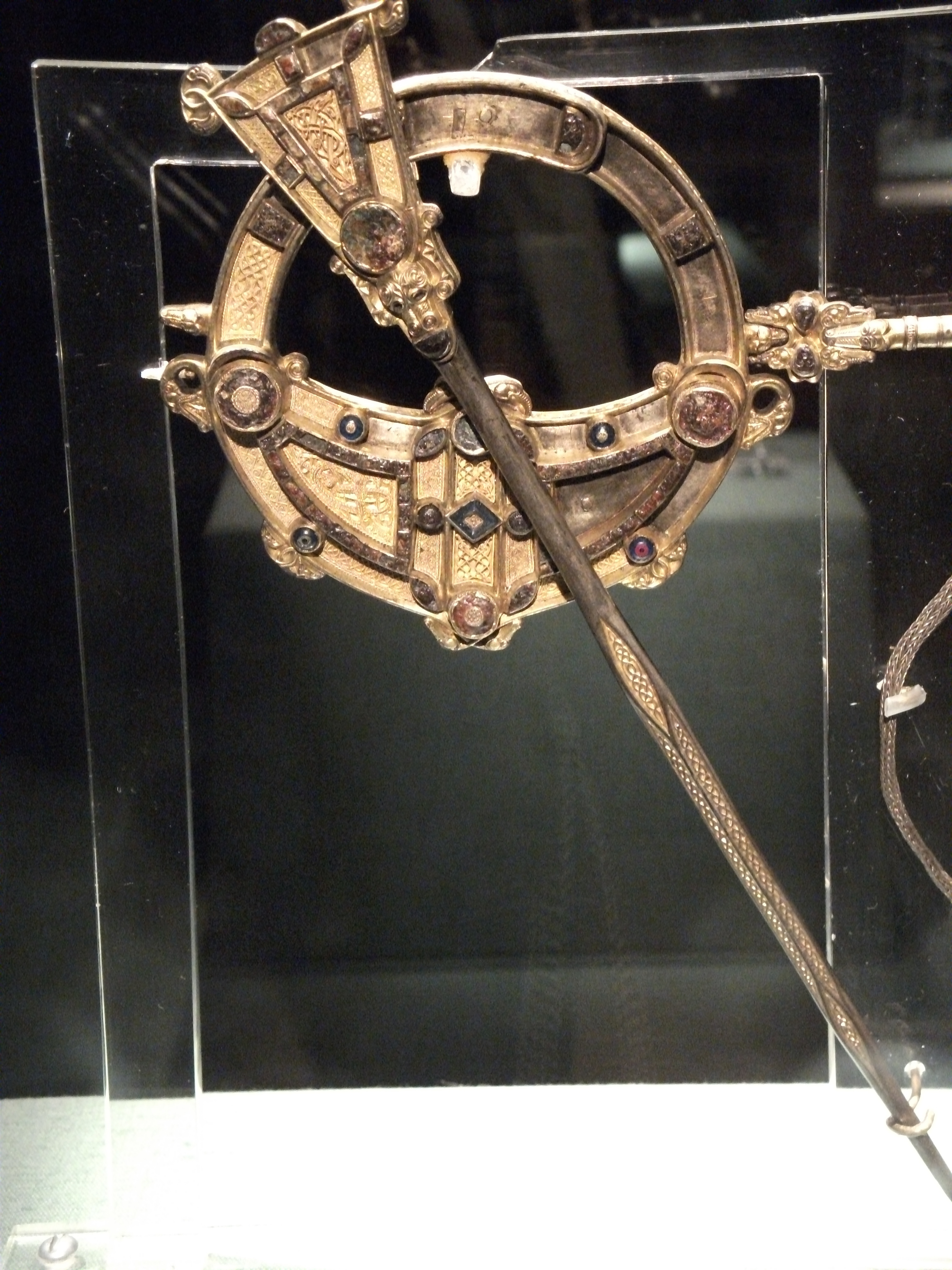
The 8th century Tara Brooch was exhibited at the Exhibition alongside Celtic Revival jewellery

Some limited Irish furniture industry was shown, including the linen and lace industry which the Irish could identify with. Also Bog wood carvings and Celtic Revival jewellery and other items were showcased, including the Tara Brooch, displayed with the modern imitations which were already fashionable. However, none of this inspired new Irish Industry.

There were a few American exhibits including Colt and Singer. Colt sold 40 pistols to the Irish prison system.

There were also some exhibits from Australia, including examples of gold from several fields.

It was the first Worlds Fair to exhibit fine arts paintings. Included in the fine arts section were the calotype photographs which had been taken by Edward King-Tenison, of Castle Tenison, Co. Roscommon of the villages and towns of Spain. E.K. Tenison had developed a technique which enabled him to enlarge his pictures to a size which were appropriate for exhibition.

British exhibits were limited to those companies who were looking for markets in Ireland, with little success. It was only during its last month that Dargan convinced the railways to offer a very inexpensive excursion rate and combined with an admission ticket for almost nothing, did some of the general Irish public get to see the crystal palace in Dublin.

== Outcome ==
The Illustrated Dublin Exhibition Catalogue commented:

"We consider the Great Exhibition held in Dublin in the year 1853, as even a larger contribution to the wealth of these kingdoms, than the Great Exhibition which took place in London in the year 1851; and we do not doubt that His Royal Highness Prince Albert, on visiting the Irish Capital, will earnestly rejoice that his indefatigable exertions and enlightened policy – which made that year memorable – have again borne rich fruitage, and again advanced the best interest of his country."

However, overall attendance was lower than expected at approximately 1.15 million visitors, leaving Dargan with a financial loss of approximately £9,000.
