= Francis Sylvester Mahony =

Irish journalist

Francis Sylvester Mahoney
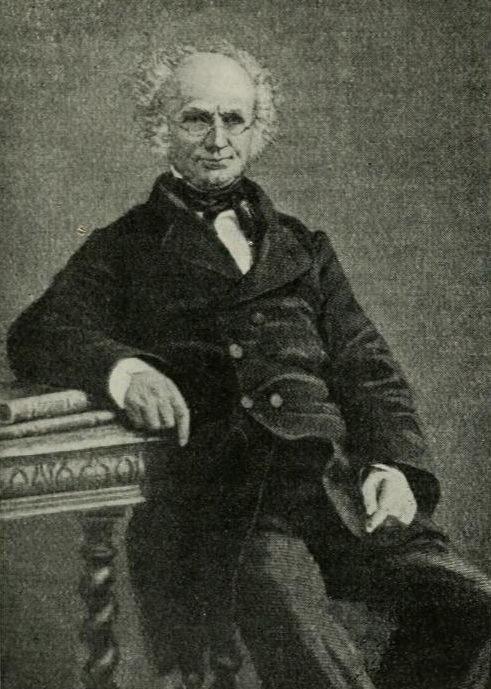
- Born: 31 December 1804; Cork, County Cork, Munster, Ireland
- Died: 18 May 1866 (aged 61); Paris, France
- Education: Clongowes Wood College; Abbey of Saint-Acheul
- Occupations: Humorist; journalist
- Parent(s): Martin Mahoney; Mary Reynolds
- Writing career
- Pen name: Father Prout

Francis Sylvester Mahony (31 December 1804 – 18 May 1866), also known by the pen name Father Prout, was an Irish humorist and journalist.

== Life ==
He was born in Cork, Ireland, to Martin Mahony and Mary Reynolds. He was educated at the Jesuit Clongowes Wood College, Kildare, and later in the College of Saint-Acheul, a similar school in Amiens, France and then at Rue de Sèvres, Paris, and later in Rome. He began teaching at the Jesuit school of Clongowes as master of rhetoric, but was soon after expelled. He then went to London, and became a leading contributor to Fraser's Magazine, under the signature of "Father Prout" (the original Father Prout, whom Mahony knew in his youth, born in 1757, was parish priest of Watergrasshill, County Cork). Mahony at one point was director of this magazine.

He was witty and learned in many languages. One form which his humour took was the professed discovery of the originals in Latin, Greek, or mediaeval French of popular modern poems and songs. Many of these jeux d'esprit were collected as Reliques of Father Prout. He pretended that these poems had been found in Fr. Prout's trunk after his death. He wittily described himself as "an Irish potato seasoned with Attic salt." Later he acted as foreign correspondent to various newspapers, and during the last eight years of his life, his articles formed a main attraction of The Globe.

Mahony spent the last two years of his life in a monastery and died in Paris reconciled to the Church.

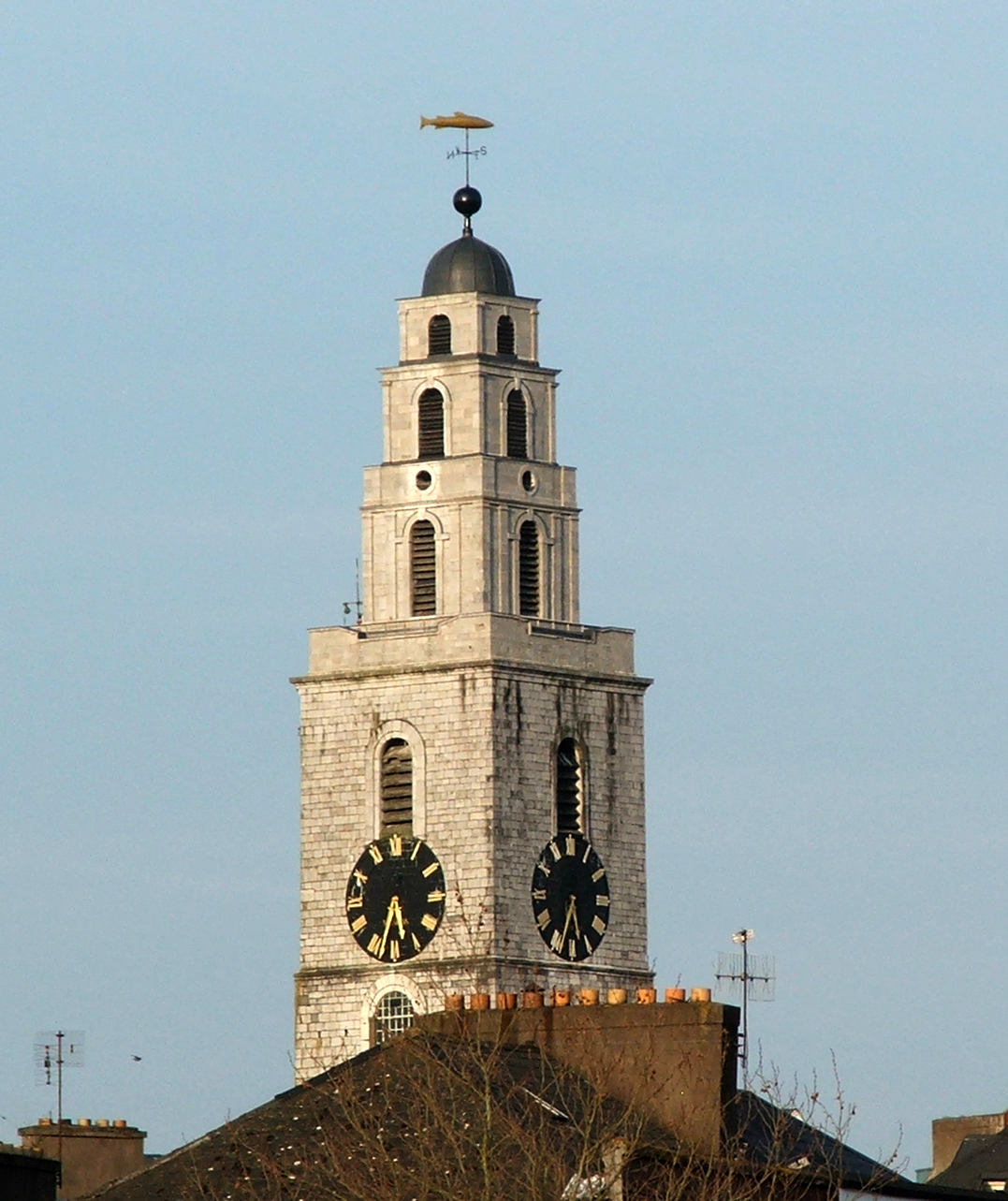
The clock tower of St. Anne's containing the Bells of Shandon

== "The Bells of Shandon" ==
In his native Cork Mahoney is best remembered for his poem "The Bells of Shandon" and his pen-name is synonymous with the city and the church of St. Anne's, Shandon.

With deep affection and recollection

I oft times think of those Shandon bells,
Whose sound so wild would in the days of childhood,
Fling round my cradle their magic spells,
On this I ponder when'eer I wander and thus grow
fonder sweet Cork of thee,
With thy bells of Shandon that sound so grand on,
The pleasant waters of the river Lee.
I've heard bells chiming, full many a chime in,
Tolling sublime in Cathedral shrine,
While at a glib rate, brass tongues would vibrate,
But all their music spoke naught like thine;
For memory dwelling on each proud swelling,
Of the belfry knelling its bold notes free,
Made the bells of Shandon sound far more grand on,
The pleasant waters of the river Lee.
I've heard bells tolling Old "Adrian's Mole"
in their thunder rolling from the Vatican,
And cymbals glorious, swinging uproarious
In the gorgeous turrets of Notre Dame,
But thy sounds were sweeter than the dome of Peter,
Flings o'er the Tiber, peelingly solemnly,
O, the bells of Shandon sound far more grand on,
The pleasant waters of the river Lee.
There's a bell in Moscow, while on tower and kiosk o!
In Saint Sophia the Turkman gets,
And loud in air calls men to prayer,
From the tapering summit of tall minarets.
Such empty phantom, I freely grant them,
But there is an anthem more dear to me,
'Tis the bells of Shandon that sound so grand on,

The pleasant waters of the river Lee.'

== Publications ==
The Reliques of Father Prout originally appeared in two volumes in 1836 with illustrations by Maclise. They were reissued in Bohn's Illustrated Library in 1860. Another volume, Final Reliques, was edited by Douglas Jerrold and published in 1876. The Works of Father Prout, edited by Charles Kent, was published in 1881. Facts and Figures from Italy (1847) was made from his Rome letters to the London Daily News.

== Graham Greene reference ==
The protagonist of Graham Greene’s Travels With My Aunt mentions regretfully his life's unfulfilled ambition "to be recognised as an English Mahony and celebrate Southwood as he celebrated Shandon".
