= North Main Street (Cork) =

Street in Cork, Ireland

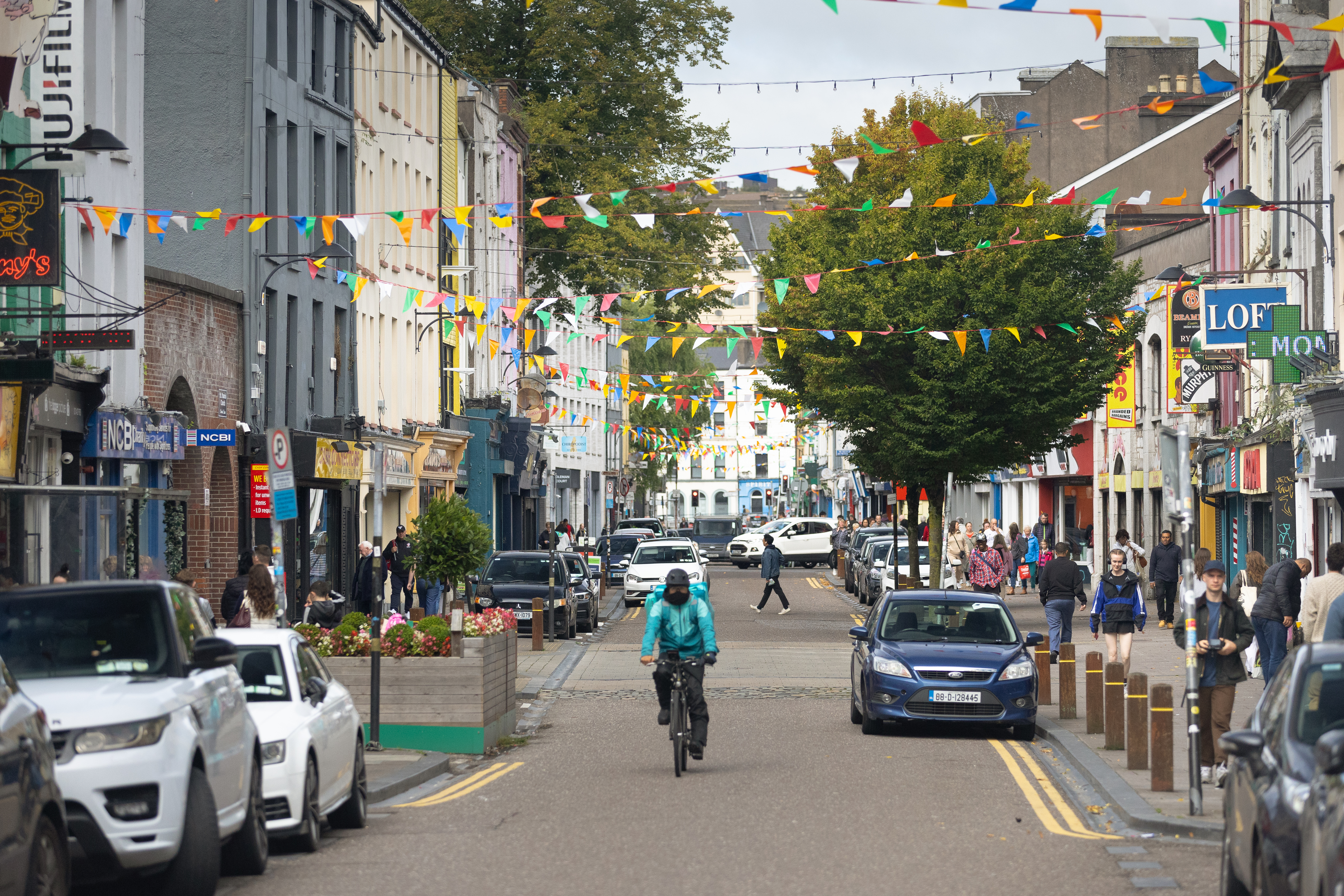
- North Main Street in 2023, as seen from south side
- Interactive map of North Main Street
- Native name: An Phríomhshráid Thuaidh (Irish)
- Length: 300 m (980 ft)
- Width: 17 metres (56 ft)
- Location: Cork, Ireland
- Postal code: T12
- Coordinates: 51.89984°N 8.47852°W
- north end: North Gate Bridge, Kyrl's Quay, Bachelor's Quay
- Major junctions: Shandon Street, Washington Street
- south end: Castle Street, Liberty Street, South Main Street

Construction
- Inauguration: 13th century

Other
- Known for: St. Peter's Cork, shops

North Main Street (Irish: An Phríomhshráid Thuaidh) is a street and retail area in Cork City, Ireland. Joined by bridge with South Main Street in the 12th century, it formed the main thoroughfare within the original city walls of medieval Cork. As of the 21st century, it is predominantly occupied by commercial and retail premises, some of which are built upon earlier structures.

== History ==
Medieval Cork City was separated in two by channels of the River Lee, with the northern part of the main street being the North Main Street and the southern island containing the South Main Street, both of which were connected by a bridge built in 1190. It is not believed that North Main Street was extensively inhabited until the 13th century, following the walling of the northern island in sandstone, after which it became the main street of medieval Cork. At this time, the population of the walled city consisted primarily of Anglo-Norman merchant families. Property on North Main Street was divided into strips running perpendicular to the street, known as burgage plots.

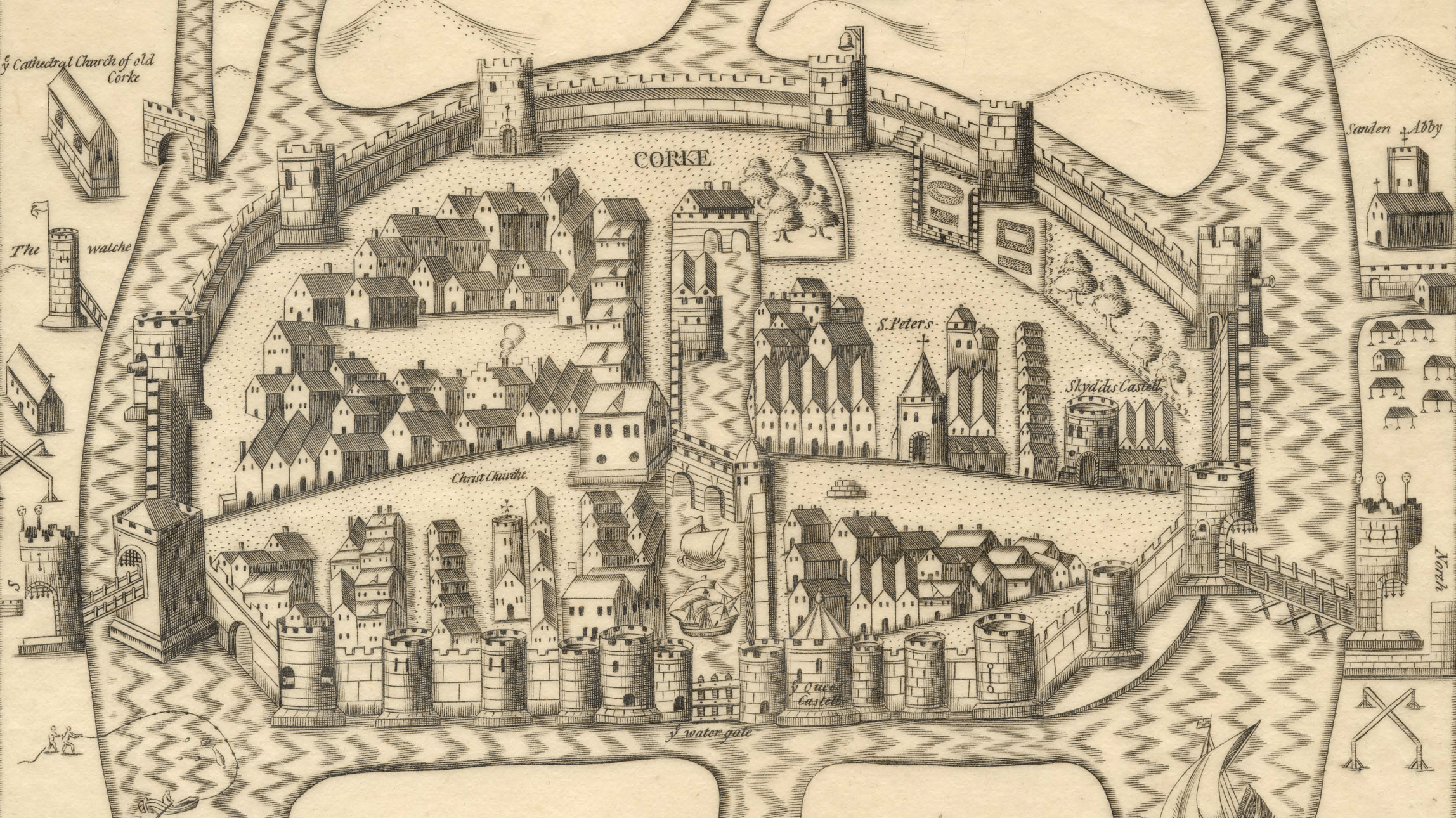
16th century map of Cork, which includes St Peter's Church and Skiddy's Castle on North Main Street

A number of archaeological excavations of the area have revealed the remains of houses which were Anglo-Norman in style, made mainly of timber and wattle. The building of houses from timber posed a fire risk, and declined after May 1622, when a lightning strike on North Main Street resulted in a loss of 1500 houses in the city. Other 20th century excavations focused on Skiddy's Castle, a 15th century tower house which became a gunpowder magazine for a period, prior to its demolition in the late 18th century.

At the top of the North Main street in medieval Cork was the North Gate Bridge and adjacent North Gate Castle, which later saw use as a jail. The street was also the principal street of the parish of St. Peter's, the parish church now in use as the Cork Vision Centre. In the 1820s, St Patrick's Street began to overtake North Main Street as the primary business street of the city. Slum clearances were conducted around North Main Street in the 1850s and late 1870s, the former "cosmetic rather than socially ameliorative," the latter as part of a rehousing initiative.

A number of businesses on North Main Street were destroyed by fire in late November 1920, shortly before the Burning of Cork on 11 December 1920.

== Later development ==
North Main street has undergone some redevelopment in the late 20th and early 21st centuries, with the construction of a cinema, apartment blocks and a shopping centre. A heritage conservation project was carried out on the street in the mid-1990s. The street was also included in the "Painting and Facade Scheme" in 2016, which received grant aid from Cork City Council to give incentive to building owners in some parts of the city centre to paint their buildings. A number of groups, including the 'North Main Street Traders' Association', have advocated further initiatives to 'rejuvenate' the street - following 'a decline' in commercial activity in the early 21st century.
