= Irish Industrial Exhibition =

1852 world's fair

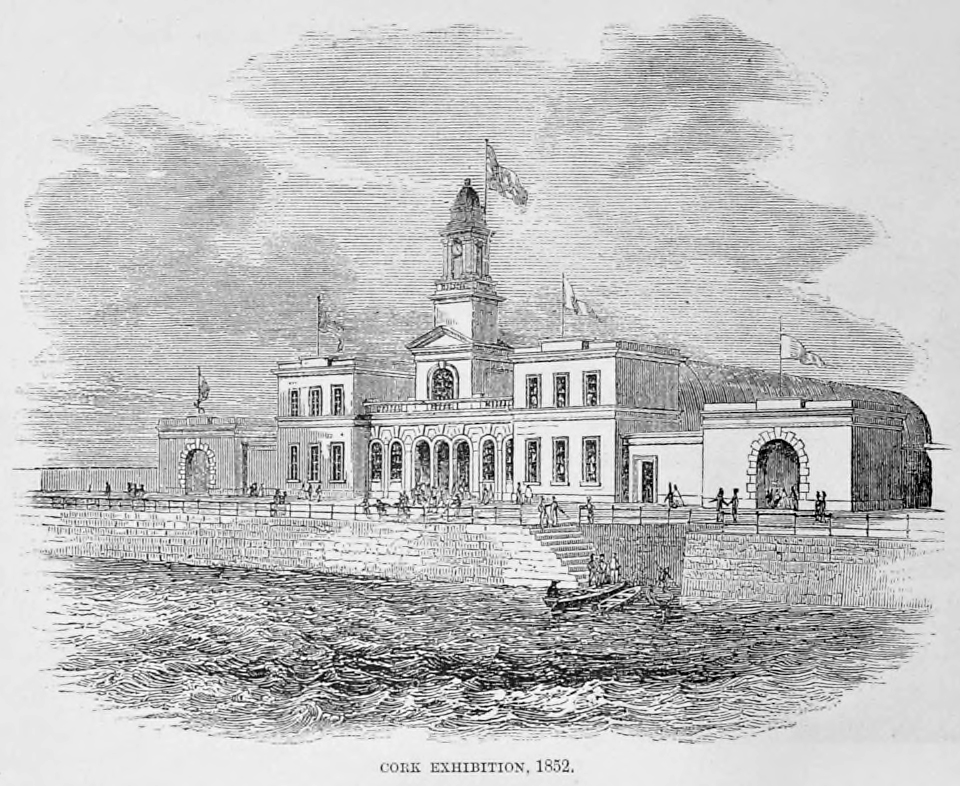
- Cork Exhibition, 1852

Overview
- BIE-class: Unrecognized exposition
- Name: Irish Industrial Exhibition

Location
- Country: United Kingdom of Great Britain and Ireland
- City: Cork
- Coordinates: 51.8971°N 8.4654°W

Timeline
- Opening: 10 June 1852

The Irish Industrial Exhibition was a world's fair held in Cork in 1852, the first to be held in Ireland (then part of the United Kingdom). It was opened on 10 June by the Lord Lieutenant, the Earl of Eglinton.

Taking place two years after the Great Famine ended, and following a significant increase in Cork's population due to an influx of people fleeing the countryside the fair stemmed partly from attempts to revive local industries.

It was housed in the Albert Quay area in a cruciform building designed by John Benson with three wings given over to industrial exhibits such as whiskey, projectile shells, hydraulic presses, Valentia slate and gingham and a fourth to fine arts.

== Fine arts ==
There was a fine arts hall which included canvas and glass paintings, sculpture and Irish antiquities. Work on display included items by sculptures Thomas Kirk, John Edward Jones, Patrick MacDowell, Joseph Robinson Kirk and John Henry Foley. John Hogan had works both in the main art section, but additionally his The Dead Christ was in a separate darkened room.

== Aftermath ==
Benson achieved success with his design for the exhibition building and this acted as a template for the opera house to be built in Cork. He was also asked to be the architect for the world's fair in Dublin the next year. However, the aim of reviving industries was largely unsuccessful and census returns showed a decrease in males employed in manufacturing.
