= Shandon, Cork =

Shandon Seandún
- City district
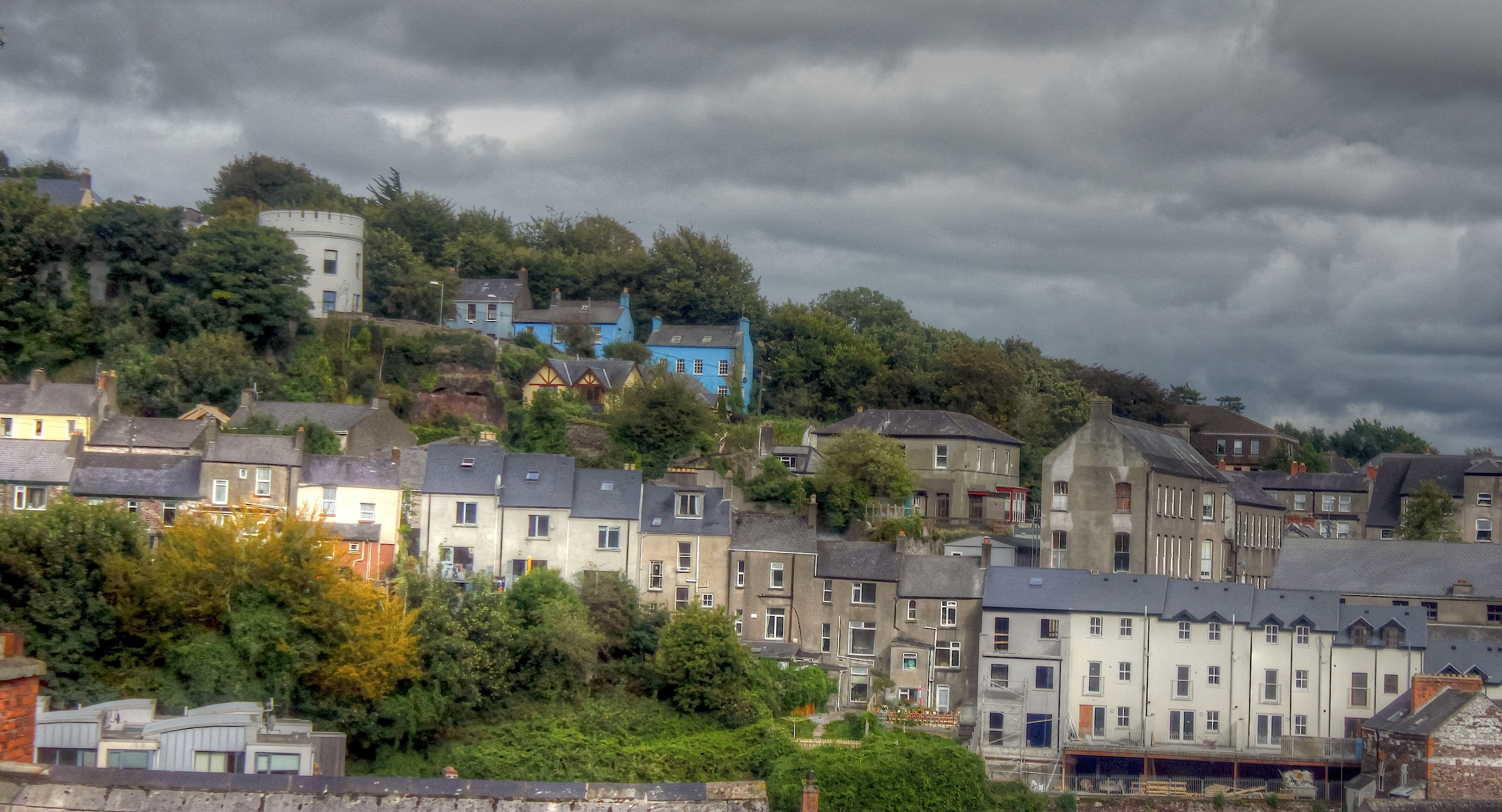
- Houses in the Shandon area

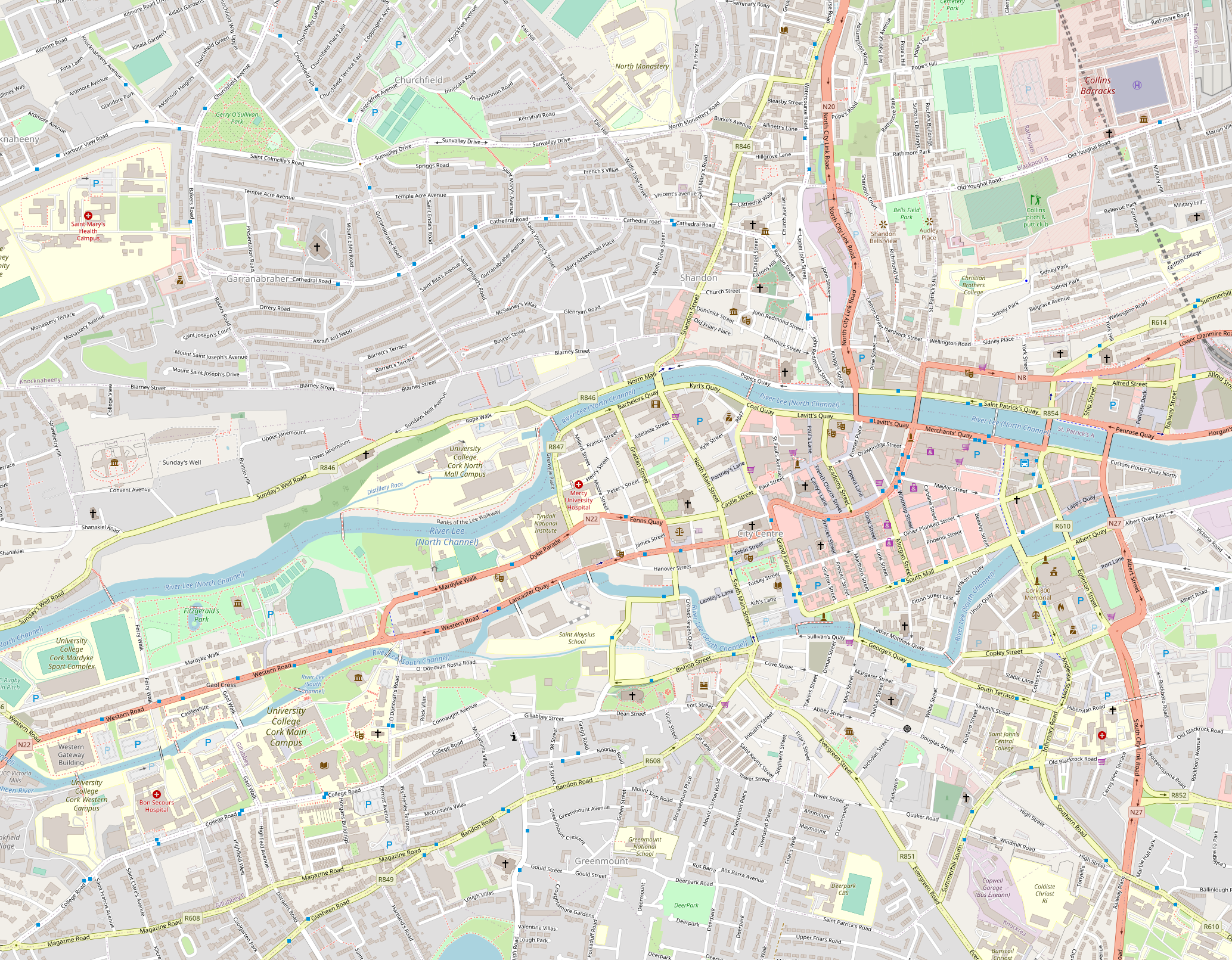
- Location in Cork
- Coordinates: 51°54′11″N 8°28′41″W
- Country: Ireland
- Province: Munster
- City: Cork
- Time zone: UTC+0 (WET)
  - Summer (DST): UTC-1 (IST (WEST))

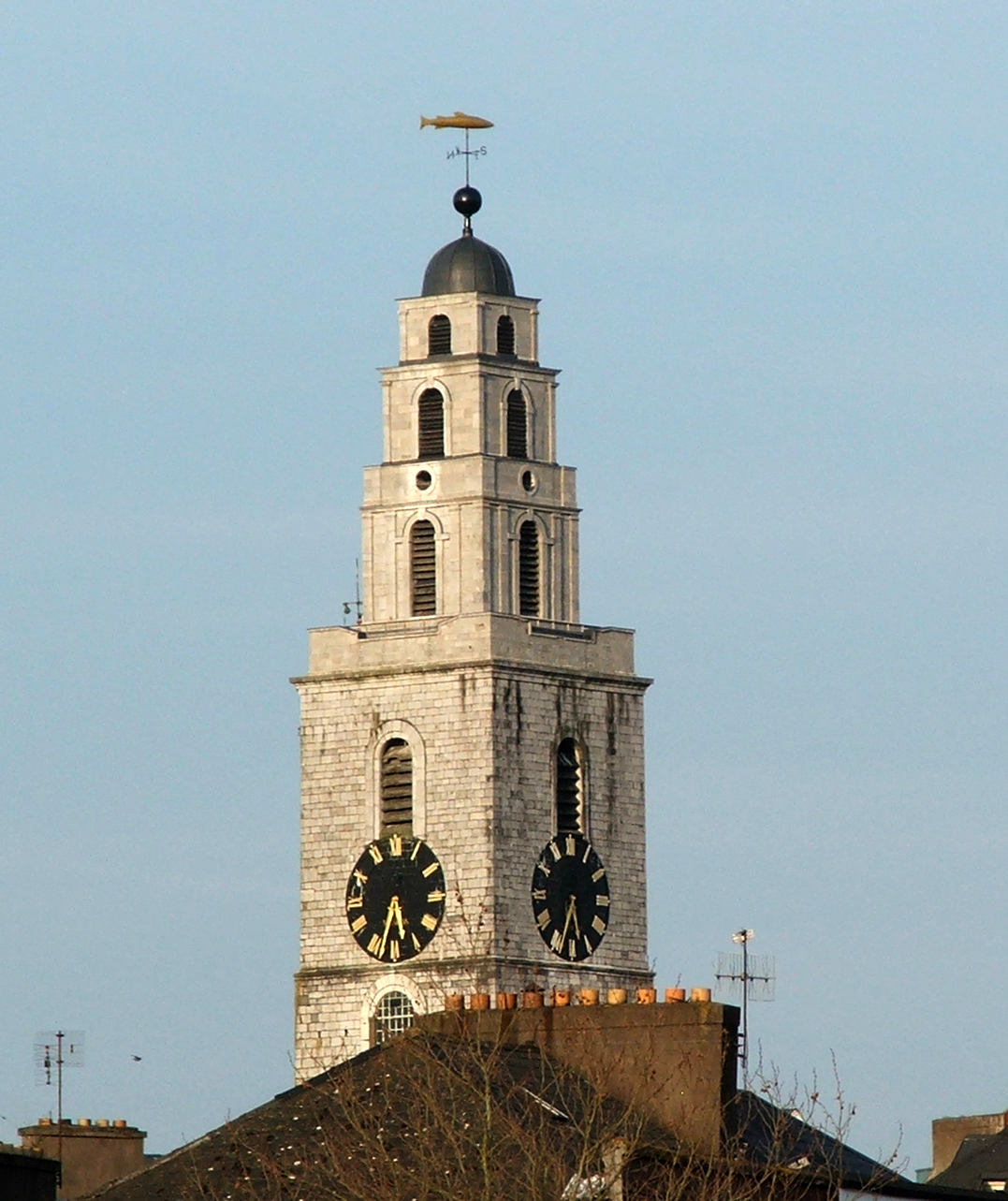
The clock tower of St Anne's church containing the Bells of Shandon

Shandon (Irish: An Seandún meaning "the old fort") is a district on the north-side of Cork city. Shandon lies north of the River Lee and North Gate Bridge, the northernmost point of the medieval city. Several landmarks of Cork's north-side are located in the area, including the bell tower of the Church of St Anne, the Cathedral of St Mary and St Anne, Saint Mary’s Dominican Church & Priory, and Firkin Crane Arts Centre.

Shandon is referred to in the song "The Bells of Shandon", which was written by Francis Sylvester Mahony under the pen name of "Father Prout". Shandon Street is a principal street in the area, and was originally called Mallow Lane. Shandon is part of the Dáil constituency of Cork North-Central.

== History ==
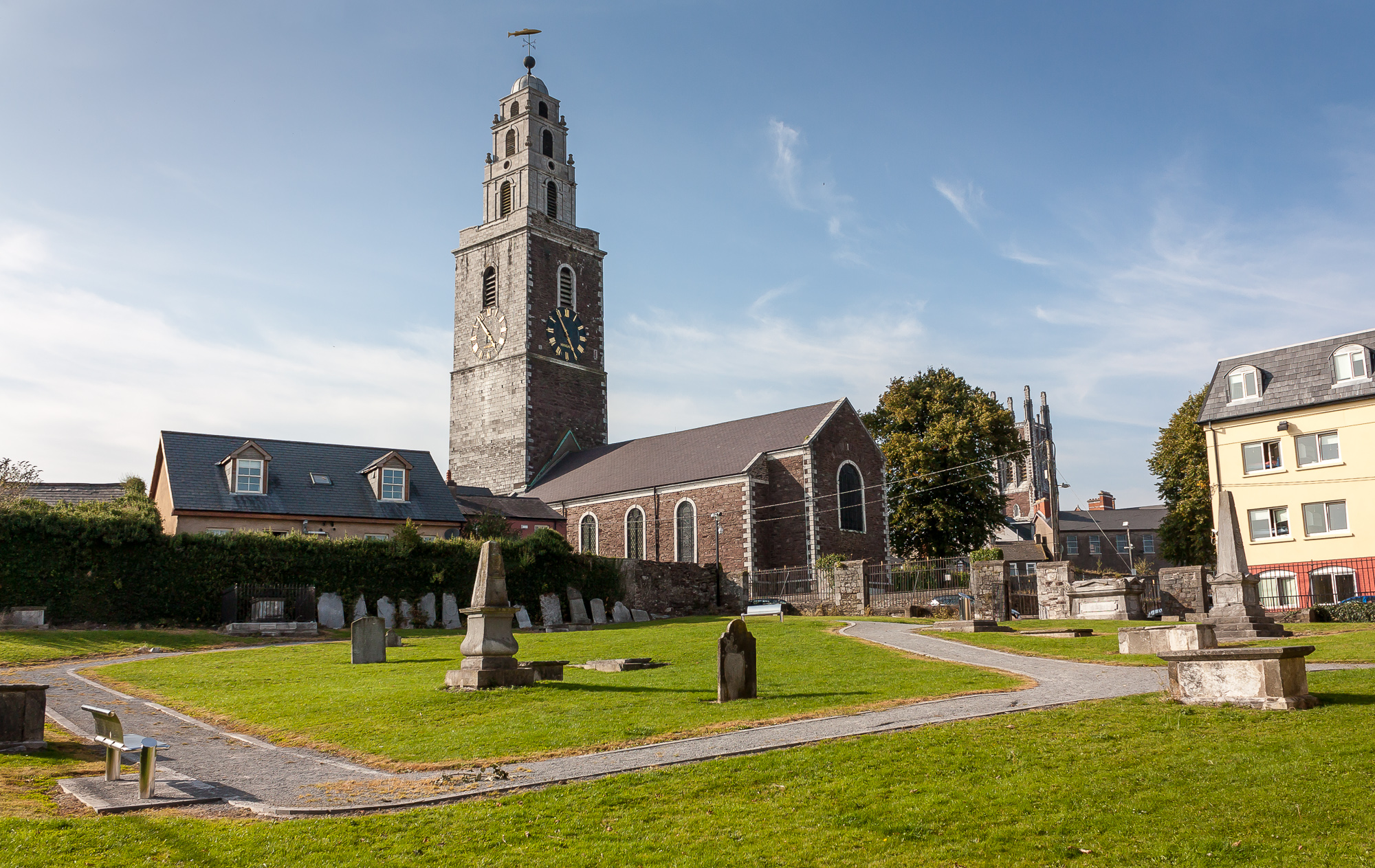
Church and steeple of St. Anne's Shandon

Shandon was one of a number of settlements in and around ancient Cork, and takes its name from an old fort (sean dún) in the area. A medieval church dedicated to St. Mary was built close to the site of the fort, and referred to in 12th century texts as 'St. Mary of the Mountain'. A later castle, built on or close to the site of the more ancient fort, became the official residence of the President of Munster from the 16th century. This castle (Shandon Castle) and the original church of St. Mary (St. Mary of the Mountain) were both destroyed during the Siege of Cork in the late 17th century.

The eponymous Shandon Street, originally known as Mallow Lane, was established by the Anglo-Normans as a way to give access to North Gate drawbridge.

== Events ==
Shandon Street Festival is an annual event which takes place during the summer.

== Demographics ==
As of the 2016 census, the Shandon area (including Shandon A and Shandon B electoral divisions) included 3144 residents. Of these, 50% were Catholic, 16% were other religions, 26% had no religion, and 8% had not stated a religion.

== Landmarks ==
Religious buildings in the area include the Cathedral of St Mary and St Anne (the Catholic cathedral and mother church of the Diocese of Cork and Ross, known locally as the "North Cathedral"), the Church of St Anne (a Church of Ireland church known as "St Anne's, Shandon"), and Saint Mary's Dominican Church (a Catholic church of the Order of Preachers on Popes Quay).

Other landmarks in the area include the Firkin Crane (a theatre and dance venue), Cork Butter Museum, the Shandon Craft Centre, and Skiddy's Almshouse.

== People associated with Shandon ==
- John Arnott (1814–1898), 1st Baronet Arnott of Woodlands, Shandon
- William Black (1841–1898), Scottish novelist who wrote Shandon Bells in 1883
- Patrick Hennessy (1915–1980), painter
- Jack Lynch (1917–1999), Taoiseach
- Ignatius O'Brien (1857–1930), 1st Baron Shandon, lawyer, politician
- Jimmy McCarthy (b.1953), songwriter of "The Mad Lady and Me" which mentions "Shandon Bells" in the chorus
