= Shandon, Dublin =

Residential area on the northside of Dublin city, Ireland

Coordinates: 53.365312°N 6.278538°W

Shandon is a small collection of roads on Dublin's Northside within the district of Phibsboro. It consists of three terraces of Edwardian (Victorian style) houses along the banks of the Royal Canal, built around 1926.

The area was expanded in 1952 by the addition of a terrace of concrete houses, Shandon Gardens, and more recently Shandon Crescent and Shandon Green.

The area is home to Shandon Pitch and Putt Club, an 18-hole course affiliated to the Pitch and Putt Union of Ireland.
