= Skiddy's Almshouse =

Oldest inhabited building in the city of Cork, almshouse

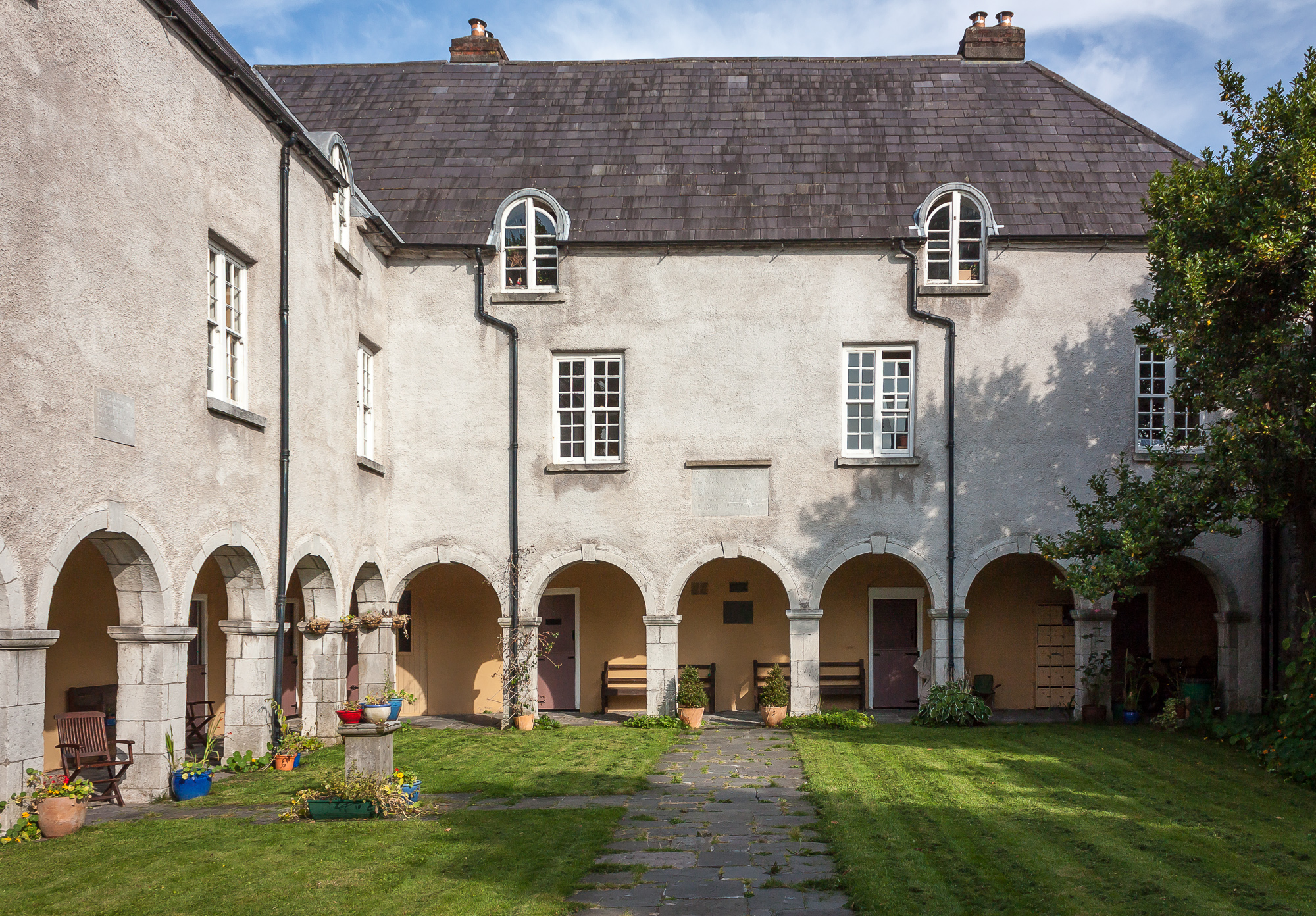
- The Arcade

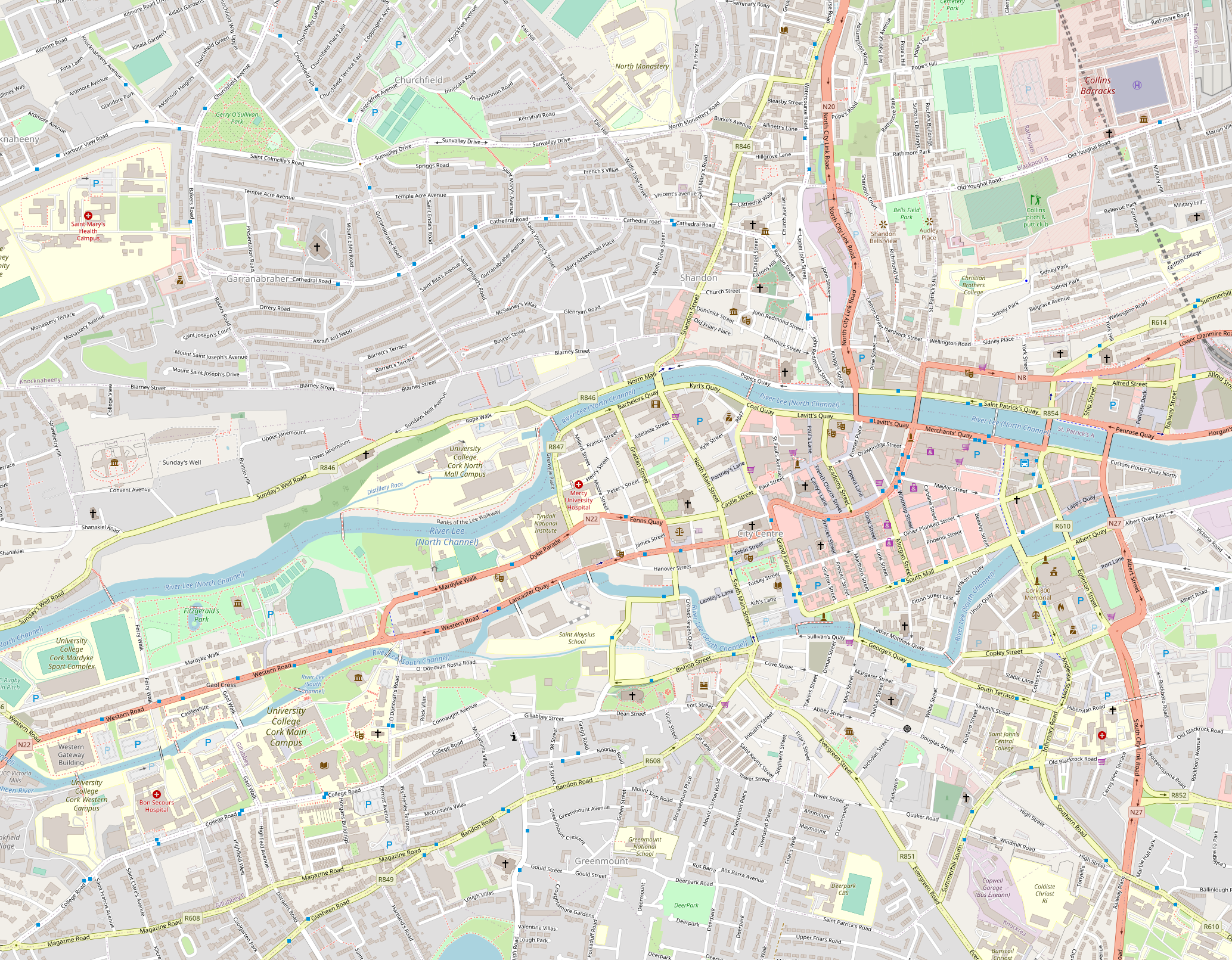
- Location within Cork Central

Religion
- Affiliation: Church of Ireland

Location
- Location: Shandon, Cork, County Cork, Ireland
- Interactive map of Skiddy's Almshouse
- Coordinates: 51.9034°N 8.4752°W

Architecture
- Architect: Frank Murphy (architect) Restoration 1975
- Founder: Stephen Skiddy
- Completed: 1719

Skiddy's Almshouse is the oldest inhabited building in the city of Cork. It was built in 1718 and finished in 1719.

It was the second almshouse built using a bequest from Stephen Skiddy for the city's poor, either Catholic or Church of Ireland. The first building, located near North Gate Bridge, was replaced by the end of 1718 following complaints of its being a poor source for fresh air and being too narrow. Skiddy was a wealthy Cork-born wine merchant, who in his will of 1584 bequeathed an annual payment for the benefit of his Almshouse. This annual payment began when Skiddy's wife died in 1606. The payment is made to this day by The Vintners Federation in London to Skiddy's charity. The Almshouse was also funded by Roger Bettridge when he included it in his will in 1717.

The Almshouse was built on a corner of the medieval Saint Mary's Churchyard, the building was once part of a campus including the Green Coat Hospital and School. The other buildings were demolished in the 1950s. The Almshouse was saved from demolition by the Cork Preservation Society in the 1960s with an award-winning restoration completed in 1975 by the architect Frank Murphy. In 2000, the CPS Sold the Almshouse to the Social Housing Development Company. This restoration, which saw Murphy (as architect) win an RIAI Europa Nostra award, was followed by a second restoration which completed in 2005. Skiddy's Almshouse is now one of the very few surviving eighteenth-century institutional buildings in Cork.

The Almshouse is an L-shaped building with a stone arcade enclosed by a ten-foot wall with a large iron gate. As of 2011, it housed 15 people.
