= Church of St Anne, Shandon =

St Anne's Church, Shandon
- Eaglais Naomh Áine, An Seandún
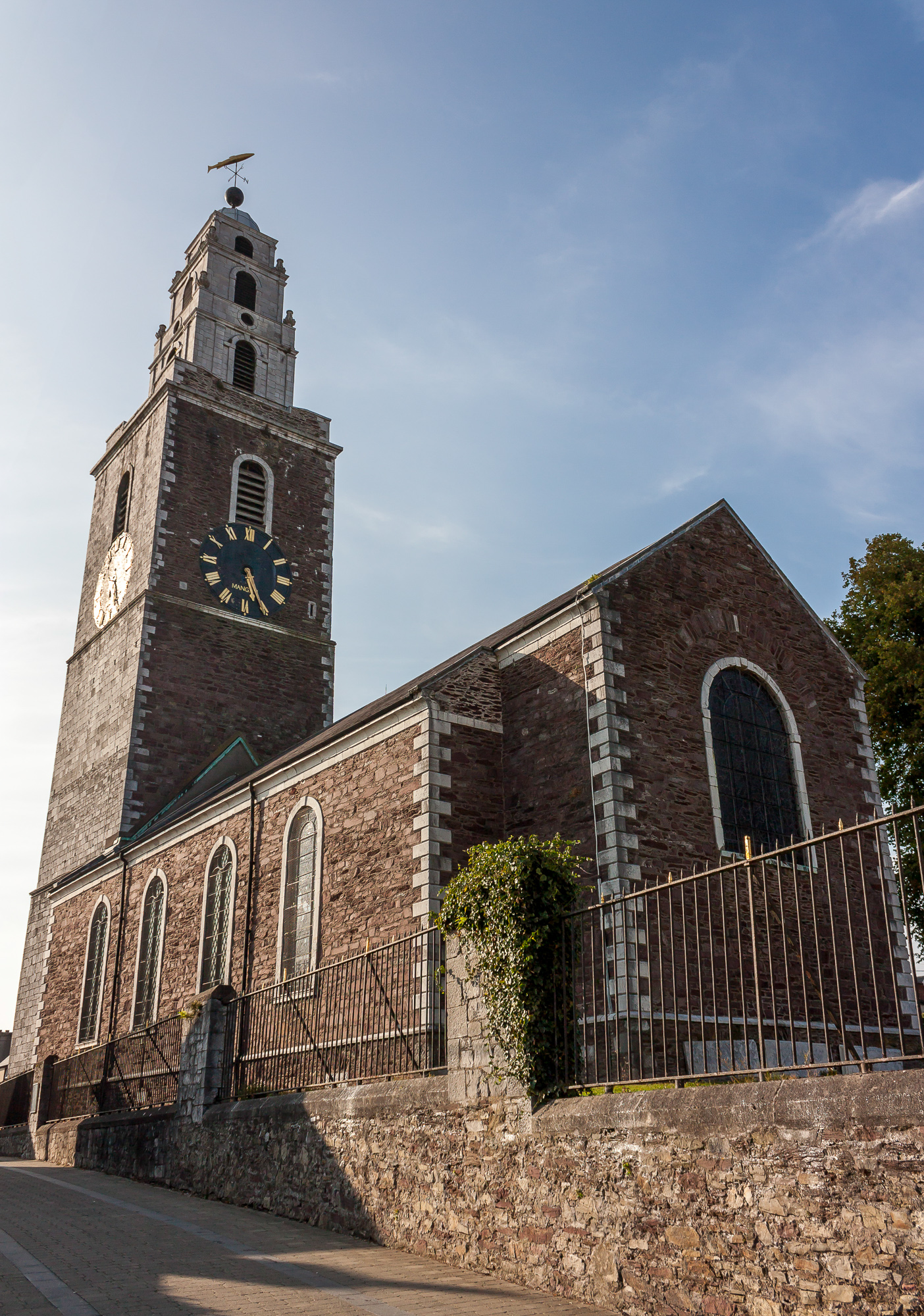
- Saint Anne's Church as seen from Church Street

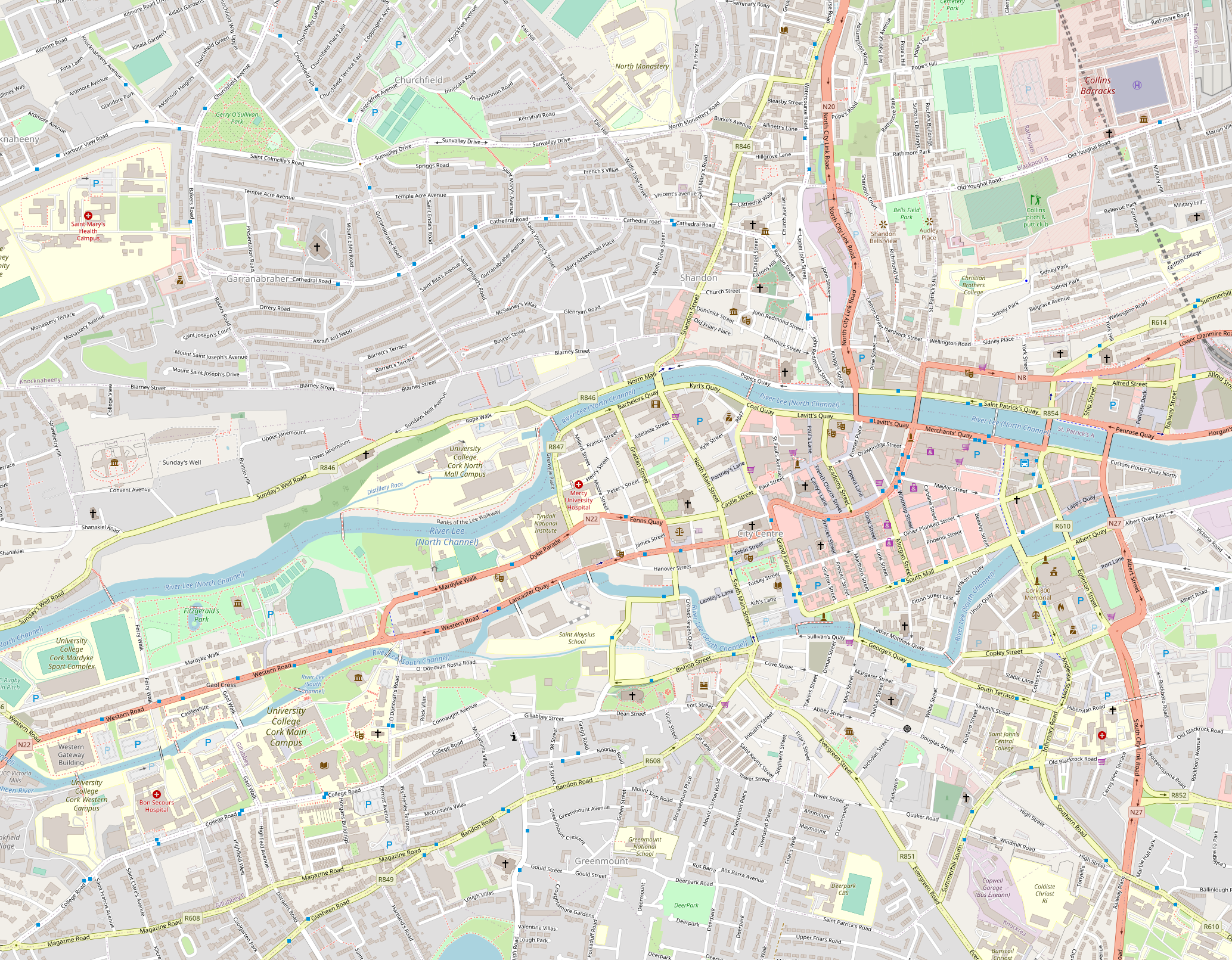
- 51°54′12″N 08°28′34″W
- Location: Church Street, Cork
- Country: Ireland
- Denomination: Church of Ireland

History
- Founded: 1726 (current structure)
- Dedication: Saint Anne

Architecture
- Functional status: active
- Style: vernacular

Specifications
- Materials: limestone, sandstone, slate

Administration
- Diocese: Cork, Cloyne and Ross
- Parish: Cork, St Anne's Shandon

The Church of St Anne is a Church of Ireland church located in the Shandon district of Cork city in Ireland. Built between 1722 and 1726, it is situated on a hill overlooking the River Lee. The church tower is a noted landmark and symbol of the city, and the church bells were popularised in a 19th-century song.

== History ==
The name Shandon comes from the Irish, Sean Dún, meaning "old fort". A medieval church dedicated to St Mary existed close to the site of this fort, and is mentioned in the decretals of Pope Innocent III in 1199 as "St Mary on the Mountain". This church stood until the Williamite wars when it was destroyed during the siege of Cork (1690). In 1693 this was replaced by a church, also dedicated to St Mary, and was located at the bottom of Mallow Lane, modern day Shandon Street. Due to population growth, it was decided to build anew on this ancient site and so in 1722 the present Church of St Anne, Shandon was constructed.

The church of St Anne attained full parochial status in 1772, when Rev. Arthur Hyde (great-great-grandfather of Douglas Hyde) was appointed its first Rector.

As it was built with two types of stone (red sandstone from the original Shandon Castle which stood nearby, and limestone taken from the derelict Franciscan Abbey which stood on the North Mall), some sources draw a connection between the red and white materials and the colours used to represent the city. The distinct colours are recorded in a rhyme collected by 19th-century antiquary Thomas Crofton Croker, which he attributes to 18th-century Catholic priest and writer Father Arthur O'Leary:

Party-coloured, like the people,
Red and white stands Shandon Steeple

— The Popular Songs of Ireland (1839)

== Features ==
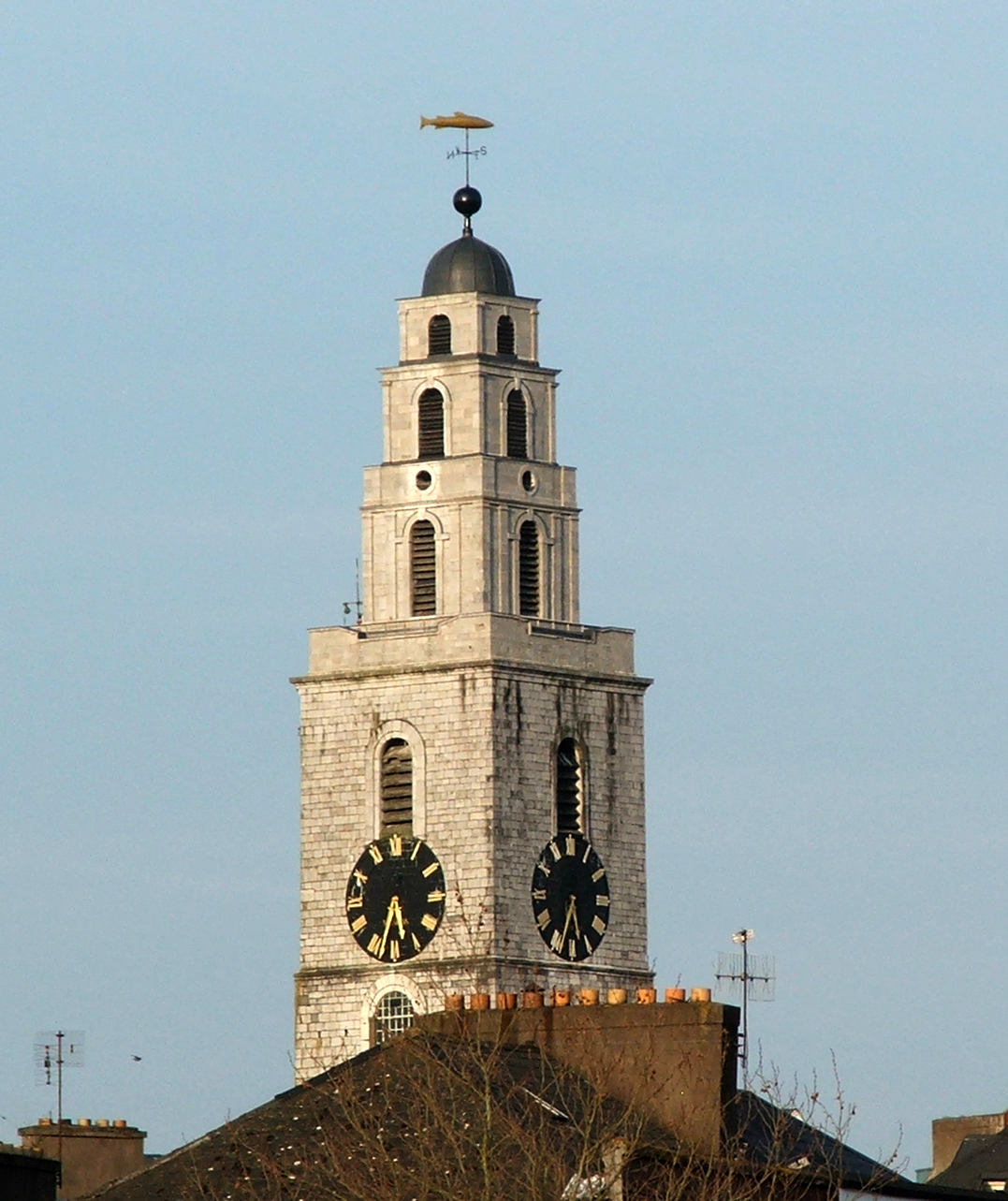
The clock tower of St Anne's church, containing the Bells of Shandon

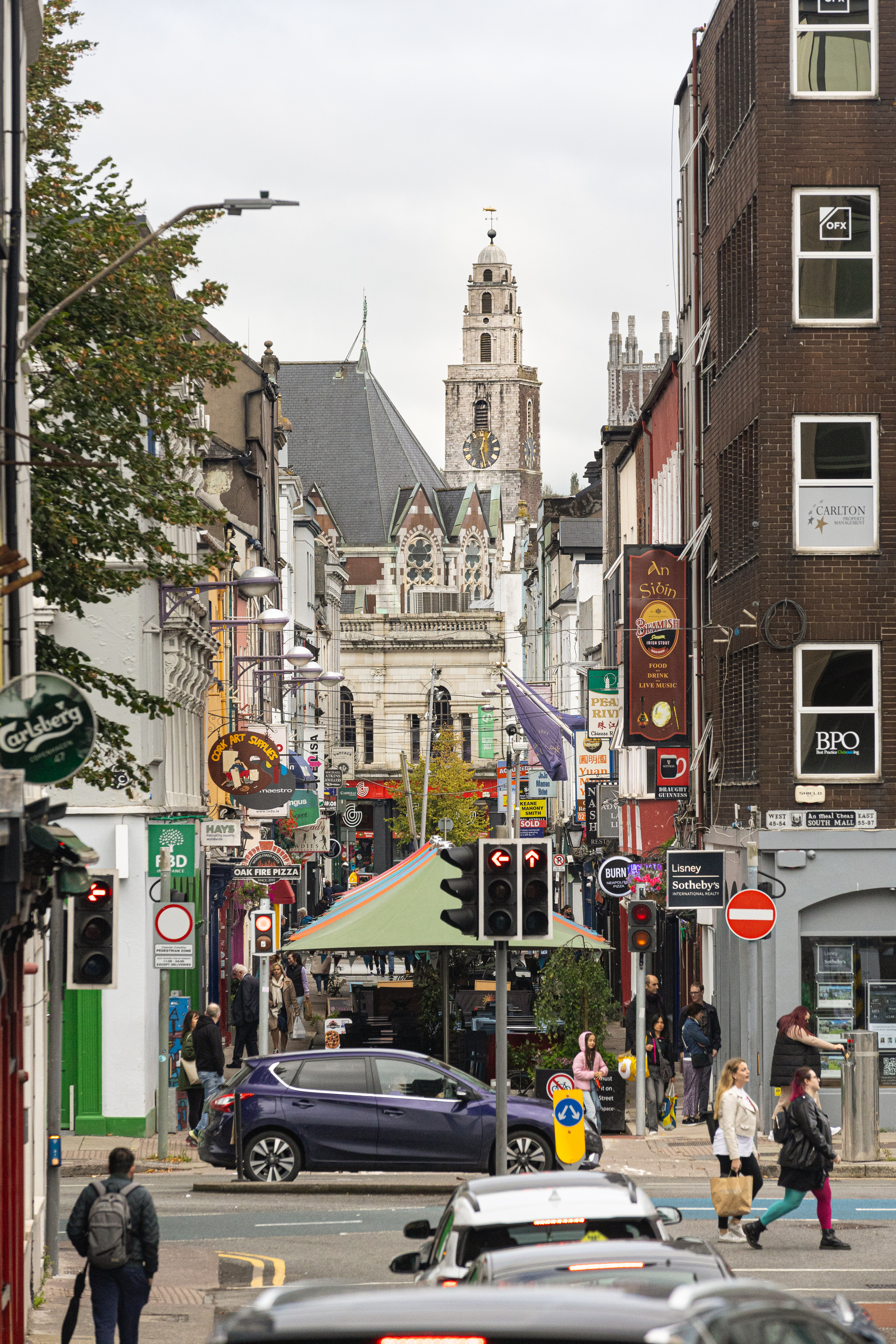
Seen from the streets of Cork, the church's tower has become one of the city's symbols

=== Bells ===
The church is noted for its 8 bells, immortalised in the song "The Bells of Shandon" by Francis Sylvester Mahony. The largest weighs a little over 1.5 tons and was originally cast by Abel Rudhall of Gloucester. To reduce vibration, they were placed in a fixed position. They first rang on 7 December 1752. They have been recast twice: in 1865 and 1906. Today, visitors can climb to the first floor and ring the bells themselves, via an Ellacombe apparatus.

The original inscriptions are retained on each bell:

- When us you ring we'll sweetly sing
- God preserve the Church and King
- Health and prosperity to all our benefactors
- Peace and good neighbourhood
- Prosperity to the city and trade thereof
- We were all cast at Gloucester in England by Abel Rudhall 1750
- Since generosity has opened our mouths our tongues shall sing aloud its praise
- I to the Church the living call and to the grave do summon all

=== Tower ===
The walls of the building are 2 m (7 ft) thick and the height to the tower is 36.5 m (120 ft). This is extended a further 15 m (50 ft) for the "pepper pot" adornment on the tower. The McOsterich family were involved with the design and erection of this tower and to this day a special privilege is afforded them. Whenever a member of the family marries, anywhere in the world, the bells ring out in their honour. On top of this pepper pot is a weather vane in the form of a salmon, representing the fishing of the River Lee.

The fish placed above the tower is mentioned in Cork band Five Go Down to the Sea?'s song "There's a fish on top of Shandon (swears he's Elvis)".

=== Clock ===
The clock of the tower is known to Corkonians as "The Four Faced Liar" because, depending on the angle of the viewer, and the effects of wind on the hands on a given face, the time may not appear to correspond perfectly on each face. Due to maintenance issues, the clock was stopped in 2013, but plans to fund repair were agreed in May 2014, and the clock restarted in September 2014.

=== Font ===
The christening font, dated 1629, is a relic from the church destroyed in the siege of Cork in 1690 and bears the inscription, "Walter Elinton and William Ring made this pant (Note: 'Pant' is Scots/Northern English term for a public fountain or well.) at their charges". Within is a pewter bowl dated 1773.

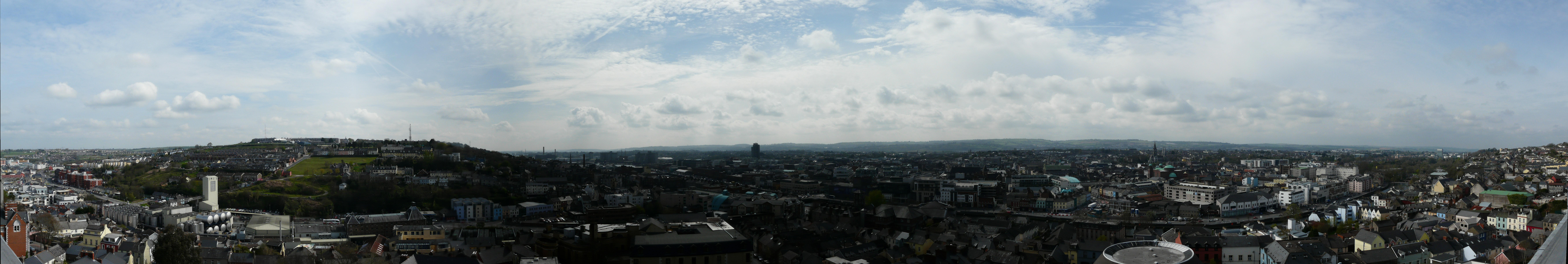
Panoramic view from the observation area of the bell tower
