= Cork Butter Museum =

- Músaem Ime Chorcaí
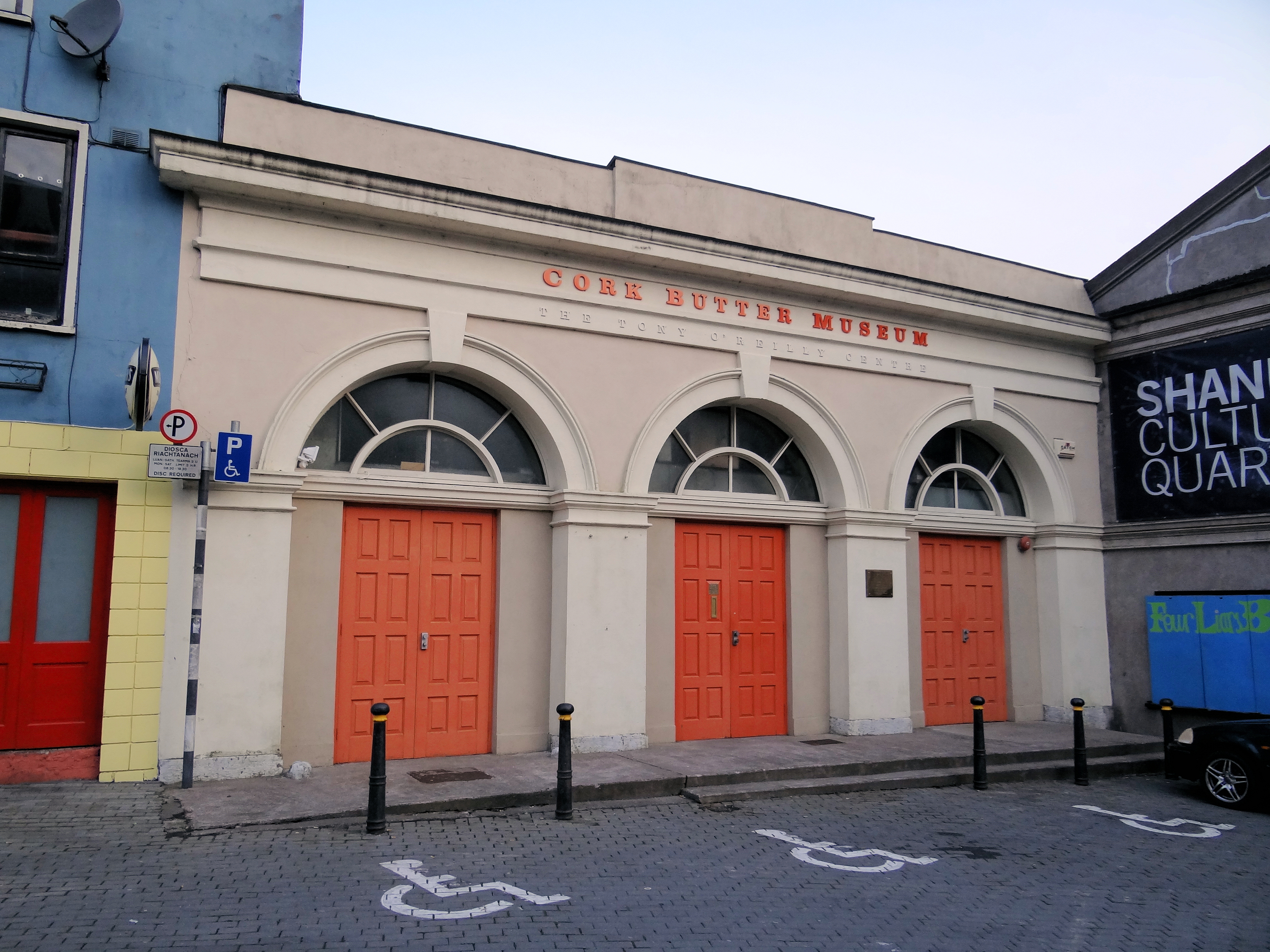

- Location within Ireland
- Established: 1985
- Location: Cork, Ireland
- Coordinates: 51.9027°N 8.4767°W
- Type: Butter museum
- Curator: Peter Foynes
- Website: thebuttermuseum.com

The Cork Butter Museum is a museum in Cork city in Ireland which documents the history of butter production and sale in County Cork. It is housed in the former Cork Butter Market.

== History ==
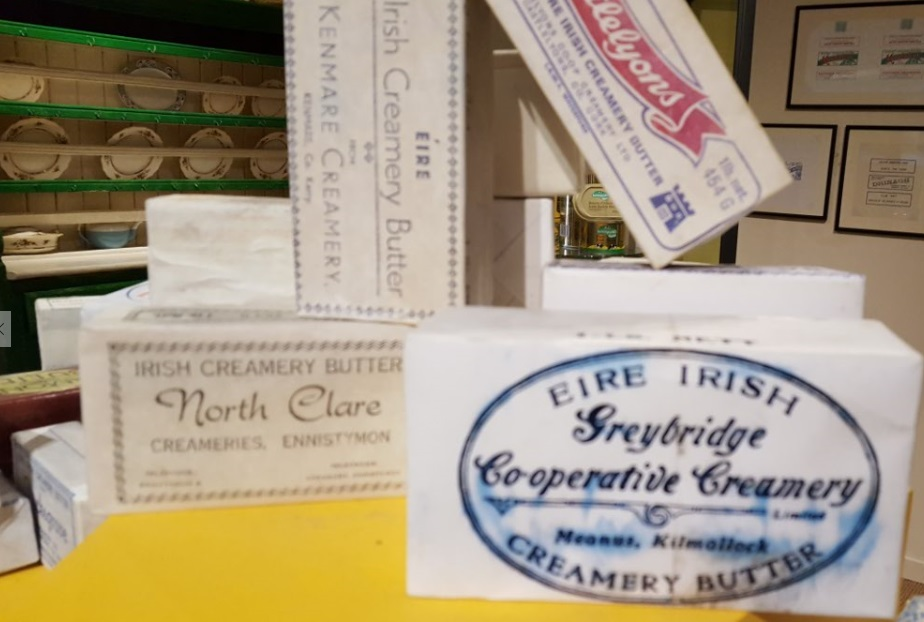
A display of early butter brands in the Cork Butter Museum

The Cork Butter Market building is situated in the Shandon area of the city, with the building dating from 1849. Shandon was the largest Shambles (open-air butcheries) in Ireland, and the Exchange was located within this commercial area. During the Exchange's peak in the 19th century, Cork was the largest exporter of butter in the world, with butter exported as far as Australia and India.

== Exhibits ==
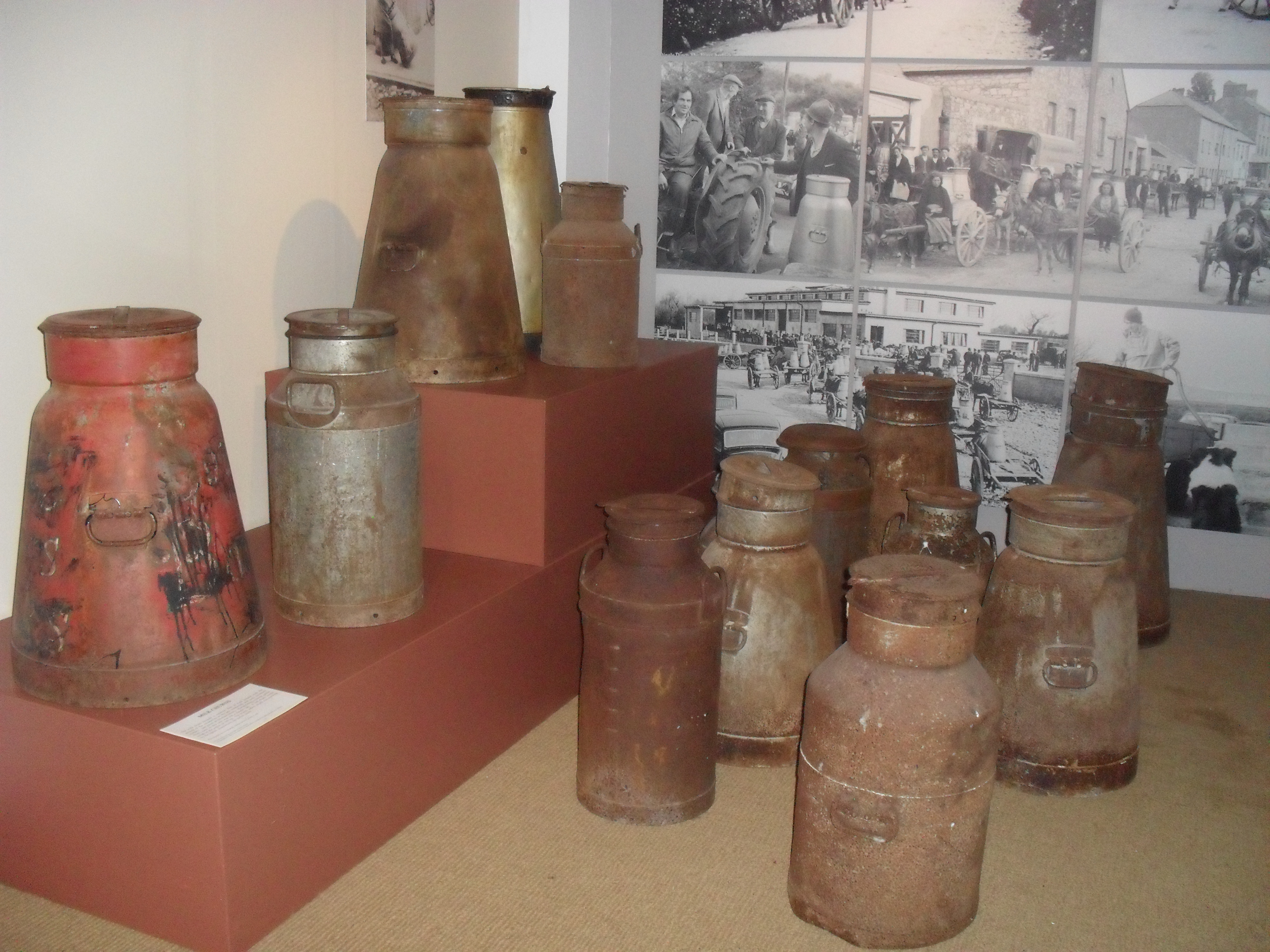
A selection of steel churns in the butter museum.

The museum documents the role of the butter trade in Ireland over the course of history. The museum has displays covering the international Butter Exchange in the 19th century, the domestic production of butter, and the operations of Kerrygold in more recent times. The displays document elements of Irish commercial, social and domestic history. The exhibitions are intended to bring the visitor through various elements of butter production, from dairy cattle farming, to the documents and artifacts relating to the commercial butter trade. The Museum's collections include dairy paraphernalia, including a container of thousand-year-old medieval bog butter.
