= John O'Keefe =

John O'Keefe or O'Keeffe may refer to:

== Politics, government, and law ==
- John O'Keefe (Irish politician) (1827–1877), Member of Parliament for Dungarvan, 1874–1877
- John O'Keefe (Australian politician) (1880–1942), Queensland state MP
- John Martin O'Keefe (born 1946), U.S. diplomat
- John J. O'Keefe, III (1975–2022), American police officer found dead outside a home in Canton, Massachusetts

== Scientists ==
- John A. O'Keefe (astronomer) (1916–2000), American planetary scientist
- John O'Keefe (neuroscientist) (born 1939), American British neuroscientist, 2014 Nobel Prize laureate in Physiology or Medicine

== Sportspeople ==
- John O'Keeffe (Cork hurler) (1894–1973), Irish hurler in the 1910s and 1920s
- John O'Keeffe (Gaelic footballer) (born 1951), Irish footballer who played for Kerry
- John O'Keeffe (Tipperary hurler) (born 1988), Irish hurler in the 2000s
- John O'Keeffe (Australian rules footballer) (born 1943), Australian rules footballer with Fitzroy
- John R. O'Keefe (born 1936), Australian rules footballer with Carlton
- Jack O'Keefe (1915–2000), Australian rules footballer

== Other people ==
- John O'Keeffe (writer) (1747–1833), sometimes O'Keefe, Irish playwright
- John O'Keeffe (painter) (c. 1797–1838), Irish painter
- John O'Keefe (playwright) (born 1940), American playwright
- Johnny O'Keefe (1935–1978), Australian rock and roll singer
