= St. Finbarr's South Church =

Church in Cork, Ireland

St. Finbarr's South
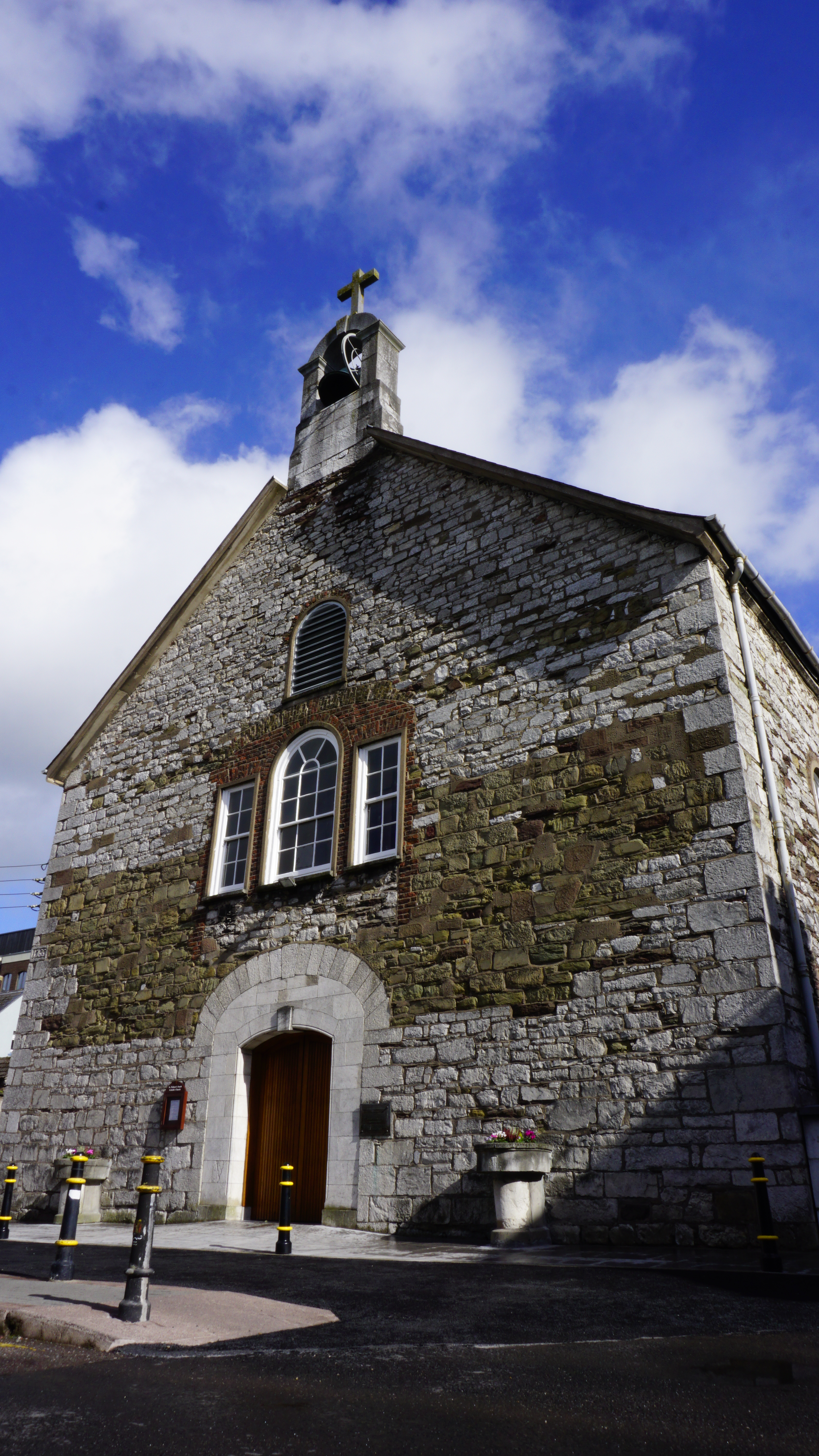
- Facade and entrance to St Finbarr's South Church
- St. Finbarr's South
- 51.8943°N 8.4716°W
- Location: Dunbar Street, Cork
- Country: Ireland
- Denomination: Catholic

History
- Dedication: Finbar of Cork

Architecture
- Years built: 1766 (main structure), 1809 (transept added)

Administration
- Diocese: Cork and Ross

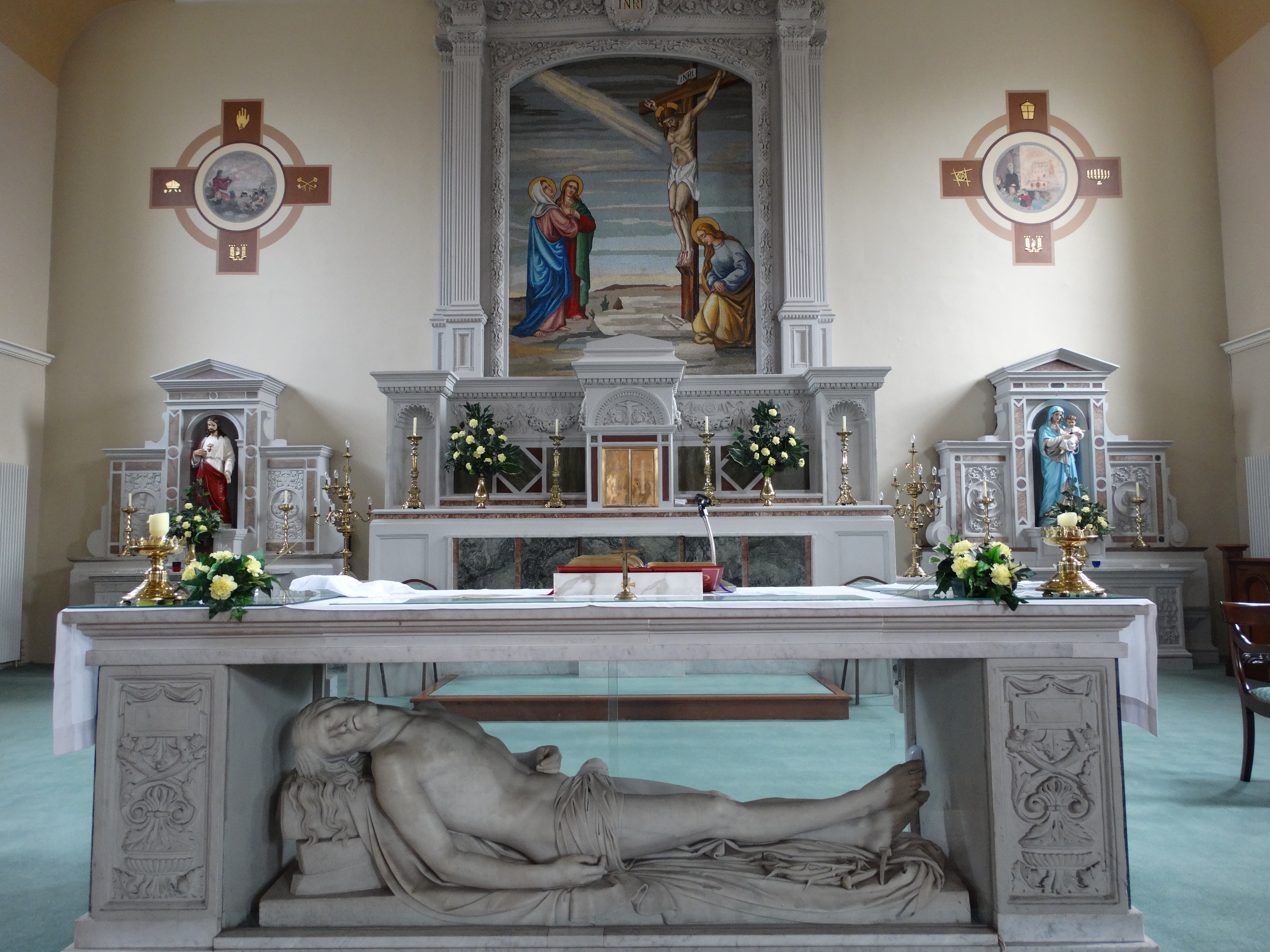
Church altar, with John Hogan's The Dead Christ and John O'Keeffe's Crucifixion

St. Finbarr's South, also known as the South Chapel, is an 18th century church in Cork in Ireland. Constructed in 1766 as the "first Catholic church built in Cork since before the Reformation", the Penal-era church was deliberately built to be relatively unimposing. It is the oldest Catholic church still in use in Cork city, and is the parish church of St Finbarr's South parish in the Roman Catholic Diocese of Cork and Ross. The church is included in the Record of Protected Structures maintained by Cork City Council.

Built of local limestone and red sandstone, the church was commissioned by the then parish priest, Daniel Albert O'Brien, to replace an existing thatched building. O'Brien, who had been appointed as parish priest and vicar general in 1760 by the then Bishop of Cork, Richard Walsh, was a member of the Dominican Order. O'Brien was succeeded as parish priest, in 1774, by Francis Moylan (later Bishop of Cork).

Originally built to an "L" shape, the church was extended and an additional transept was added in 1809. The main altar holds a statue, known as The Dead Christ, which was sculpted by John Hogan (1800–1858). A painting of the crucifixion, behind the altar, is attributed by some sources to the artist John O'Keeffe (c.1797–1838). The church was further extended in the 1860s, and additional work undertaken on the altar, in the 1870s, by ecclesiastical architect George Goldie (1828–1887).

Notable parishioners include John Stanislaus Joyce, who was baptised in the church in 1849. Other former parishioners include educator Nano Nagle, hospital founder Mary Aikenhead, military general Daniel O'Leary, sculptor John Hogan and Arctic explorer Jerome Collins.

== See also ==
- Saint Fin Barre's Cathedral
