= Finbar of Cork =

Bishop of Cork, Ireland, in the 7th century

Finbar
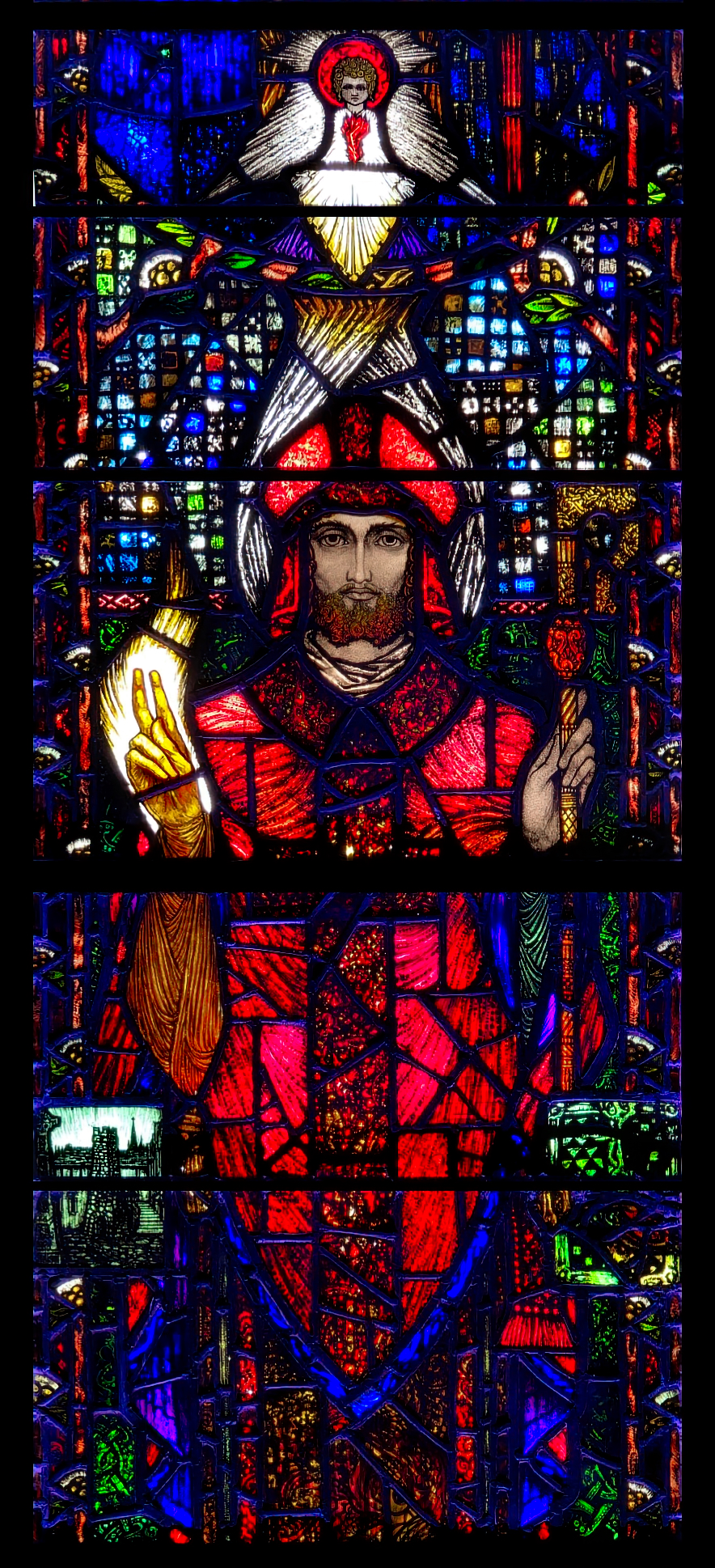
- St. Finbarr by Harry Clarke at the Honan Chapel

Bishop and Abbot
- Born: 550; Templemartin, north of Bandon,
- Died: 623; Cellnaclona (Cloyne) in Ballineadig
- Venerated in: Eastern Orthodox Church; Roman Catholic Church
- Major shrine: Gougane Barra, Saint Finbarre's Cathedral (Anglican cathedral, Cork)
- Feast: 25 September
- Patronage: Cork, Diocese of Cork

Saint Finbar, Finbarr, Finnbar, or Finnbarr, in Irish Fionnbharra, very often abbreviated to Barra (c. 550 – 25 September 623), was Bishop of Cork and abbot of a monastery in what is now the city of Cork, Ireland. He is patron saint of the city and of the Diocese of Cork. His feast day is 25 September.

== Life ==
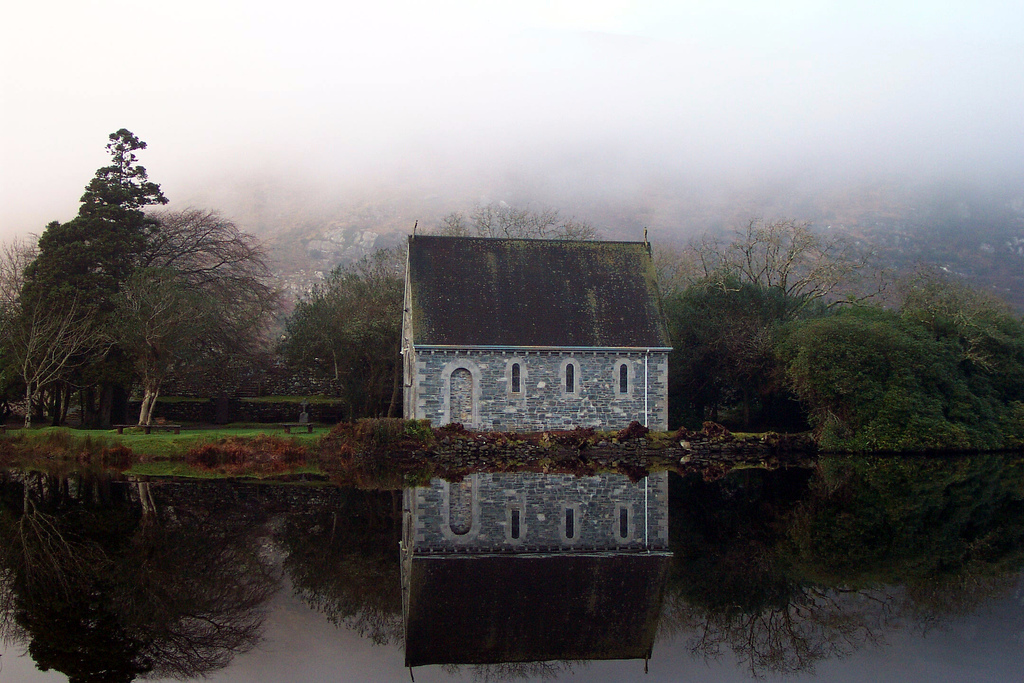
Gougane Barra

Having lived in Templemartin, which is near Bandon and originally named Lóchán (modern form, Loan), he was the son of Amergin of Maigh Seóla, a skilled craftsman originally from Galway. He studied in Ossory, corresponding approximately to the present County Kilkenny. He was renamed "Fionnbharra" (Fairhead in Irish), reportedly when, on being tonsured, the presiding cleric remarked: "Is fionn barr (find barr, in the Irish of the time) Lócháin", meaning, "Fair is the crest of Loan"), and he then became known as "Findbarr" ("Fionnbarra" in modern Irish). He went on pilgrimage to Rome with some of the monks, visiting St David in Wales on the way back.

On completion of his education he returned home and lived for some time on an island in the small lake, then called Loch Irce. The island is now called Gougane Barra (the little rock-fissure of Finnbarr). He is reputed to have built small churches in various other places, including one in Ballineadig, County Cork, called Cell na Cluaine, anglicised as Cellnaclona and sometimes referred to as Cloyne, causing it to be confused with Cloyne (Cluain Uamha) in east Cork.

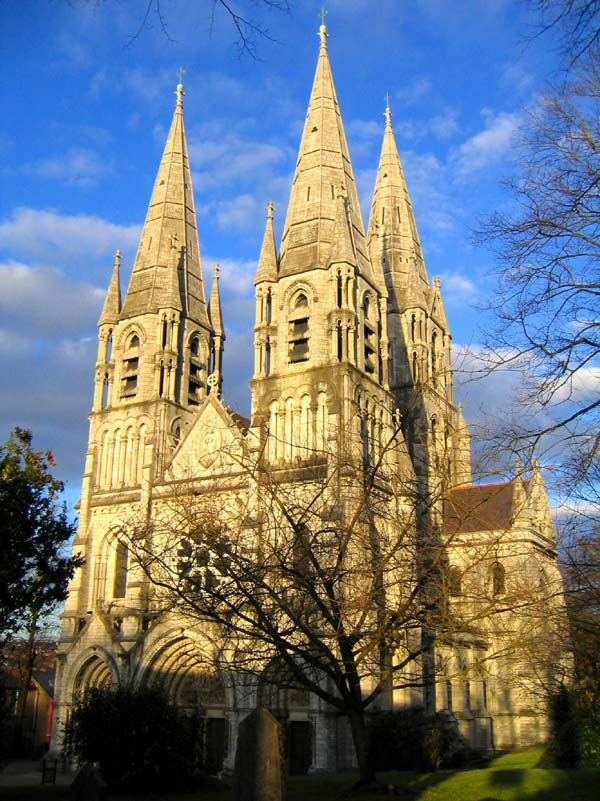
Saint Fin Barre's Cathedral

He settled for about the last seventeen years of his life in the area then known as Corcach Mór na Mumhan (the Great Marsh of Munster), now the city of Cork, where he gathered around him monks and students. This became an important centre of learning, giving rise to the phrase Ionad Bairre Sgoil na Mumhan. "Where Finbar taught let Munster learn", is the motto of today's University College Cork in English, though this is not a translation of the Irish motto "Ionad Bairre Sgoil na Mumhan" which means "Finbarr's foundation, the School of Munster".

The church and monastery he founded in 606 were on a limestone cliff above the River Lee, an area now known as Gill Abbey, after a 12th-century Bishop of Cork, Giolla Aedha Ó Muidhin. It continued to be the site of the cathedral of his diocese. The present building on the site, owned by the Church of Ireland, is called Saint Fin Barre's Cathedral. The people of Cork often refer to the nearby Catholic church, also dedicated to St Finbar, in Dunbar Street in the South Parish as 'the South Chapel', distinguishing it from the North Cathedral, the Catholic Cathedral of Saint Mary and Saint Anne, sometimes called 'the North Chapel'.

Finbar died at Cell na Cluaine, while returning from a visit to Gougane Barra. He was buried in the cemetery attached to his church in Cork.

== Legacy ==
There are at least six St. Finbar's schools in England, Chelsea, and Australia – at Ashgrove, Byron Bay, Invermay, Tasmania, Sans Souci (South Sydney, spelt St Finbar), East Brighton (Melbourne), Quilpie (South West Queensland), and Glenbrook, in the Blue Mountains. There is a St. Finbarr's school in Lagos, Nigeria. There is also a St. Finn Barr school and church in San Francisco, California. There is a parish & school named for the saint in Burbank, California. The original cathedral of the Diocese of Charleston, South Carolina, in the United States was named in honour of St. Finbar and remained standing until the Great Fire of Charleston during the Civil War. It is believed to have been named so because John England, the first bishop of Charleston, was originally from the County Cork and was consecrated a bishop in Saint Fin Barre's Church before travelling to the United States. In Coventry, England, St Finbarr's Social Club was named in honour of the saint during the late 1980's attracting large numbers from an Irish background to socialise. Upon demolition in 2006, a new housing scheme was completed in 2008 on the same site with the road name of Finbarr Close.

== Other Saint Finbars ==
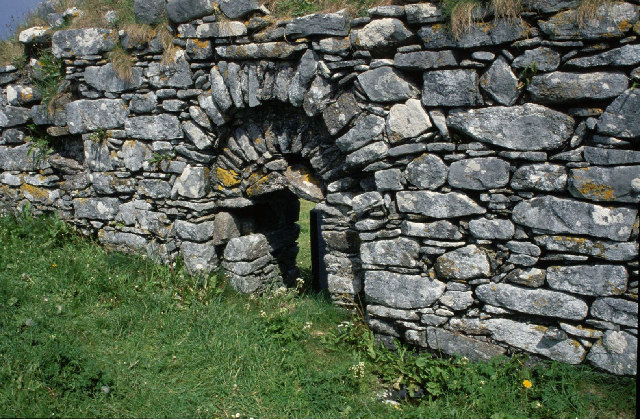
Portal of Cille Bharra on Barra Island

There are five Irish saints named Finnbarr. One scholar has theorized that the Cork saint is identical with Finnian of Moville, a teacher of Colm Cille.

Scotland has place names that refer to Saint Finnbarr, perhaps due to devotion to him having been carried there by disciples. One such place is the Gaelic-speaking island of Barra, where there is a ruined church called Cille Bharra (Church of Finnbarr). Tradition identifies that Finnbarr with the Cork saint, but it has been argued that he was Scottish.
