= Amergin =

Amergin, also spelled Amorgen, Amairgin, Aimhirghin, Amorghain, may refer to:

- Amergin Glúingel, poet and druid of the Irish Mythological Cycle
- Amergin mac Eccit, poet and hero of the Irish Ulster Cycle
- Amergin of Maigh Seóla (fl. 550), father of Finbarr of Cork, Ireland
- Amergin, a crater on Europa
- Amergin: An Enigma of the Forest, 1978 novel by Sven Berlin
