= The Dead Christ =

Series of sculptures by John Hogan

The Dead Christ or The Redeemer in Death is a statue of Jesus Christ executed in white Carrara marble by the Irish sculptor John Hogan (1800–1858). The work was first sculpted by Hogan when he was based in Rome, alongside other artists such as sculptor Bertel Thorvaldsen (1770–1844). Thorvaldsen reputedly described the statue as Hogan's "masterpiece". In all, Hogan carved three versions of the statue in marble:

- the first (1829) is located in St. Teresa's Carmelite Church, Dublin, Ireland
- the second (1833) in St. Finbarr's (South) Church, Cork, Ireland
- the third and final (1854) is located in the Basilica of St. John the Baptist, St. John's, Newfoundland

A fourth statue, a plaster cast, is on display in the Crawford Art Gallery in Cork, Ireland. It was acquired from Hogan's widow, Cornelia Bevigani, by William Horatio Crawford.

== Gallery ==
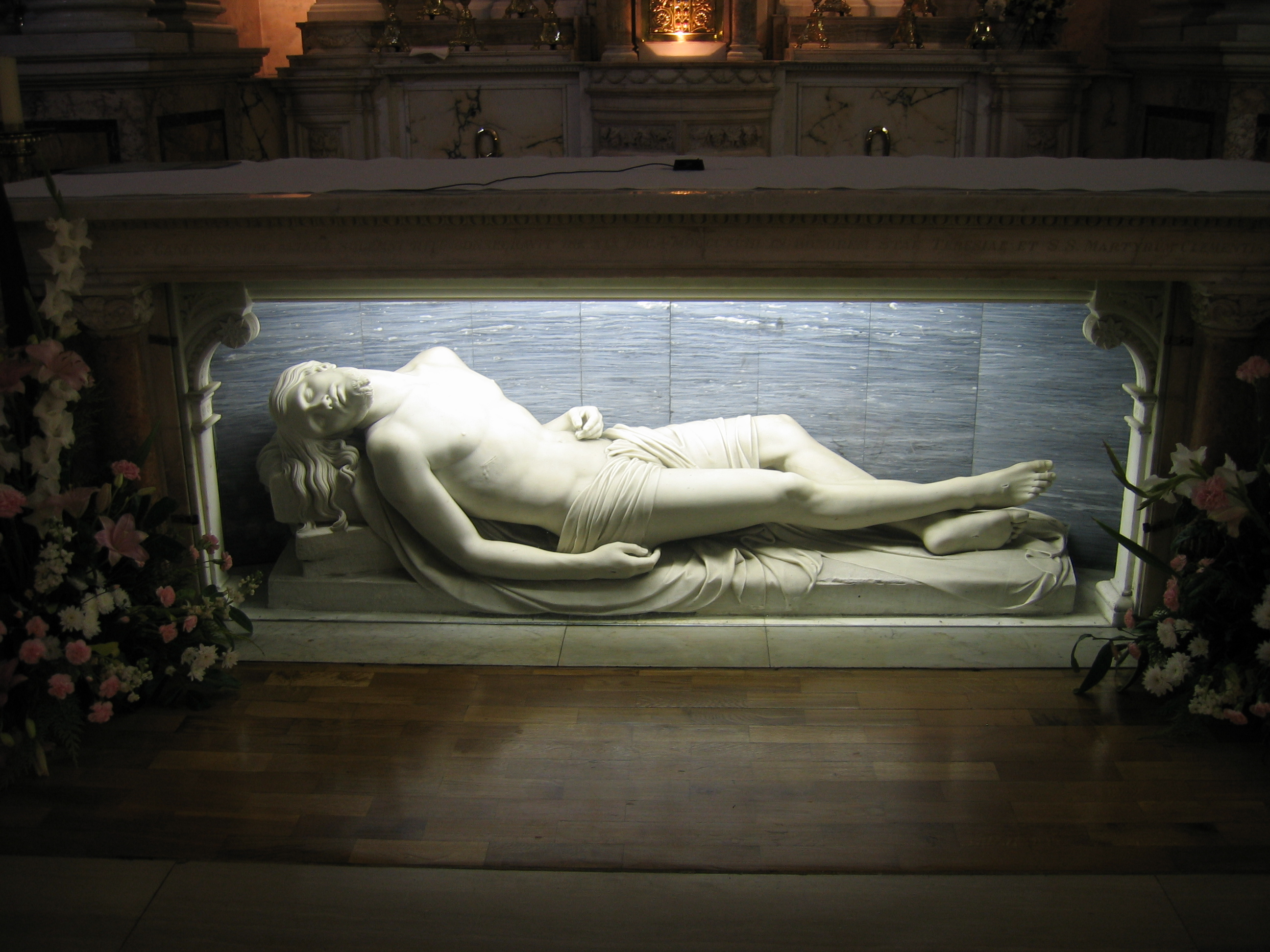
The Dead Christ (1829, Carrara marble), at St. Teresa's Carmelite Church in Dublin, Ireland

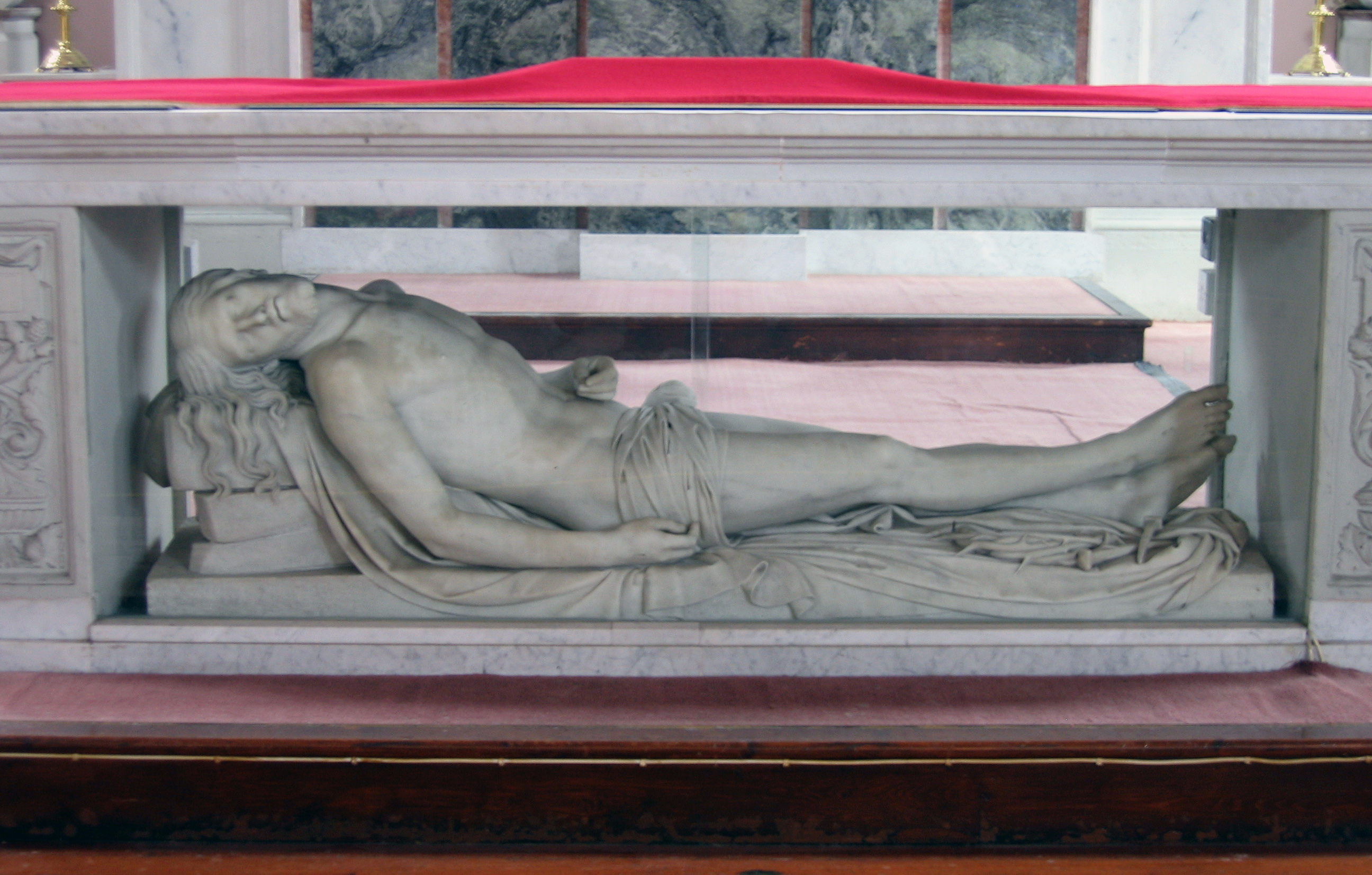
The Dead Christ (1833, Carrara marble), at St. Finbarr's South Church in Cork, Ireland

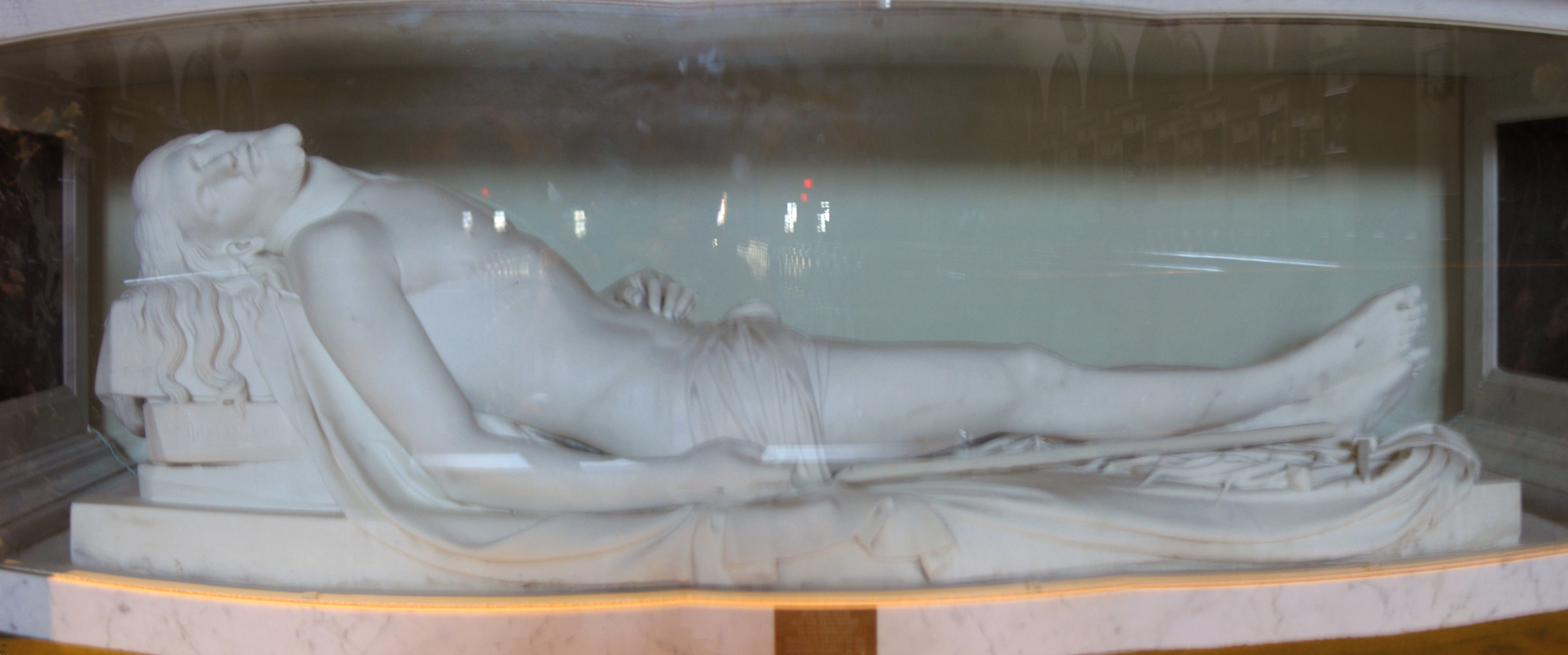
The Dead Christ (1854, Carrara marble), at the Basilica of St. John the Baptist in St. John's, Newfoundland

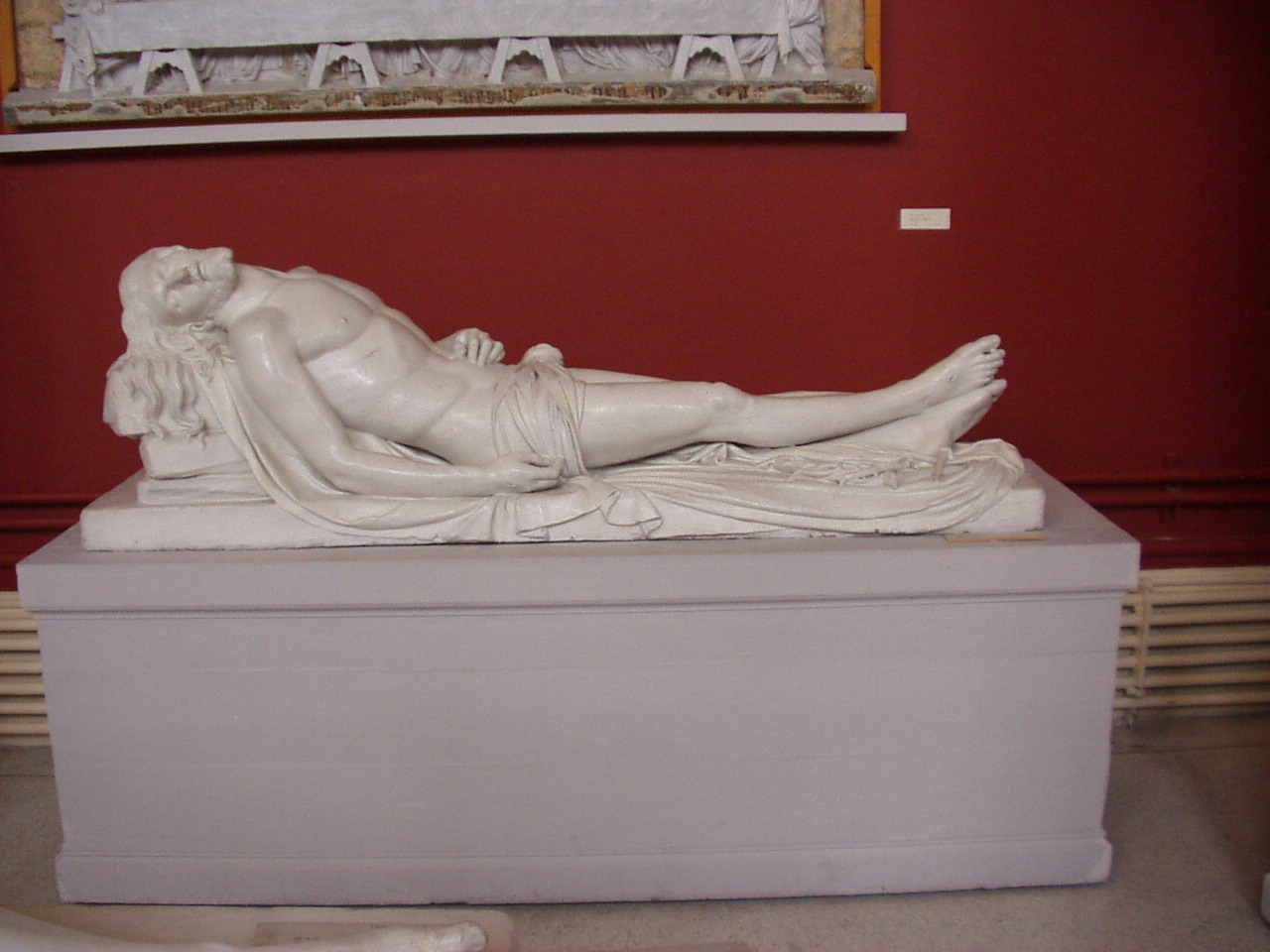
The Dead Christ (plaster), at the Crawford Art Gallery in Cork, Ireland

== See also ==
- List of statues of Jesus
- Veiled Christ
