= John Hogan (sculptor) =

Irish sculptor

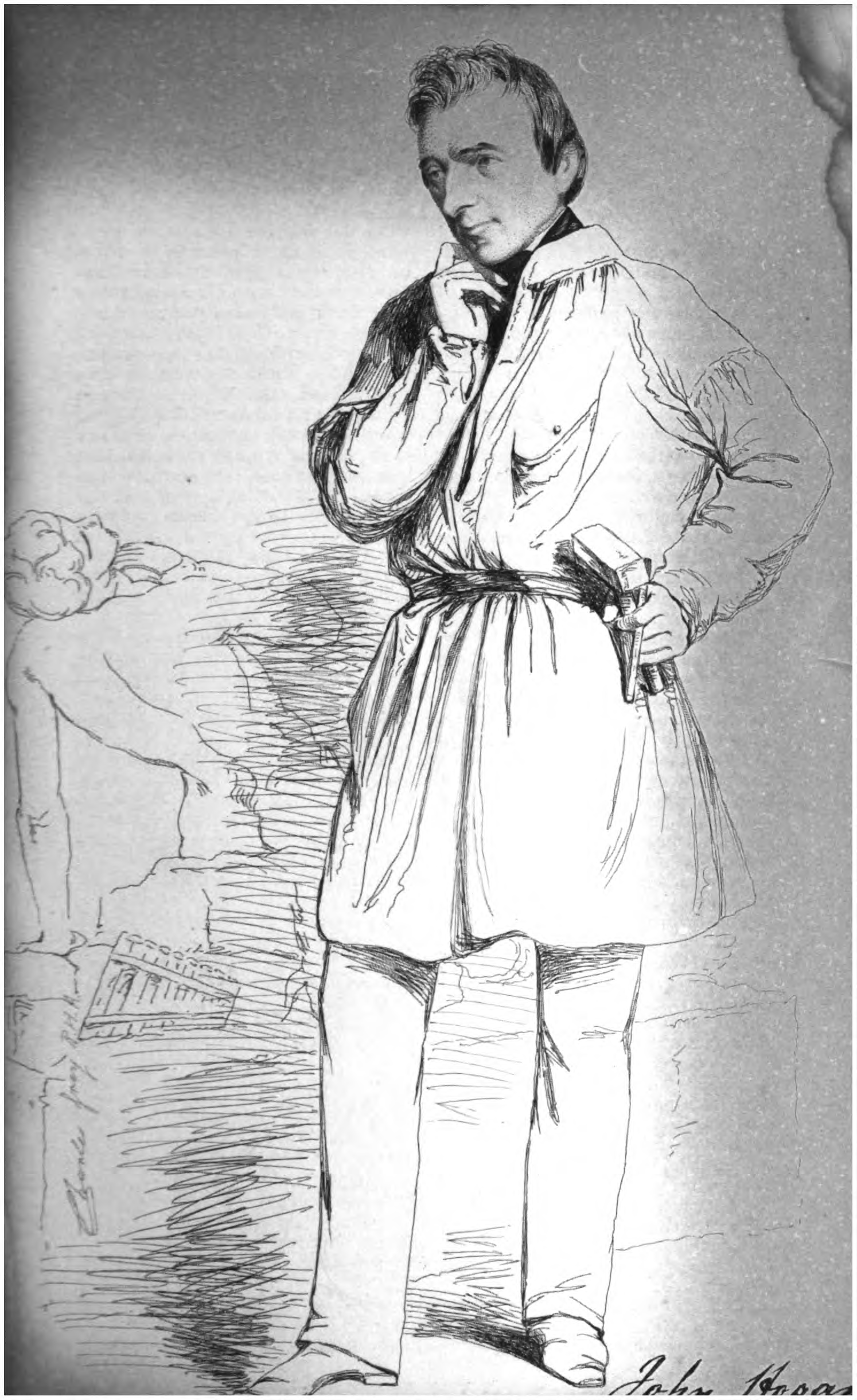
- John Hogan, Dublin University Magazine January 1850
- Born: 14 October 1800; Tallow, County Waterford, Ireland
- Died: 27 March 1858 (aged 57); Dublin, Ireland
- Resting place: Glasnevin Cemetery
- Known for: Ecclesiastical and monumental sculpture
- Notable work: The Dead Christ, Hibernia with the bust of Lord Cloncurry

John Hogan (14 October 1800 – 27 March 1858) was a sculptor from Tallow, County Waterford in Ireland. Described in some sources as the "greatest of Irish sculptors", according to the Dictionary of Irish Biography he was responsible for "much of the most significant religious sculpture in Ireland" during the 19th century. Working primarily from Rome, among his best known works are three versions of The Dead Christ, commissioned for churches in Dublin, Cork, and the Basilica of St. John the Baptist in Newfoundland, Canada.

== Early life and apprenticeship ==
John Hogan was born on 14 October 1800 in Tallow, County Waterford, the third child of John Hogan, a carpenter and builder of Cove Street, Cork and Frances Cos, the great-granddaughter of Sir Richard Cox, Lord Chancellor of Ireland from 1703 to 1707. As the family felt that she had married beneath her station, she was disinherited.

At the age of fourteen, Hogan was placed as clerk to an attorney, where he spent much of his time carving figures in wood. After two years, he chose to be apprenticed to the architect Sir Thomas Deane, where his talents for drawing and carving were developed. He carved balusters, capitals, and ornamental figures for Deane's buildings. At the completion of his apprenticeship in March 1820, Deane encouraged him to consider taking up sculpture as a profession. For the next three years, Hogan attended lectures on anatomy, copied casts of classic statuary in the Gallery of the Cork Society of Arts, and made anatomical studies in wood of feet, hands, and legs. Among the first of his works to attract notice was a life-size figure of Minerva for an insurance building built by Deane.

== Move to Rome ==
In 1821, Hogan carved twenty-seven statues in wood for the North Chapel in Cork for the reredos behind the high altar. After subsequent cathedral renovations, these are now positioned in decorative plasterwork over the nave. He also did a bas-relief of the "Last Supper" for the altar. This work kept him employed for about a year.

In 1823, the engraver William Paulet Carey visited Cork, and impressed with Hogan's talent began to publicise his work in order to raise subscriptions for him to study in Italy. Hogan arrived in Rome, by way of Dublin and Liverpool, in 1824. He worked in the galleries of the Vatican, but could not afford a studio. Additional subscriptions allowed him to improve his situation, rent a studio, purchase marble, and hire models. Danish sculptor Bertel Thorwaldsen said to him, "My son, you are the best sculptor I leave after me in Rome".

In 1829, Hogan visited Ireland, bringing several works with him. The Royal Arts Society provided a venue for an exhibition. The Dublin Society awarded him a gold medal.

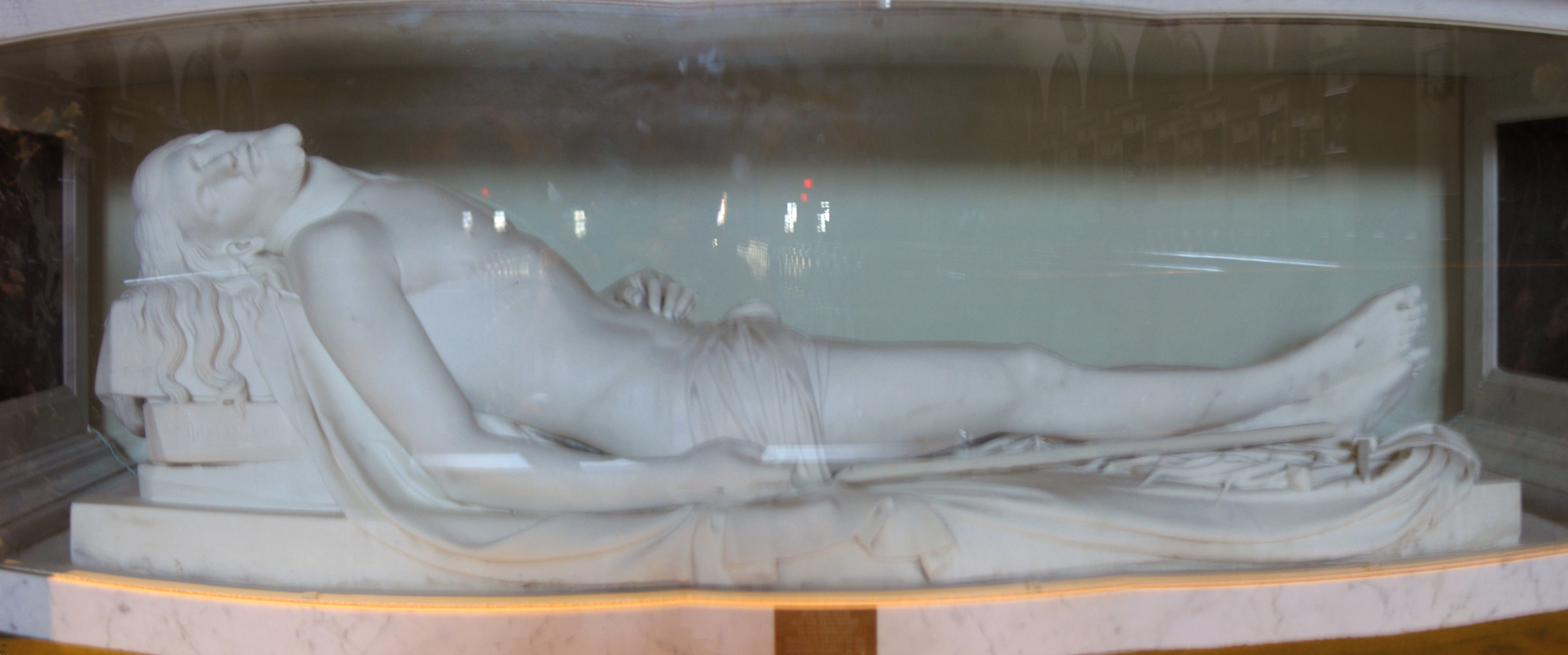
"Dead Christ", Basilica of St. John the Baptist

Hogan's best known work and masterpiece are the three versions of the statue of The Dead Christ or The Redeemer in Death. Created in flawless Carrara marble, the first version (1829) is located in St. Therese's Church, Dublin, Ireland, the second (1833) in St. Finbarr's (South) Church, Cork, Ireland and the third and final version (1854) is located in the Basilica of St. John the Baptist, Newfoundland. Other works by Hogan include the Sleeping Shepherd and The Drunken Faun. Hogan assured his international reputation in 1829 with The Dead Christ; thereafter, his creations were snapped up by Irish bishops visiting his Rome studio.

In 1837 he was elected a member of the Virtuosi del Pantheon. During the next several years, he had several works in hand, including a marble statue of Daniel O Connell, for the Repeal Association. The statue stands today at City Hall Dublin, the same spot where O'Connell gave his first speech against the Act of Union in 1800.

In 1840, a monumental group in memory of Bishop Doyle, founder of Carlow Cathedral was brought to Dublin and exhibited at the Royal Exchange. the statue of Bishop Doyle is in the Cathedral of the Assumption, Carlow, as is a second Hogan work depicting the Holy Family.

== Later life and death ==
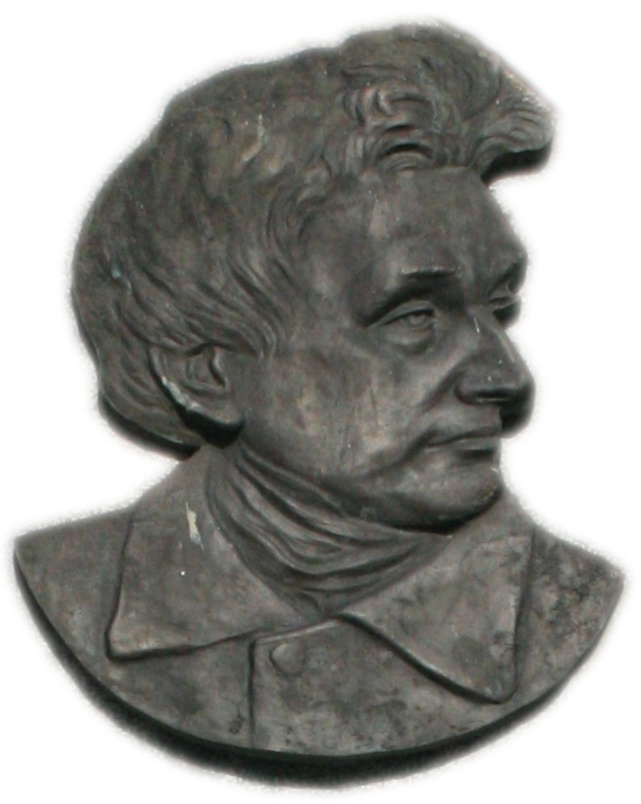
Plaque in Tallow at the parish hall to commemorate John Hogan

Hogan married Cornelia Bevignani in Rome in 1838. The figure of Hibernia, in Hogan's work Hibernia with the Bust of Lord Cloncurry (1844), was reportedly modelled on his wife. (A representation of this work was later used as the watermark on all Series A banknotes printed in Ireland from the 1920s to the 1970s.) The couple had four sons and eight daughters.

With the revolutionary movement growing in Italy during the 1840s, and after spending twenty-four years in Rome, Hogan returned with his family to Ireland in 1848. At first, he found little work in the aftermath of the Great Famine, but gradually commissions increased. Hogan could be impatient with ignorance, intolerant of professional inferiority, and independent. He held aloof from other artists and refused to join the Hibernian Academy.

Hogan had a stroke in 1855 and, though he recovered somewhat, his health began to fail. By the year prior to his death, he could no longer work and his sons, John Valentine Hogan and James Cahill, assisted at his studio and completed some of the work.

John Hogan died at his home at 14 Wentworth Place, Dublin (later renamed Hogan Place) on 27 March 1858. He was buried at Glasnevin Cemetery.
