= South Parish, Cork =

Coordinates: 51.89401°N 8.47234°W

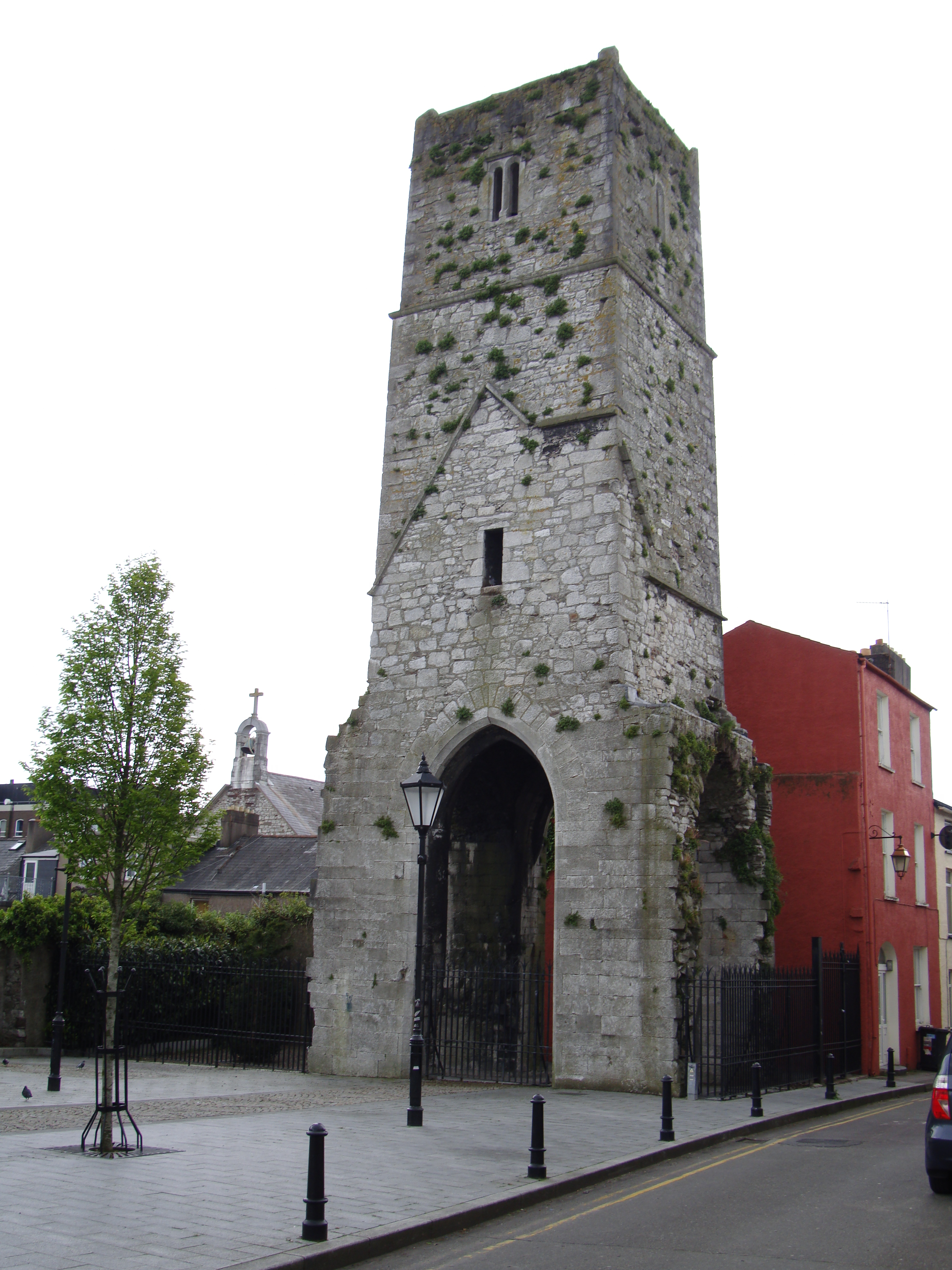
Red Abbey tower

South Parish is the name given to both a Roman Catholic parish of Cork City and to the residential area contained within it.

== Location ==
The parish stretches from Oliver Plunkett Street in the north to St Patrick's Road in the south and from Sharman Crawford Street in the west to Albert Road in the east.

When used to refer to the residential area, the parts north of the south channel of the River Lee are usually excluded as being part of the city centre. For example, the scope of Cork City Council's 'South Parish Area Action Plan' excludes the parish's city centre areas.

== History ==
Elizabeth Fort in the 19th century

The South Parish is one of the oldest inhabited areas of Cork City. Along with Shandon, it was the first area developed outside the city walls. In the oldest known maps of Cork City, including examples dated to 1545 and 1601, there are structures shown in the area.

There was a Danish settlement in the area that is now Frenches Quay, Barrack Street and George's Quay as early as the 10th century AD. In this area, Keysers Hill still bears a name of Danish origin.

The Red Abbey, Cork's oldest surviving medieval structure, was built in the late 13th or early 14th century. Also in the area is Elizabeth Fort, the current structure of which was built in 1624, to replace an earlier fort dating from 1601.

By 1690, there had been additional development in the area, with the streets that are now Barrack St, Evergreen St, Douglas St, Cove St and Sober Lane distinguishable in maps and lined with buildings. It was in this year that the Siege of Cork took place. Cork was occupied by Jacobite forces who held Elizabeth Fort. They were attacked by Williamite forces from the Red Abbey and Saint Fin Barre's Cathedral. Both located in South Parish, these were the only high vantage points in the area. This siege led to significant damage to buildings in the area, such as the Red Abbey, which was never used for religious purposes again and St Nicholas Church, which was not rebuilt until 1720.

By 1726 all but a small area of the South Parish, designated as 'Gardens', had been built up and by 1750, the development of the area was complete, with any new buildings replacing existing buildings.

The present South Chapel (St. Finbarr's South), the Roman Catholic parish church, was built in 1766. The Church of Ireland church, St Nicholas, was rebuilt again in 1850, although this is now deconsecrated with parish duties merged with the parish of St Fin Barre's cathedral
