= Paddy O'Keeffe =

Irish hurler

Personal information
- Native name: Pádraig Ó Cuív (Irish)
- Died: Unknown
- Occupation: Labourer

Sport
- Sport: Hurling
- Position: Half-back
Club
- Years: Club
- Carrigtwohill
Club titles
- Cork titles: 0
Inter-county
Years	County	Apps (scores)
1893	Cork	2
Inter-county titles
- Munster titles: 1
- All-Irelands: 1

Paddy O'Keeffe was an Irish hurler who played as a half-back for the Cork senior team.

O'Keeffe played for Cork for just one season in the 1893 championship. It was a successful year as he won a set of All-Ireland and Munster medals.

At club level O'Keeffe enjoyed a lengthy career with Carrigtwohill.

O'Keeffe's son, John, also played with Cork and won an All-Ireland medal in 1919. They were the first father and son combination to achieve the distinction of capturing All-Ireland winners' medals.
