= John O'Keeffe (painter) =

Irish artist (ca. 1797 - 1838)

- Born: 1797; Fermoy, County Cork, Ireland
- Died: April 1838 (aged 40–41); Limerick
- Known for: Painting

John O'Keeffe sometimes O'Keefe (c. 1797 – April 1838) was an Irish portrait and figure painter.

== Life ==
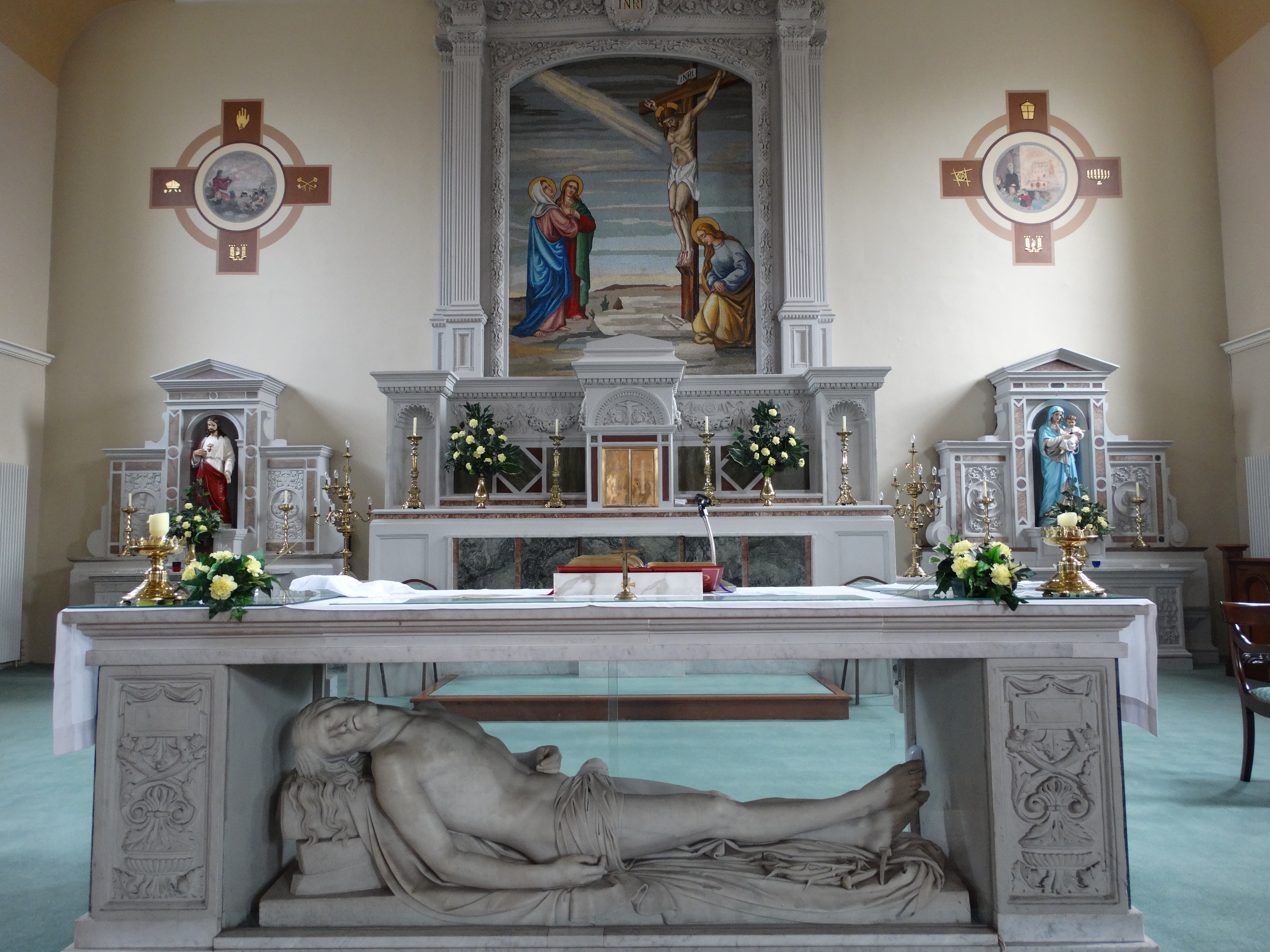
St. Finbarr's South Church, Cork with O'Keeffe's painting behind the altar

Born in Fermoy, County Cork of humble parentage, O'Keeffe began painting at an early age and was apprenticed to a coach painter. After his apprenticeship, he worked as a journeyman, specialising in painting heralds. He is said to have read widely to compensate for the lack of an early education.

He began painting scenes for local theatres, working his way up to religious pictures for local Roman Catholic churches. A painting of the crucifixion at St. Finbarr's South Church, Cork, it attributed to him. In 1831 he sent a Portrait of a Lady and Crucifixion to the Royal Hibernian Academy. By this time he was married.

He left Cork in 1834 for Dublin and continued to exhibit portrait and subject paintings. A painting from this period, A Sibyl (1835) was, as of 1913, held in the Cork Public Museum. Strickland also records in 1913 that the Royal Hospital Kilmainham held a portrait by O'Keeffe of a pensioner, John Henderson, who had fought at the Battle of Culloden and other military engagements. He exhibited a painting of the British army Field Marshal Edward Blakeney at the RHA in 1837.

Just as his career was on the rise he died while on a visit to Limerick in April 1838. He left a widow and children, with a raffle being held of his painting Sibyl for their benefit.

Notes on his life and work were recorded in Windele's Cork by John Windele in the mid-19th century. The Crawford Gallery holds a portrait of Nano Nagle attributed to O'Keeffe.
