= John O'Keeffe (Australian rules footballer) =

Australian rules footballer

John O'Keefe

Personal information
- Full name: John O'Keefe
- Born: 24 November 1943
- Height: 178 cm (5 ft 10 in)
- Weight: 73 kg (161 lb)

Playing career^{1}
Years	Club	Games (Goals)
1965	Fitzroy	1 (0)
- ^{1} Playing statistics correct to the end of 1965.

John O'Keefe (born 24 November 1943) is a former Australian rules footballer who played with Fitzroy in the Victorian Football League (VFL).
