= John R. O'Keefe =

Australian rules footballer

John O'Keefe

Personal information
- Full name: John A O'Keefe
- Born: 17 November 1936 (age 89)
- Original team: Mildura Imperials
- Height: 181 cm (5 ft 11 in)
- Weight: 73 kg (161 lb)

Playing career^{1}
Years	Club	Games (Goals)
1959–60	Carlton	10 (3)
- ^{1} Playing statistics correct to the end of 1960.

John O'Keefe (born 17 November 1936) is a former Australian rules footballer who played with Carlton in the Victorian Football League (VFL).
