= Amergin of Maigh Seóla =

Amergin of Maigh Seóla, father of Finbarr of Cork, fl. c. 550.

Amergin is described as an artisan from Connacht, and a member of the Uí Briúin. He is said to have belonged to a branch that ruled Maigh Seóla, although they would not be considered among the Uí Briúin till the 10th century.

He settled in Muskerry, County Cork. He obtained work as chief smith to King Tighernach of Ui Eachach, and in time he gained land at Achaidh Durbchon (near Gougane Barra, source of the river Lee).

Against Tighernach's wishes, Amergin married a member of the royal household. They were caught and sentenced to be burned alive for defying Tighernach but in what was regarded as a sign of divine intervention, a storm of heavy rain put out the fire. Thus they were set free.

A child was born from this union and they returned to Gougane Barra, where the boy was baptised Luan, or Lochan. When he was seven years old three clerics of Munster, returning from a pilgrimage to Leinster, happened to stop at the house of Amergin. They admired the boy for the grace of the Holy Spirit that seemed to them to shine in his face, and were allowed by his parents to take him away to be educated. He studied at a place called Sliabh Muinchill, where, as was usual at the time, he was tonsured and had his name changed. The cleric who cut his hair is said to have observed, "Fair (finn) is the hair (barra) of Luan." "Let this be his name," said another, "Barr Finn, or Finn Barr."
