= Richard Walsh (bishop) =

Roman-catholic bishop

Richard Walsh DD (b Gortroe 1697; d Cork 1763) was an Irish Roman Catholic Bishop in the eighteenth century.

Walsh was a compromise candidate for the Bishopric of Cork. The two leading candidates were John O’Brien, Parish Priest of Castlelyons, and James Butler, nephew of the Archbishop of Cashel. He was consecrated on 10 January 1748 and served until his death.
