= John O'Keeffe (Cork hurler) =

Irish hurler

Personal information
- Native name: Seán Ó Caoimh (Irish)
- Born: 20 June 1895 Carrigtwohill, County Cork, Ireland
- Died: 25 October 1973 (aged 78) Carrigtwohill, County Cork, Ireland
- Occupation: Labourer
- Height: 5 ft 8 in (173 cm)

Sport
- Sport: Hurling
- Position: Midfield
Club
- Years: Club
- Carrigtwohill
Club titles
- Cork titles: 1
Inter-county
Years	County	Apps (scores)
1919-1924	Cork	11 (0-00)
Inter-county titles
- Munster titles: 2
- All-Irelands: 1

John O'Keeffe (20 June 1895 – 25 October 1973) was an Irish hurler who played as a midfielder for the Cork senior team.

O'Keeffe made his first appearance for the team during the 1919 championship and was a regular member of the starting fifteen until his retirement after the 1924 championship. During that time he won one All-Ireland medal and two Munster medals.

At club level O'Keeffe was a one-time county championship medalist with Carrigtwohill.

O'Keeffe's father, Paddy, also played with Cork and won an All-Ireland medal in 1893. They were the first father and son combination to achieve the distinction of capturing All-Ireland winners' medals.
