= St. Vincent's Church, Cork =

Former Catholic church in Cork, Ireland

St. Vincent's Church
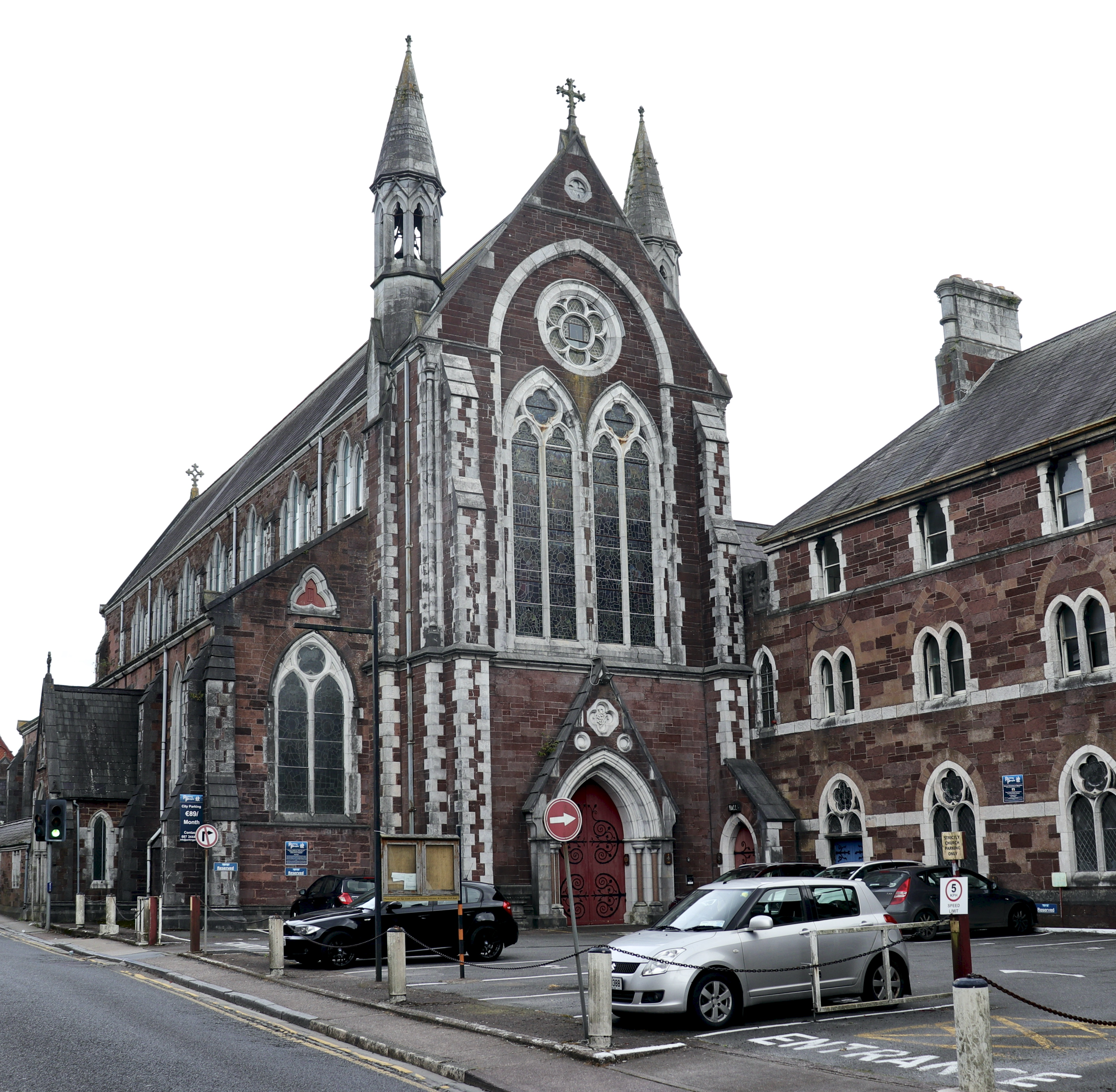
- Church facade and entrance in Sunday's Well
- St. Vincent's Church
- 51.89957°N 8.49015°W
- Country: Ireland
- Denomination: Catholic Church

History
- Status: Church (deconsecrated)
- Dedicated: 20 July 1856

Architecture
- Architect(s): John Benson, George Goldie, Samuel Francis Hynes
- Style: gothic
- Years built: 1850-1860

St. Vincent's Church is a former church in Sunday's Well in Cork, Ireland. Situated on a hill on the north side of the River Lee, it first opened in the 1850s and was associated with the Vincentian Fathers. As of the 21st century, it no longer operates as a place of worship and is owned by University College Cork.

== History ==
The idea for the church was brought forward by a local priest, Fr Michael O'Sullivan, a native of Bantry and the chaplain to the Cork City Gaol, who died in 1855, before the church's completion. The site for the church was donated in 1851 by a local resident Mary MacSwiney, a relative of the future Lord Mayor of Cork Terence MacSwiney, and the church was designed by a self-taught architect and engineer John Benson for the Vincentian order.

While the foundation stone was laid by bishop William Delany on 24 October 1851, construction was delayed by severe damage caused by a storm on 14 November 1853, which destroyed the roof and its supporting walls. Due to this damage, some design features, including a planned spire on the west side as sketched by another architect Henry Hill, were foregone. The church was dedicated on 20 July 1856, while additional works were later completed by George Goldie and Samuel Francis Hynes. In particular, Goldie is credited with the interior design and the addition, in 1873, of the adjoining presbytery. Hynes is credited with the façade and pinnacles on the west side - the latter being built in lieu of the planned tower.

The church and the adjacent House of Retreat are built in gothic style in red sandstone reputed to have come from the Cork railway tunnel and quoined in limestone. The nave is separated from the aisles by green Irish marble columns. The stained glass windows were designed by Franz Mayer of Munich company, possibly specifically by a French artist Marie Alexander Ledien. As of the early 2000s, it was the only remaining Cork church to have all windows made up entirely of stained glass. The altar faces the east side in line with the ad orientem principle, while a timber gallery on the west side houses piped organ.

In May 1997, the 150th anniversary of the Vincentian order's presence in Cork was celebrated in the church with cèilidh, a fair, brass band music, and masses attended by the Lord Mayor of Cork Jim Corr and Bishop of Cork and Ross John Buckley.

In 2003, the church interior was refurbished with the effort of Fr Brian McGee and the people of St Vincent's community, and the stations of the cross were filmed inside the church. A historic famine cross, lost from its original location in a Clonakilty county house during a renovation, was found to be displayed as a part of the stations of the cross in St Vincent's and was restored to Clonakilty in 2014.

== Later use and acquisition ==
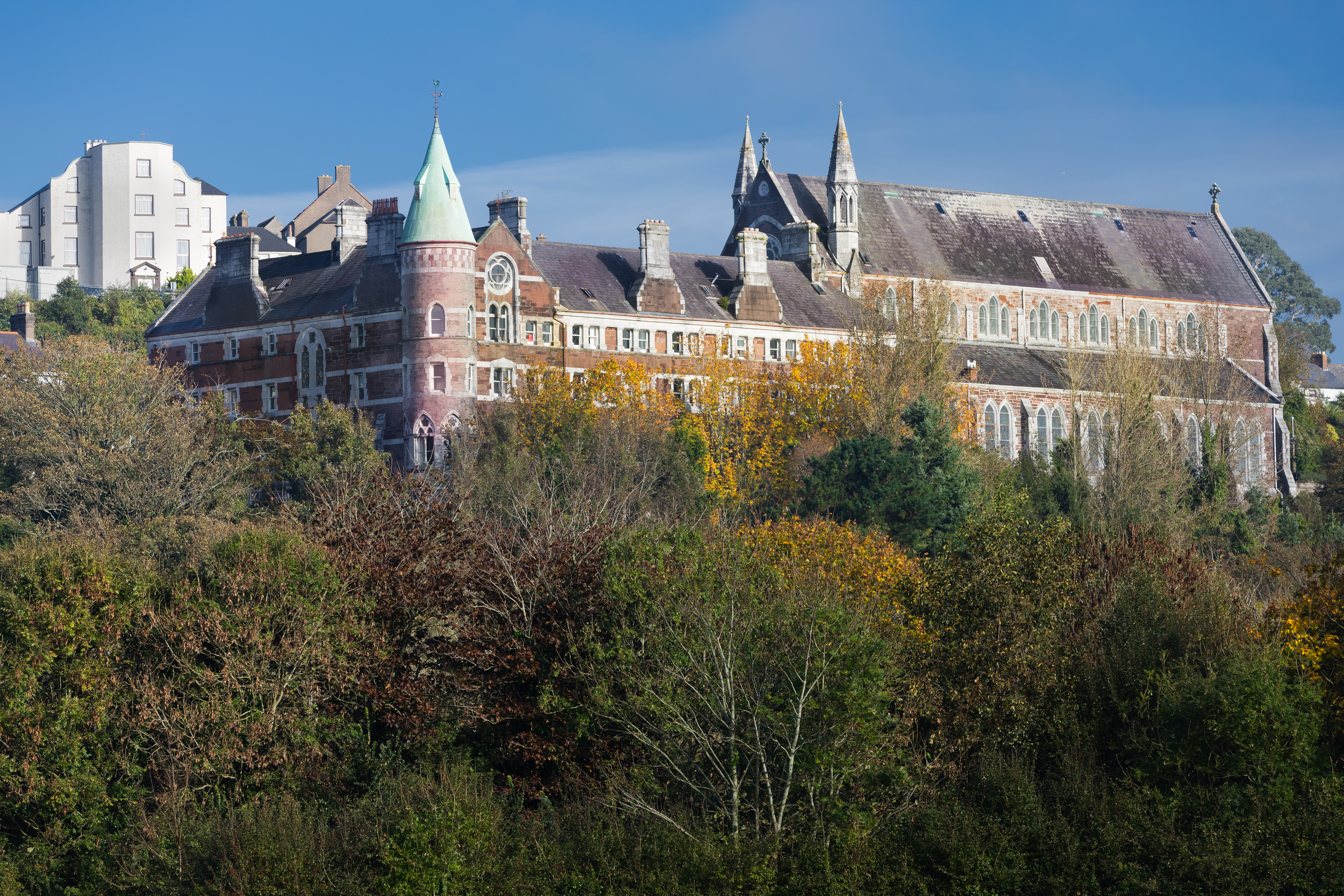
View, from the Mardyke area of Cork, of the church and former seminary accommodation block

Between 1998 and 1999, the 17,000 square feet (1,600 m^{2}) presbytery and seminary accommodation blocks on the site, which had already been partially rented out to the CIT Cork School of Music, was sold to University College Cork (UCC) for IR£1 million.

In June 2015, the Sunday's Well parish was integrated into that of the Cathedral of St Mary and St Anne. In 2016, a petition signed by 120 people was sent to the Vincentians, the Nuncio as well as bishop Buckley, to keep the church open. The petition was unsuccessful. The rest of the building complex, including the church itself, were acquired by UCC in 2019.
