= Michael Murphy (bishop) =

Irish Catholic bishop

- Bishop of Cork and Ross
- Church: Catholic Church
- Diocese: Diocese of Cork and Ross
- In office: 23 August 1980 – 7 October 1996
- Predecessor: Cornelius Lucey
- Successor: John Buckley
- Previous posts: Titular Bishop of Sila (1976-1980); Coadjutor Bishop of Cork and Ross (1976-1980)

Orders
- Ordination: 19 June 1949
- Consecration: 23 May 1976 by Cornelius Lucey

Personal details
- Born: 18 February 1924 Kilmichael, County Cork, Irish Free State, British Empire
- Died: 7 October 1996 (aged 72) Cork, County Cork, Republic of Ireland

Michael Murphy (b. Kilmichael, County Cork 18 February 1924; d. Cork 7 October 1996) was an Irish Catholic bishop in the last quarter of the 20th Century.

Before becoming a priest Murphy was a member of the team that won the 1941 All-Ireland Minor Hurling Championship. Murphy was ordained priest on 19 June 1949. He served in Peru then as head teacher of St Finbarr's College, Farranferris. He was appointed Coadjutor Bishop of Cork and Ross on 1 April 1976 and was consecrated its diocesan on 23 August 1980. He died in post sixteen years later.

Catholic Church titles
Preceded by Cornelius Lucey	Bishop of Cork and Ross; 1980–1996	Succeeded by John Buckley
