= St Finbarr's College, Farranferris =

Defunct secondary school in Ireland

Information
- Established: 1887
- Closed: 2006

Farranferris, also known as St Finbarr's College, was a secondary school in Cork City, Ireland. It opened in 1887, closed in 2006, and was an important institution in the twentieth century history of the city.

== History ==
=== Saint Finbarr’s Seminary ===
At the time of the Penal Laws Irishmen who wanted to study to become priests had to travel overseas and many of them went to France (Cork, for example, had close links with Irish colleges in Bordeaux and Toulouse). French colleges were closed down during the French Revolution and this caused a drop in the supply of priests to Irish parishes. In 1795 St Patrick's College, Maynooth was opened to provide for the education of Catholic priests in Ireland (supported by the British Government to prevent priests being influenced by revolutionary ideas from abroad) and that same year the Bishop of Cork set up a post-primary preparatory seminary in Ballyvolane House (near present-day Ellis's Yard), it was to prepare boys for Maynooth and other seminary colleges.

The residential seminary in Ballyvolane House closed after a short time and in 1813 the Bishop of Cork established Saint Mary's Seminary across the road from the North Cathedral. A recession associated with the Napoleonic Wars closed Saint Mary's after eight years. Cork's next preparatory seminary would be set up by the Vincentians in 1845, it would occupy a building that had previously been the Lord Mayor's Mansion House (now Mercy Hospital) for twelve years before moving to a vacant school building located at Saint Patrick's Place (in the red-brick building where Cork's 96FM is based now). The Patrick's Place building did not have facilities for boarders.

In September 1876, the Bishop of Cork took control of the Saint Patrick's Place seminary and renamed it Saint Finbarr's Seminary. The first president of Saint Finbarr's was Fr. J.J. Coughlan. In April 1881 the church acquired Carrollina House in Montenotte so Saint Finbarr's could function as a residential seminary for pupils who wished to become priests (Carrollina, which was situated where the Ardnalee housing estate now stands, was named by John Carroll in 1770s, he was a great grand-nephew of Charles Carroll). At the beginning there were fourteen students in residence in Carrollina.

=== Farranferris ===
The idea for a new purpose built residential seminary school was raised immediately on the founding of Saint Finbarr's. In 1881 a bequest of £1200 from a Miss O’Driscoll set things in motion and from 1883 to 1885 a new college was built at Farranferris on the northside of the city (Farranferris – land of Ferris, supposedly Ferris was an old English landlord in the area). It was constructed by E. P. O'Flynn at a cost of £17,000 to designs by Samuel Francis Hynes (it is listed in the National Inventory of Architectural Heritage as a "fine and imposing example of late Victorian ecclesiastical architecture in the Gothic Revival style"). Two workers were killed in an accident during its construction.

The new college opened in September 1887; the pupils who had lived in Carrollina moved to the new dorms and the old classrooms at Saint Patrick's Place were handed over to the Christian Brothers (who founded a new school in its place).

At the time Farranferris was being built the Bishop of Cork, William Delany, was infirm with old age and most of his duties, including the driving forward of the college, were being carried out by Henry Neville. Before the college opened, Delany died (to be replaced by Thomas A. O'Callaghan), and Neville was moved on. Dr. John B. O’Mahony was President of Farranferris for its first twenty years.

=== Becoming a day school ===
Dr. Patrick Sexton became the president of Farranferris in 1907; at the time the college had about 20 students, all of whom were intending to become priests in time (there was no entrance exam, a candidate only needed a testimonial from his parish priest to be admitted). A short time after he took over Sexton decided that Farranferris should accept day pupils for outside students. The first of these boys began classes in September 1909.

In 1916, the Bishop of Cork, Thomas A. O'Callaghan, died and was replaced by Daniel Cohalan; Cohalan was the first bishop of Cork who had previously passed through Farranferris as a student.

At the time Cohalan was appointed bishop, World War I was well underway and several Cork priests were on the Western Front; amongst them were two Farranferris priests Fr. Joe Scannell MC and Archdeacon T. F. Duggan MC.

In the autumn of 1922 one of the teachers as Farranferris, Patrick MacSwiney did a favour for his cousin Mary and took charge of a bag for a friend whose premises were in danger of being raided by government forces. Fr. MacSwiney did not examine the contents and deposited the bag in the Clifton convent in Montenotte (where he was chaplain). The convent was raided shortly afterwards, the bag was discovered and found to contain £3,000. It was rumoured that this was part of the £100,000 that had been robbed by republican forces from the Customs House in Dublin and that the priest had abused the nuns' trust by hiding the stolen money in the convent on behalf of Mary MacSwiney. The incident led to Fr. MacSwiney being removed from his clerical duties in Cork and sent to Dunmanway.

In the summer of 1923 the Great War veteran Fr. Joe Scannell replaced Patrick Sexton as President of Farranferris (Sexton would later become a parish priest at St. Patrick's and was instrumental in building St Patrick's School, Cork).

In his first year as president, Joe Scannell introduced an entrance exam for Farranferris, the newspaper notice advertising the new regime stated that pupils were being prepared for "the professions (the Church, Medicine, Law, Engineering, Primary and Secondary Training, etc.), Government Appointments, Commercial and Industrial Purposes".

=== Mid-to-late 20th century ===
The Golden Jubilee (fiftieth anniversary) of Farranferris college was celebrated in 1937. At the time it had 120 students.

In February 1938, Fr. Denny Murphy was made President of Farranferris.

In December 1945 T. F. Duggan, a former British Army Chaplain who had been a POW in WW1 and had won a medal for gallantry in WW2, was made President of Farranferris.

In June 1954, Fr. Daniel Luke Connolly was made President of Farranferris.

In 1960, St Finbarr's College, Farranferris was expanded (to the designs of James Boyd Barrett) to provide extra schoolroom accommodation and it began to take non-seminary boarders.

In September 1962, Fr. Carthach McCarthy was made President of Farranferris.

In 1969, Fr. Michael Murphy (later Bishop of Cork and Ross) was made President of Farranferris.

In 1976, Fr. John Buckley (later Bishop of Cork and Ross) was made President of Farranferris.

In July 1983, Fr. Micheál O Dálaigh was made President of Farranferris. He led the celebrations of the college's centenary in 1987, and remained President until 1990.

When uniforms were introduced Farranferris adopted a wine-coloured jumper with grey shirt and trousers.

=== Final decades ===
Fr. Noel O'Sullivan was President of Farranferris from 1990 to 1998.

Fr. Aidan O'Driscoll was the last President of Farranferris. He was President when the school closed to boarding pupils at the end of the 1999–2000 academic year, and up until its final closure in 2006.

=== Farranferris Education and Training Campus ===
Since Closure the old college has become the Farranferris Education and Training Campus, with Northside Community Enterprises becoming the main tenant. Farranferris hosts Gaelscoil Pheig Sayers, with some 280 children. In 2022 the Mater Dei Academy an Independent Catholic School (founded in 2020), moved onto the campus.

== Sports ==
The school was very successful at hurling, winning the Munster Dr. Harty Cup on seven occasions and going on to win the All Ireland Dr. Croke Cup five times.

== Literature ==
- Walsh, Fr. J. C.: Farranferris: The Heritage of St Finbarr 1887-1987. Tower Books, Cork 1987.
- Horgan, T.: Farna's Hurling Story, Publisher: St. Finbarr's Seminary, Farranferris, ISBN 0 9529671 03, 1996

== Notable pupils and staff ==
- Daniel Cohalan, Bishop of Cork
- Timothy Smiddy, Ireland's first Ambassador/Overseas Minister
- Aloys Fleischmann, Composer, Cathedral Organist and Choirmaster
- Patrick MacSwiney, Priest, Gaelic Scholar, Antiquarian, Historian and Teacher
- Seán Hyde, Revolutionary and Hurler
- Air Chief Marshal Sir Francis Fogarty, a senior commander in the Royal Air Force (RAF) during the Second World War
- Michael Joseph Sheehan, Brigadier in the British Army (service during World War I and World War II)
- Cornelius Lucey, Bishop of Cork/Bishop of Cork and Ross
- Aloys Fleischmann Jnr., Composer
- Daniel Costigan, Commissioner of An Garda Síochána
- Jerome Kiely, Poet
- John A. Murphy, Historian
- Seán Ó Riada, Composer and founder of Ceoltóirí Chualann
- Patrick Coveney, Archbishop, Apostolic Nuncio, 1960-66 member of College staff
- Bill O'Herlihy, Broadcaster
- John Buckley, Bishop of Cork and Ross
- Joe Walsh, Politician
- Finbar Wright, Singer
- John Minihan, Politician
- Jerry Buttimer, Politician
- Liam Twomey, Politician

=== Sport ===
- Dinny Barry-Murphy, Hurler
- Dr. Jim Young, Hurler and Gaelic Footballer
- Christy Ring, Hurler (Coached at Farranferris)
- Joe Kelly, Hurler
- Paddy Barry, Hurler
- Michael O Brien, Hurling Coach and Hurling Manager
- Terry Kelly, Hurler
- Denis O'Riordan, Hurler
- John Kevin Coleman, Hurler and Politician
- Seánie Barry, Hurler
- Donal "Donie" Collins, Hurler
- Francis Collins, Hurler
- Pat Barry, Hurler
- Tim Crowley, Hurler
- Tadhg Murphy, Hurler and Footballer
- Johnny Crowley, Hurler
- Kieran Kingston, Hurler and Hurling Manager
- Tom Kingston, Hurler
- Mark Foley, Hurler
- Kevin Murray, Hurler
- Donal O'Mahony, Hurler and Hurling Manager
- Mark Prendergast, Hurler
- Tom Kenny, Hurler
- Paul Tierney, Hurler
- John Gardiner, Hurler
- Shane Murphy, Hurler
