= John Murphy (bishop of Cork) =

Roman-catholic bishop

- Bishop of Cork
- Church: Catholic Church
- Diocese: Diocese of Cork
- In office: 21 February 1815 – 1 April 1847
- Predecessor: Francis Moylan
- Successor: William Delany
- Previous post: Coadjutor Bishop of Cork (1815)

Orders
- Ordination: 10 May 1795
- Consecration: 23 April 1815 by William Coppinger

Personal details
- Born: 23 May 1772 Shandon, Cork, County Cork, Kingdom of Ireland, British Empire
- Died: 1 April 1847 (aged 74) Cork, County Cork, United Kingdom of Great Britain and Ireland

John Murphy (23 May 1772 in Shandon, Cork – 1 April 1847, in Cork) was an Irish Roman Catholic Bishop in the nineteenth century.

Murphy commenced his priestly studies in Paris, leaving due to political unrest, he completed his studies at the Irish College at Lisbon he was ordained a priest in Lisbon on 10 May 1795. He was, consecrated Coadjutor Bishop of Cork on 21 February 1815 and its Diocesan on 23 April that year. He was a founding member of the Cork Savings Bank. He clashed with many groups during his episcopate before dying suddenly during the famine. Bishop Murphy is buried in St. Mary's Cathedral, where he had been baptised and served in as bishop.

Catholic Church titles
Preceded by Francis Moylan	Roman Catholic Bishop of Cork; 1815–1847	Succeeded by William Delany
