= Fintan Gavin =

Irish Roman Catholic prelate (born 1966)

The Most Reverend, Dr. Fintan Gavin HDip DCL
- Bishop of Cork and Ross
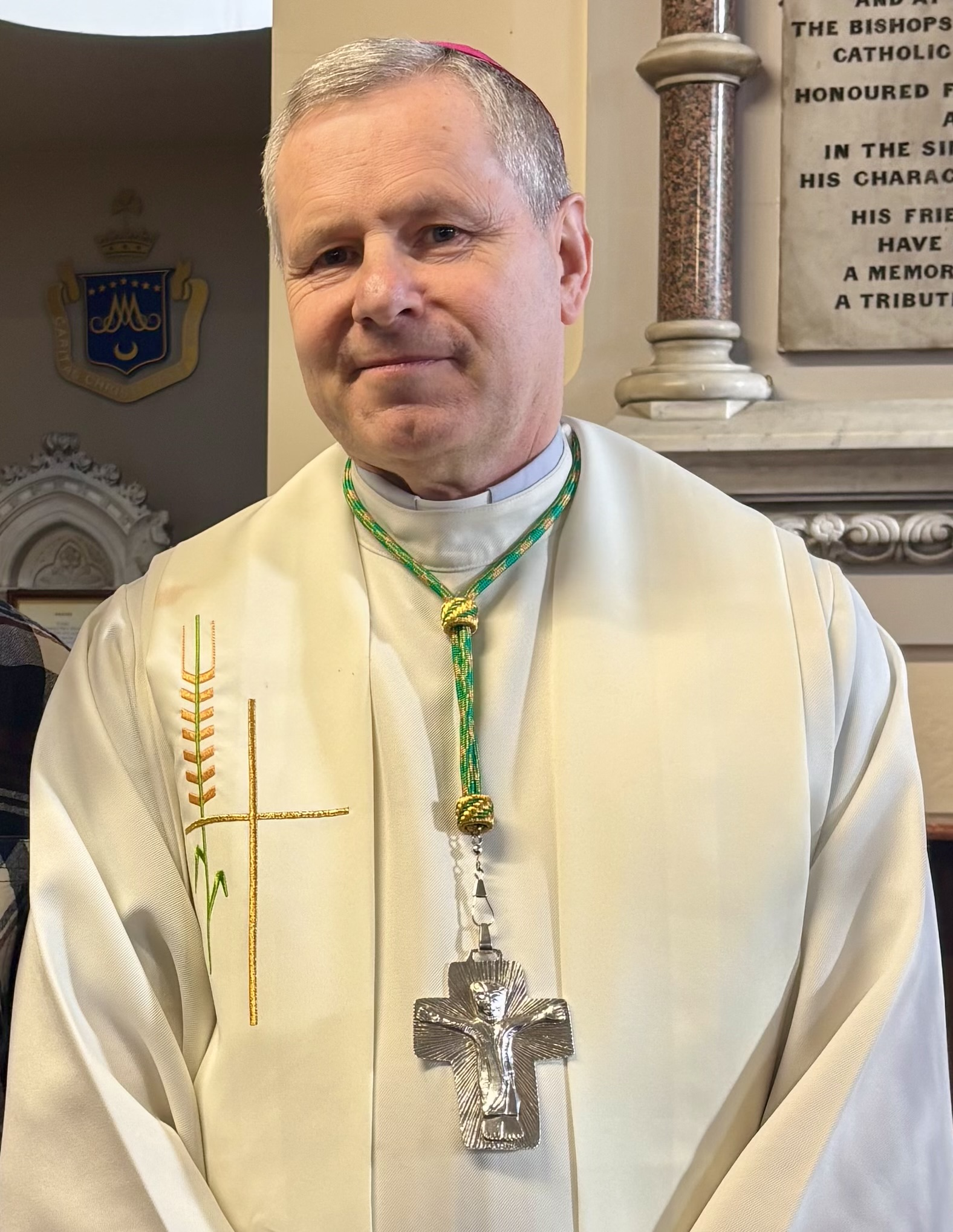
- Bishop Fintan Gavin
- Church: Roman Catholic
- Diocese: Cork and Ross
- Appointed: 8 April 2019
- Installed: 30 June 2019
- Predecessor: John Buckley
- Previous posts: Chancellor of the Archdiocese of Dublin; Parish chaplain in Our Lady of Victories parish, Ballymun Road; Teacher at Killinarden Community School and St Thomas' Community College

Orders
- Ordination: 7 June 1991 by Desmond Connell
- Consecration: 30 June 2019 by John Buckley

Personal details
- Born: 1 January 1966 (age 60) Dublin, Ireland
- Education: Pontifical Gregorian University; University College Dublin; Holy Cross College, Clonliffe

Styles of Fintan Gavin
- Reference style: The Most Reverend
- Spoken style: Your Grace
- Religious style: Bishop

Fintan Gavin (born 1 January 1966) is an Irish Roman Catholic prelate who has served as Bishop of Cork and Ross since 2019.

== Early life and education ==
Gavin was born in Dublin on 1 January 1966, to Michael and Angela Gavin, and baptised in St Andrew's Church, Westland Row on 5 January. He grew up in Marino, where he played hurling and football with St Vincent's GAA and was a member of Marino Athletic Club.

Prior to his seminary formation in Holy Cross College, Gavin had begun training as a residential social worker in Our Lady's Hostel, Eccles Street, from September 1983 to August 1984. During his seminary formation, he trained at Liberty Hall, the Northlands addiction treatment counselling centre in Derry, and St Patrick's University Hospital.

Gavin was ordained a deacon for the Archdiocese of Dublin by the Archbishop of Dublin, Desmond Connell, in the Church of the Holy Cross, Clonliffe, on 11 March 1990, and gained summer parish experience at Brentwood Cathedral, Essex. He was subsequently ordained a priest for the Archdiocese of Dublin by Auxiliary Bishop of Dublin, Éamonn Walsh, in St Vincent de Paul Church, Marino, on 7 June 1991.

== Presbyteral ministry ==
Following ordination, Gavin's first pastoral assignment was as curate in Holy Redeemer parish, Bray, where he also served as a teacher at St Thomas' Community College and chaplain to St Gerard's Junior and Senior School, and completed a higher diploma in education from University College Dublin. Gavin was appointed curate in Sacred Heart parish, Killinarden, Tallaght, in 1994, where he also served as a teacher at the local community school, while also gaining summer pastoral experience in Coram, New York between 1992 and 1995.

Gavin moved to Rome in 1996 to complete a licentiate in canon law from the Pontifical Gregorian University in 1999, and subsequently a doctorate in 2002, with a specialisation in rotal jurisprudence. His published dissertation was taken in large part from uncredited sources, according to plagiarism researcher Michael Dougherty. In his 2024 book about plagiarism at the Gregorian University, a chapter is devoted to Gavin's "renovation plagiarism", which reportedly includes text copied from a dissertation on canon law submitted at Catholic University of America in Washintgton, DC in 1938. During his time in Rome, he resided at the Pontifício Colégio Português. During his postgraduate studies, Gavin assisted at parishes in Florence and Benidorm through both summer and migrant ministries. Gavin also participated in the ministry of Community of Sant'Egidio and collaborated with the community of Missionarie di Cristo Risorto and ministries led by local university students. He also gained summer pastoral experience in Argentina, working with an indigenous community in Patagonia and accompanying a group of Italian university students on a mission experience in the Diocese of San Miguel.

Gavin returned to Dublin in 2002, where he was appointed curate in St Andrew's Church, Westland Row. During his time in Westland Row, he collaborated in a pastoral initiative centred around inviting and encouraging those who had drifted away to return to the church.

Gavin was appointed vice-chancellor of the Archdiocese of Dublin in 2003.

He was appointed parish chaplain in Our Lady of Victories parish, Ballymun Road, in 2010, serving as part of the parish grouping centred around Ballygall, Drumcondra and Glasnevin. During his time in Our Lady of Victories parish, Gavin developed the parish gospel choir to lead a Sunday evening Mass in the parish that was aimed at young people.

Gavin was subsequently appointed chaplain to the Italian-speaking community in the archdiocese in 2015 and chancellor in 2017. He also served as chaplain to the archdiocesan children's pilgrimage to Lourdes each Easter.

== Episcopal ministry ==
Gavin was appointed Bishop-elect of Cork and Ross by Pope Francis on 8 April 2019. His appointment was seen as historic, as he was the first bishop not to have previously served as auxiliary or coadjutor bishop since 1847, and the first bishop to be born outside the diocese since 1763.

Gavin was consecrated by his predecessor, John Buckley, on 30 June in the Cathedral of St Mary and St Anne, Cork.

He became the first bishop of the diocese to say a "station Mass" in November 2019.

Ahead of the publication of a pastoral letter in August 2022 which outlined a restructuring of diocesan structures, Gavin stated in an interview with The Echo that while the Catholic Church had served Ireland well in some aspects, its previously dominant role in Irish society had led to corruption and a loss of focus on mission. He also emphasised the importance of greater lay involvement over a focus on the priesthood in the process of renewal.
