= John O'Mahony (antiquarian) =

John O'Mahony (1844–1912) was an Irish Catholic priest, antiquarian, writer and founder member of the Cork Historical and Archaeological Society.

Born near Enniskean in County Cork in 1844, O'Mahony was educated in Bandon and Cork before attending St Patrick's College, Maynooth. He was ordained in 1870 and moved to Cork city where he was a curate in South (St. Finbar's) Parish.

During the 1880s, he was a supporter of the Land League, Home Rule movement and of Charles Stewart Parnell's Irish Parliamentary Party. This political position was at odds with that of the then Bishop of Cork, William Delany, who transferred O'Mahony out of Cork city to a rural parish. Despite an appeal to Rome, this "demotion" was not overturned. After Delany's death, O'Mahony returned to Cork to North (Cathedral) Parish.

In later life, O'Mahony was a supporter of the Gaelic League and was president of the Maynooth Union. Having "literary and antiquarian interests", he was a founder member of the Cork Historical and Archaeological Society, and contributed a number of articles to the society's journal.

O'Mahony died at Crookstown, County Kildare on 4 January 1912. A statue of him, reputedly weighing 11 tons, was erected in the Catholic church in Cloghduv.
