= Diocese of San Miguel =

There are two Roman Catholic dioceses named San Miguel

- Roman Catholic Diocese of San Miguel (El Salvador)
- Roman Catholic Diocese of San Miguel (Argentina)
