= John Buckley (bishop) =

Irish former Roman Catholic prelate (born 1939)

The Most Reverend, Dr. John Buckley
- Bishop Emeritus of Cork and Ross
- Church: Roman Catholic
- See: Cork and Ross
- Appointed: 19 December 1997
- Installed: 8 February 1998
- Term ended: 30 June 2019
- Predecessor: Michael Murphy
- Successor: Fintan Gavin
- Previous posts: Diocesan administrator of Cork and Ross; Auxiliary bishop of Cork and Ross; Titular bishop of Leptis Magna; Parish priest of Turners Cross parish, Cork; President of St Finbarr's College, Farranferris

Orders
- Ordination: 20 June 1965 by Cornelius Lucey
- Consecration: 29 April 1984 by Michael Murphy

Personal details
- Born: 2 November 1939 (age 86) Inchigeela, County Cork, Ireland
- Motto: Through Mary to Jesus

John Buckley (born 2 November 1939) is an Irish former Roman Catholic prelate who served as Bishop of Cork and Ross between 1998 and 2019.

== Early life and education ==
Buckley was born in Gruaige, Inchigeela, County Cork on 2 November 1939.

He is an accomplished road bowler, a sport which was described as being "like a virus for which there is no cure".

Buckley studied for the priesthood at St Patrick's College, Maynooth, and was subsequently ordained a priest for the Diocese of Cork and Ross on 20 June 1965.

== Presbyteral ministry ==
Buckley taught at St Finbarr's College, Farranferris, until he was subsequently appointed president of the college in 1975. He also served for one year as parish priest of Turners Cross parish, Cork.

== Episcopal ministry ==
=== Auxiliary Bishop of Cork and Ross ===
Buckley was appointed auxiliary bishop of Cork and Ross and titular bishop of Leptis Magna by Pope John Paul II on 16 March 1984. He was consecrated by the Bishop of Cork and Ross, Michael Murphy, on 29 April at the Cathedral of St Mary and St Anne, Cork.

Following the death of Murphy on 7 October 1996, Buckley was appointed diocesan administrator on 10 October.

=== Bishop of Cork and Ross ===
Buckley was appointed Bishop of Cork and Ross by Pope John Paul II on 19 December 1997.

He was installed on 8 February 1998 at the Cathedral of St Mary and St Anne, Cork.

Following his installation, Buckley did not move into the episcopal palace, continuing to live at a house in Turners Cross instead. He is also noted for promising in 2006 to personally invite Pope Benedict XVI to Cork, were the county senior hurling team to win a third All-Ireland championship in succession, a feat which ultimately was not achieved.

Buckley also supported calls by campaigners to make a mass grave for Magdalene women at Sunday's Well more accessible to the public, which followed his call for the remains of Little Nellie, considered the "unofficial patron saint of Cork", to be exhumed.

During his episcopate, Buckley also served as a member of the commission for pastoral care of the Irish Catholic Bishops' Conference, and chaired its council on healthcare.

== Retirement ==
In accordance with canon law, Buckley submitted his episcopal resignation to the Congregation for Bishops on his 75th birthday on 2 November 2014, but was expected to remain in the see until a successor was appointed.

He remained in the see until the appointment of his successor, Fintan Gavin, on 8 April 2019.

Styles of John Buckley
- Reference style: The Most Reverend
- Spoken style: Your Grace
- Religious style: Bishop
