= Daniel Cohalan (bishop of Cork) =

Irish Roman Catholic clergyman

The Most Reverend Daniel Cohalan
- Bishop of Cork
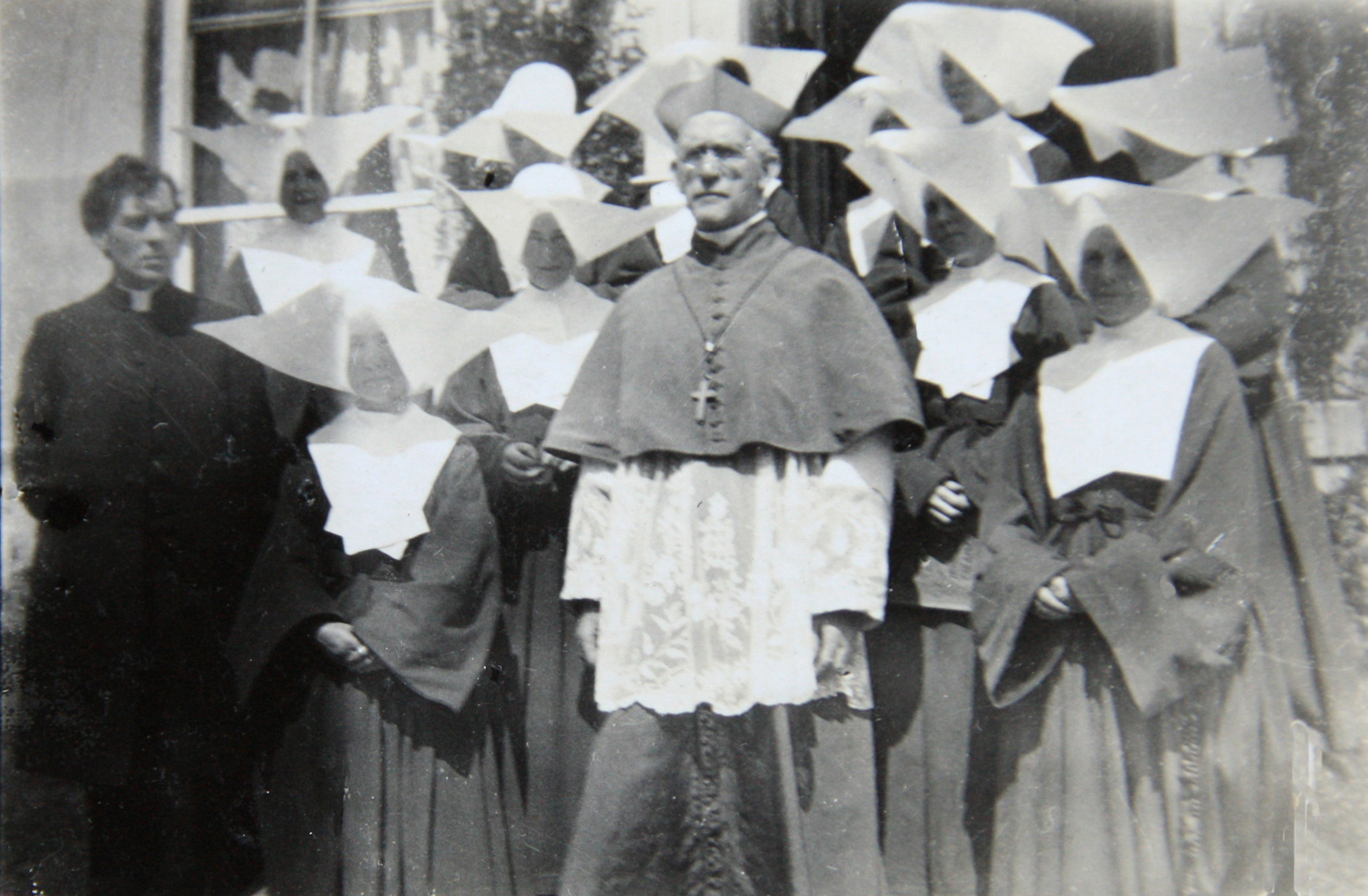
- Bishop Daniel Cohalan (centre) with the Reverend Patrick MacSwiney (left) and Sisters of Charity from Kinsale (circa 1928)
- Church: Catholic Church
- Province: Cashel and Emly
- Diocese: Cork
- Appointed: 29 August 1916
- Term ended: 24 August 1952
- Predecessor: Thomas Alphonsus O'Callaghan
- Successor: Cornelius Lucey
- Previous posts: Auxiliary Bishop of Cork and Titular Bishop of Vaga (1914–1916)

Orders
- Ordination: 25 July 1882
- Consecration: 7 June 1914 by John Harty

Personal details
- Born: 14 July 1858 Kilmichael, County Cork, Ireland
- Died: 24 August 1952 (aged 94) Bon Secours Hospital, Cork, Ireland
- Denomination: Roman Catholic
- Education: St Patrick's College, Maynooth

Daniel Cohalan (1858–1952) was an Irish Roman Catholic clergyman who served as the Bishop of Cork from 1916 to 1952.

== Early life ==
He was born in Kilmichael in County Cork, Ireland on 14 July 1858. After graduating at St Patrick's College, Maynooth, Cohalan was ordained a priest at the Cathedral of St Mary and St Anne, Cork on 25 July 1882. His first pastoral appointment was a curate at Kilbrittain, County Cork from October 1883 to January 1884. He briefly resumed his post-graduate studies at St Finbarr's Seminary (now College), Cork from January to November 1884. His second curacy was at Tracton, County Cork from November 1884 to September 1896. Cohalan returned to St. Patrick's College, Maynooth as a professor of Theology from 7 September 1896 to 7 June 1914.

== Episcopal career ==
He was appointed Auxiliary Bishop of Cork and Titular Bishop of Vaga on 25 May 1914. Cohalan was consecrated bishop at St Mary and St Anne's Cathedral on 7 June 1914 by John Harty, Archbishop of Cashel-Emly. Two years later, he was appointed Diocesan Bishop of Cork on 29 August 1916.

Cohalan was an outspoken critic during the Irish War of Independence, condemning acts of violence on both sides. In particular, he denounced the policy of reprisals. In July 1920, he pronounced an interdict on the killers of an RIC sergeant, shot dead in the church porch in Bandon. He declared that anyone killing from ambush would be excommunicated. On 12 December 1920, Cohalan, issued a decree saying that "anyone within the diocese of Cork who organises or takes part in ambushes or murder or attempted murder shall be excommunicated".[47] In turn, his life was threatened by the IRA. In August 1928, he condemned the British government which had allowed Terence McSwiney to die on hunger-strike in 1920.

Bessborough Mother & Baby Home was run by the Sisters of the Sisters of the Sacred Hearts of Jesus and Mary and when the Department of Local Government and Public Health "sought a change of superior in Bessborough because of the appallingly high death rate, he [Catholic Bishop of Cork Dr Daniel Cohalan] denounced the request. The replacement of the Bessborough superior was delayed for four years after the department requested it, and many infants died during that time. It seems probable that the bishop’s intervention was elicited by the congregation."

He died in office at Bon Secours Hospital, Cork on 24 August 1952, aged 94. Originally buried at St Finbarr's College, Farranferris, he was reinterred in the grounds of St Mary and St Anne's Cathedral, Cork in 1996.

His nephew of the same name, Daniel Cohalan, was Bishop of Waterford and Lismore from 1943 to 1965.

Catholic Church titles
| Preceded by Thomas Alphonsus O'Callaghan | Bishop of Cork; 1916–1952 | Succeeded by Cornelius Lucey |
