= Bishop Lucey =

Bishop Lucey may refer to:

- Robert Emmet Lucey (1891–1977) Bishop of Amarillo and Archbishop of San Antonio
- Cornelius Lucey (1902–82) Bishop of Cork and Ross
