= Thomas Alphonsus O'Callaghan =

Roman-catholic bishop

Thomas Alphonsus O'Callaghan OP
- Bishop of Cork
- Church: Catholic Church
- Diocese: Diocese of Cork
- In office: 14 November 1886 – 14 June 1916
- Predecessor: William Delany
- Successor: Daniel Cohalan
- Previous posts: Titular Bishop of Lambaesis (1884-1886); Coadjutor Bishop of Cork (1884-1886)

Orders
- Ordination: July 1863
- Consecration: 29 June 1884 by Giovanni Simeoni

Personal details
- Born: 9 May 1839 Cork, County Cork, United Kingdom of Great Britain and Ireland
- Died: 14 June 1916 (aged 77) Cork, County Cork, United Kingdom of Great Britain and Ireland

Thomas Alphonsus O’Callaghan (9 May 1839 – 14 June 1916) was an Irish Roman Catholic bishop who was born and died in Cork.

O'Callaghan was educated at Minerva College, Rome and ordained a Dominican priest in 1863. He received the degree of Doctor of Divinity (DD). He became Prior of St Clement's, Rome in 1881. William Delany, Bishop of Cork preferred successor was the Dean of Cork, Henry Neville but he was viewed unfavourably by Thomas Croke, the Archbishop of Cashel and O'Callaghan was selected. He was consecrated coadjutor bishop of Cork in 1884 before succeeding in 1886. He died in post in 1916.

Catholic Church titles
Preceded by William Delany	Roman Catholic Bishop of Cork; 1886–1916	Succeeded by Daniel Cohalan
