= Diocese of Cork and Ross =

The Diocese of Cork and Ross can refer to:

- The Roman Catholic Diocese of Cork and Ross
- The former Church of Ireland diocese of Cork and Ross is now incorporated within the united Diocese of Cork, Cloyne and Ross
