= Cork Cathedral =

Cork Cathedral refers to two cathedrals which are located in Cork, Ireland:

- Cathedral of St Mary and St Anne, a Roman Catholic cathedral, often known locally as North Cathedral
- Saint Fin Barre's Cathedral, a Church of Ireland cathedral, often known locally as South Cathedral
