= Bishop of Cork =

The Bishop of Cork was a separate episcopal title which took its name after the city of Cork in Ireland. The title is now united with other bishoprics. In the Church of Ireland it is held by the Bishop of Cork, Cloyne and Ross, and in the Roman Catholic Church it is held by the Bishop of Cork and Ross.

== Pre-Reformation bishops ==
The diocese of Cork was one of the twenty-four dioceses established at the Synod of Rathbreasail on an ancient bishopric founded by Saint Finbarr in the sixth-century.

On 30 July 1326, Pope John XXII, on the petition of King Edward II of England, issued a papal bull for the union of the bishoprics of Cork and Cloyne, the union to take effect on the death of either bishop. The union should have taken effect on the death of Philip of Slane in 1327, however, bishops were still appointed to each separate bishopric. The union eventually took place with Jordan Purcell appointed bishop of the united see of Cork and Cloyne in 1429.

List of pre-Reformation Bishops of Cork
From	Until	Incumbent	Notes
unknown	1147	Ua Menngoráin	Died in office
bef.1148	1172	Gilla Áedha Ua Maigín	Died in office; also known as Gregorius.
fl.1173–77	1182	Gregorius Ua h-Aedha	Died in office
c.1182	1187	Reginaldus I	Died in office
c.1187	1188	Aicher	Died in office
bef.1192	1206	Murchad Ua h-Áedha	Died in office
bef.1208	1224	Mairín Ua Briain, O.S.A.	Translated to Cashel 20 June 1224; also known as Marinus.
1225	aft.1237	Gilbertus	Elected before 5 June 1225; died after 1237.
1248	1265	Laurentius	Elected before 5 May 1248; died before 27 March 1265.
1265	1267	William of Jerpoint, O.Cist.	Elected after 27 March 1265; received possession of temporalities 28 November 1266; died after 8 July 1267.
1267	1276	Reginaldus II	Elected before 5 August 1267; died 16 December 1276.
1277	1302	Robert Mac Donnchada, O.Cist.	Elected before 8 May 1277; received possession of temporalities 11 June 1277; lib. 13 October 1277; died 6 March 1302.
1302	1321	Seoán Mac Cearbaill	Elected 30 April 1302; received possession of temporalities 12 June 1302; lib 20 July 1302; translated to Meath 20 February 1321.
1321	1327	Philip of Slane, O.P.	Appointed 20 February 1321; temp 16 July 1321; died after March 1327.
1327	1329	Walter le Rede	Appointed 20 March 1327; consecrated before 12 July 1327; temp 18 October 1327; translated to Cashel 20 October 1329.
1330	1347	John of Ballyconingham	Translated from Down before January 1329; received possession of temporalities 30 May 1330; died 29 May 1347.
1347	1358	John Roche	Elected before December 1347; consecrated December 1347; died 4 July 1358.
1359	1393	Gerald de Barri	Appointed before 14 February 1359 and consecrated irregularly soon afterwards; received possession of temporalities 2 February 1360; appointed again 8 November 1362 and confirmed 1 February 1365; died 4 January 1393.
1396	1406	Roger Ellesmere	Appointed 3 December 1395; received possession of temporalities 31 March 1396; died before 14 February 1406.
1406	1409	Richard Kynmoure	Appointed before 6 October 1406; died before June 1409.
1409	unknown	Milo fitzJohn	Appointed by Pope Gregory XII July 1409; appointed again by Pope Martin V 11 January 1418; died mid-June 1431
1409	1417	Patrick Fox	Appointed by Antipope Alexander V 14 October 1409; confirmed by Antipope John XXIII 25 May 1410; translated to Ossory 15 December 1417.
1425		John Paston, O.S.B.	Prior of Brownholm; appointed 23 May 1425 but did not possession of the see; died in Utrecht before 1459.
In 1429, the see united with Cloyne to form the united see of Cork and Cloyne

== Post-Reformation bishops ==
Following the Reformation, the united see of Cork and Cloyne continued with parallel apostolic successions. In the Church of Ireland, the title eventually became part of the current united bishopric of Cork, Cloyne and Ross.

In the Roman Catholic Church, Cork and Cloyne remained united until 10 December 1747 when Pope Benedict XIV decreed them to be separated. Cloyne became part of the united bishopric of Cloyne and Ross until 24 November 1850 when they were separated. The see of Cork remained a separate bishopric until 19 April 1958 when it united with Ross to form the current united bishopric of Cork and Ross.

List of post-Reformation Roman Catholic Bishops of Cork
From	Until	Incumbent	Notes
1748	1763	Richard Walsh	Appointed 10 January 1748; died 7 January 1763
1763	1787	John Butler	Appointed 16 April 1763; also became 12th Baron Dunboyne in 1785; resigned as bishop 13 December 1787; died 8 May 1800.
1787	1815	Francis Moylan	Translated from Ardfert and Aghadoe 19 June 1787; died 10 February 1815
1815	1847	John Murphy	Appointed coadjutor bishop 25 January 1815; succeeded 10 February 1815; consecrated 23 April 1815; died 1 April 1847
1847	1886	William Delany	Appointed 9 July 1847; consecrated 15 August 1847; died 14 November 1886
1886	1916	Thomas Alphonsus O'Callaghan, O.P.	Appointed coadjutor bishop 29 June 1884; succeeded 14 November 1886; died 14 June 1916
1916	1952	Daniel Cohalan	Appointed an auxiliary bishop 25 May and consecrated 7 June 1914; appointed Bishop of Cork 29 August 1916; died 24 August 1952
1952	1958	Cornelius Lucey	Appointed coadjutor bishop 18 November 1950; consecrated 14 January 1951; succeeded 24 August 1952; also appointed Apostolic Administrator of Ross 20 February 1954; subsequently bishop of Cork and Ross when the two dioceses were united in 1958
Since 1958, the see has been part of the united diocese of Cork and Ross

== See also ==
- Abbot of Cork
