= Mark Prendergast (hurler) =

Irish hurler

Personal information
- Native name: Marc de Priondragás (Irish)
- Born: 1978 (age 47–48) Cork, Ireland

Sport
- Sport: Hurling
- Position: Right wing-back
Club
- Years: Club
- Na Piarsaigh
Club titles
- Cork titles: 1
Inter-county*
Years	County	Apps (scores)
2001-2004	Cork	2 (0-00)
Inter-county titles
- Munster titles: 1
- All-Irelands: 0
- NHL: 0
- All Stars: 0
- *Inter County team apps and scores correct as of 22:50, 5 August 2014.

Mark Prendergast (born 1978) is an Irish hurler who played as a right wing-back for the Cork senior team.

Born in Cork, Prendergast first played competitive hurling whilst at school at St. Finbarr's College. He arrived on the inter-county scene at the age of seventeen when he first linked up with the Cork minor team, before later joining the under-21 side and winning his first Munster and All-Ireland Medals. He joined the senior panel during the 2001 championship. He also played with the Cork Intermediate Hurlers in 2001 winning his second Munster and All-Ireland medals that year. Prendergast went on to play a bit part for Cork, and won one Munster medal. He was an All-Ireland runner-up as a non-playing substitute on one occasion.

At club level Prendergast is a one-time championship medalist with Na Piarsaigh.

Throughout his career Prendergast made just two Senior championship appearances for Cork. He retired form inter-county hurling following the Corks first Munster Championship game in 2004

== Playing career ==
=== Club ===
Prendergast enjoyed much success as a dual player at underage levels with Na Piarsaigh.

In 2004 Prendergast was captain of the Na Piarsaigh senior hurling team that faced Cloyne in the championship decider. A remarkable second-half display blew away the challenge of a Cloyne side in search of their first ever senior title. The 0-17 to 0-10 victory gave Prendergast a Cork Senior Hurling Championship medal.

=== Inter-county ===
Prendergast first played for Cork as a member of the minor hurling team in 1996. Cork's campaign ended with a 0-16 to 1-9 Munster semi-final defeat by Tipperary. He was also a member of the Cork minor football team in 1996 playing at corner back in which he captained the team to the Munster final losing to Kerry on a scoreline of Kerry 3–09 (18) Cork 2–06 (12) in Páirc Uí Chaoimh

Two years later in 1998 Prendergast had joined the Cork under-21 hurling team. He won his first Munster medal that year following a 3-18 to 1-10 victory over Tipperary. For the second year in-a-row Cork later faced Galway in the All-Ireland decider. In a close game Cork just about secured a 2-15 to 2-10 victory, with Prendergast winning an All-Ireland medal.

The following year in 1999 he was a member of the Cork U21 Hurling and Football teams playing at half back in the Munster U21 football final that again lost to Kerry on a scoreline of Kerry 1–10(13) Cork 0-07 in Austin Stack Park Tralee.

Three years later in 2001 he won his second Munster and All-Ireland hurling medal with the Cork Intermediate Hurling team. He played at center back that day as Cork beat Wexford in Fraher Field on a scoreline of Cork 2-17 - 2-08 Wexford on the 28 October 2001.

Prendergast was an unused substitute for Cork during their short-lived championship campaign. After being dropped from the panel the following year, he was recalled to the panel in 2003. On 29 June 2003 Prendergast made his senior championship debut when he came on as a substitute in Cork's 3-16 to 3-12 Munster final defeat of Waterford. After missing Cork's drawn All-Ireland semi-final with Wexford through injury, Prendergast again played a cameo role in their subsequent victory in the replay. He remained on the substitutes' bench in Cork's subsequent 1-14 to 1-11 All-Ireland final defeat by Kilkenny.

In 2004 Prendergast played in all but one of Cork's National Hurling League games, however, he left the panel after the Cork v Kerry Munster Hurling Championship match after being an unused substitute on the day.

=== Team ===
Na Piarsaigh

- Cork Senior Hurling Championship (1): 2004 (c)

Cork

- Munster Senior Hurling Championship (1): 2003
- All-Ireland Intermediate Hurling Championship (1) 2001
- Munster Intermediate Hurling Championship (1) 2001]]
- All-Ireland Under-21 Hurling Championship (1): 1998
- Munster Under-21 Hurling Championship (1): 1998
