= Jerome Kiely =

Irish poet (1925–2019)

Jerome Kiely (23 May 1925 – 7 July 2019) was an Irish poet and Roman Catholic priest.

== Life and career ==
Born in Kinsale, County Cork on 23 May 1925, Kiely was educated at the county's diocesan college and at St. Patrick's, Maynooth. He was ordained a priest in 1950 and he won the Adam Prize for poetry in 1956.

Kiely was still working as the Parish Priest of Aughadown (near Skibbereen) until 1995 when he was removed by Bishop Michael Murphy after allegations of sexual abuse of an altar boy came to light. No complaints were made to the Gardai.

He published Swallows in December in 2006, and The Moon Canoe in 2010.

Kiely died in County Cork on 7 July 2019, at the age of 94.

== Sources ==
- Irish Poetry of Faith and Doubt: The Cold Heaven, p. 187, ed. John F. Deane, Wolfhound Press, 1990.
