= William Delany (bishop) =

Roman-catholic bishop

- Bishop of Cork
- Church: Catholic Church
- Diocese: Diocese of Cork
- In office: 9 July 1847 – 14 November 1886
- Predecessor: John Murphy
- Successor: Thomas Alphonsus O'Callaghan

Orders
- Ordination: 8 January 1828
- Consecration: 15 August 1847 by Michael Slattery

Personal details
- Born: 25 December 1804 Bandon, County Cork, United Kingdom of Great Britain and Ireland
- Died: 14 November 1886 (aged 81) Cork, County Cork, United Kingdom of Great Britain and Ireland

William Delany (Latin: Gulielmus Delany; 25 December 1804, Bandon, County Cork – 14 November 1886, Cork) was an Irish Roman Catholic bishop.

Delany was ordained a priest on 8 January 1828. He received the degree of Doctor of Divinity (DD). His first appointment was as chaplain at Cork City Jail. Later he was parish priest in his home town of Bandon until his episcopal appointment. He was consecrated Bishop of Cork on 15 September 1847. In 1881, he demoted two priests who espoused the cause of Irish nationalism. These priests, John O'Mahony and Denis McCarthy, were reputedly transferred "from a Cork city parish to rural parishes" for their perceived support of Charles Stewart Parnell and the Land League.

Catholic Church titles
Preceded by John Murphy	Roman Catholic Bishop of Cork; 1847–1886	Succeeded by Thomas Alphonsus O'Callaghan
