= Seán Hyde =

Irish hurler (1897–1977)

Personal information
- Native name: Seán de hÍde (Irish)
- Born: 17 April 1897 Bandon, County Cork, Ireland
- Died: 12 April 1977 (aged 79) Glanmire, County Cork, Ireland
- Occupation: Veterinary surgeon

Sport
- Sport: Hurling
- Position: Full-back
Clubs
- Years: Club
- Cork Collegians; Dublin Collegians
Club titles
- Dublin titles: 3
Inter-county
- Years: County
- 1915-1916 1917-1919: Cork; Dublin
Inter-county titles
- Munster titles: 1
- Leinster titles: 2
- All-Irelands: 1

John Francis Hyde (17 April 1897 – 12 April 1977), also known as Seán Hyde, was an Irish hurler who played in various positions for the Cork and Dublin senior teams.

Hyde was born in Ballinhassig and was educated at St Finbarr's College, Farranferris. With 'Farna' he won the 1914 Cork Junior Cup and in the following year he was called-up by Cork to play in the All-Ireland Senior Hurling Championship, he was only 17 years old. He subsequently joined the Dublin team and was a regular on the inter-county scene until his retirement after the 1919 championship. During that time he won one All-Ireland medal, two Leinster medals and one Munster medal. Hyde was an All-Ireland runner-up on two occasions.

He was heavily involved in Intelligence work in the Irish War of Independence and Irish Civil War and was a trusted aid of Michael Collins.

At club level Hyde won three county club championship medals with Collegians.

== Plating career ==
=== Club ===
Hyde began his club hurling career with the Collegians in Cork. His studies later took him to Dublin where he joined the Collegians club there. His tenure was a successful one as he won three successive championship medals between 1917 and 1919.

=== Inter-county ===
Hyde first came to prominence on the inter-county scene as a member of the Cork senior hurling team in 1915. Success was instant as he won a Munster medal following an 8-2 to 2-1 demolition of reigning All-Ireland champions Clare. Cork later reached the All-Ireland decider and were installed as the hot favourites against Laois. At half-time Cork were ahead by a single point, however, a torrential downpour changed the game and Hyde's side lost by 6-2 to 4-1.

After an unsuccessful 1916 championship with Cork, Hyde subsequently joined the Dublin senior team. In his debut season in 1917 the Metropolitans qualified for the provincial decider. A 5-1 to 4-0 defeat of reigning provincial champions Kilkenny gave Hyde his first Leinster medal. The subsequent All-Ireland final pitted Dublin against Tipperary. A 5-4 to 4-2 victory gave Hyde an All-Ireland medal.

Dublin surrendered their titles the following year, however, a 1-5 to 1-2 defeat of Kilkenny gave Hyde a second Leinster medal in 1919. The All-Ireland final saw Dublin line out against Hyde's native Cork. "The Rebels" were coasting at half-time with Jimmy Kennedy having scored four goals. He had two more disallowed to give his side a 4-2 to 1-1 lead. Cork also dominated the second-half to secure a 6-4 to 2-4 victory.

== Honours ==
=== Team ===
Dublin Collegians

- Dublin Senior Club Hurling Championship (3): 1917, 1918, 1919

Cork

- Munster Senior Hurling Championship (1): 1915

Dublin

- All-Ireland Senior Hurling Championship (1): 1919
- Leinster Senior Hurling Championship (2): 1917, 1919
