= Patrick MacSwiney =

Irish Catholic Priest and founder of the Kinsale Regional Museum

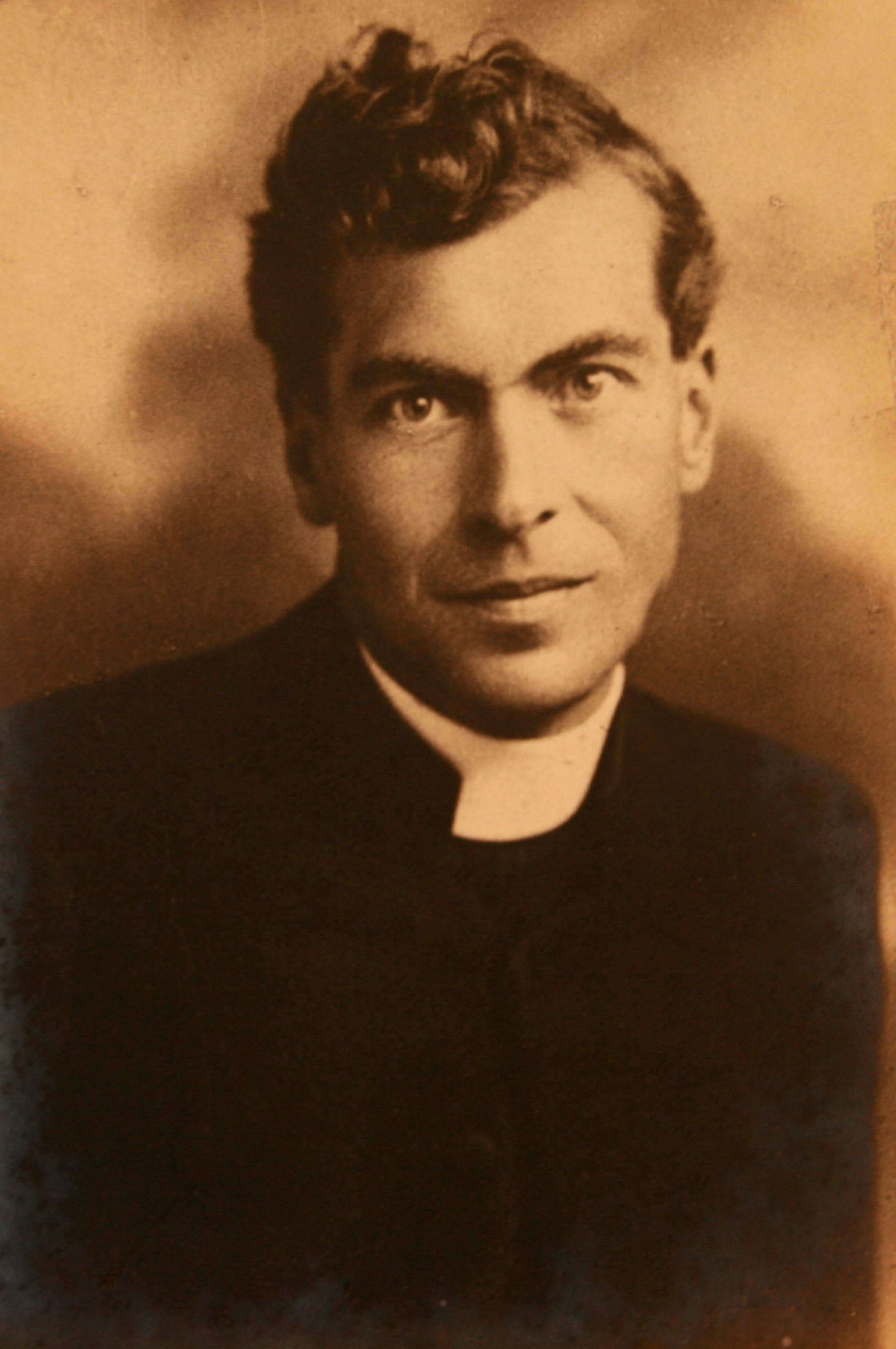
Rev. Patrick J. MacSwiney

Rev. Patrick J. MacSwiney (frequently spelled McSwiney or MacSweeney, 16 March 1885 – 16 November 1940) was an Irish Catholic priest, Gaelic scholar, antiquarian, historian, teacher, founder of the Kinsale Regional Museum, and benefactor of the people in the parishes in which he worked.

== Life ==
Born in Cork as one of the three children of Terence McSweeney, a boot maker, he became a draper's clerk at the age of 16, before beginning his studies for the priesthood at St. Patrick's College, Maynooth, where he was ordained on 18 June 1911. Like all newly ordained Irish priests, he was sent to serve in Britain: he worked for three years in Liverpool. There, in addition to his pastoral duties, he studied at the University College Liverpool under the Celtic scholar Professor Kuno Meyer, and was awarded a master's degree in 1914. He returned to Cork in 1914, became chaplain to Clifton Convalescent Home and convent in Montenotte, and was appointed to the staff of St Finbarr’s Seminary of Farranferris as professor of Irish, Greek and Latin. (In addition to these three languages, he was fluent in French, German and Italian).

He joined the Gaelic League, was a member of the Cork Dramatic Society, which had been founded in 1908 by Daniel Corkery and Patrick MacSwiney's cousin Terence MacSwiney. The priest was a founding member of the Cork Twenty Club, set up in 1915 by twenty citizens to provide a forum for local writers and artists; he was on the council of the Munster Society of Arts, established after the civil war, as Daniel Corkery wrote: “for the purpose of developing and fostering the fine arts, now practically nonexistent in our midst”.

Among his close friends were his cousins Annie, Mary and Terence MacSwiney, Daniel Corkery, William F.P. Stockley and his Munich wife Germaine, née Kolb, John Horgan, Arnold Bax, Aloys Fleischmann and Tilly Fleischmann. He studied the piano with the latter and gave lecture-recitals with her; he frequently delivered introductory talks before performances of Aloys Fleischmann's Cathedral choir at broadcasts from the Honan Chapel of University College Cork. He lectured regularly to the Cork Historical and Archaeological Society, the Cork Literary and Scientific Society, the Cork School of Art, the Cork Twenty Club, the Munster Society of Arts, and at the University.

== In trouble with the bishop ==
Towards the end of 1922, MacSwiney's time in Cork came to an abrupt end due to a conflict with his bishop, Dr Daniel Cohalan. Mary MacSwiney was the unwitting cause of her cousin being banished to act as chaplain to the workhouse and to a convent in the remote parish of Dunmanway.

During the civil war the MacSwiney sisters were on the republican, anti-Treaty side in opposition to the pro-Treaty Free State government. In the autumn of 1922, Patrick MacSwiney had, at Mary's request, taken charge of a bag for a friend whose premises were in danger of being raided by government forces. MacSwiney did not examine the contents and deposited the bag in the Clifton convent of which he was chaplain, which was raided shortly afterwards by Free State government forces. The bag was found to contain £3,000. It was rumoured by government supporters that this was part of the £100,000 that had been robbed by republican forces from the Customs House in Dublin and that the priest had abused the nuns' trust by hiding the stolen money in the convent on behalf of Mary MacSwiney.

The incident led to his being removed from his clerical duties in Cork and sent to Dunmanway.

== Banished to Dunmanway ==
MacSwiney found his exile in Dunmanway difficult: he was now far from his friends, having to travel a considerable distance to hear their music, a luxury he could now only rarely afford. Sometimes duties were assigned to him which prevented him from attending concerts in Cork. On one such occasion, when he had been obliged to officiate at a funeral in the country, he had missed Tilly Fleischmann’s performance with the Brodsky Quartet. He wrote to her:

"… you could not have felt my sense of loss: no musician could ever sound the depths of longing which a mere ignorant lover of music like I suffer from. I would have given kingdoms, yea the whole world (were I not alas, as I am, only a beggar) to have heard this music. To you and A[loys] music is a science, an ideal art, but to me it is the only thing in life that satisfies the gnawing of my soul-hunger, the terrible hunger of an untutored savage. Music alone makes me believe that even I have been moulded to 'the image and likeness of God' – as every Christian is supposed to believe."

His acute sense of deprivation illustrates the cultural stagnation of rural Ireland which Corkery spoke of when presenting the Munster Society of Arts, which Canon Sheehan had described with such feeling in My New Curate, and which George Russell had combated with his work for the cooperative movement and his journal The Irish Homestead. Like these three men, MacSwiney never faltered in his efforts to cultivate the wasteland. In Dunmanway he founded the West Cork Feis [festival] and established a dramatic society, which put on numerous fine plays and co-operated with Fleischmann's Bantry Choral Society.

== Ministry in Kinsale ==
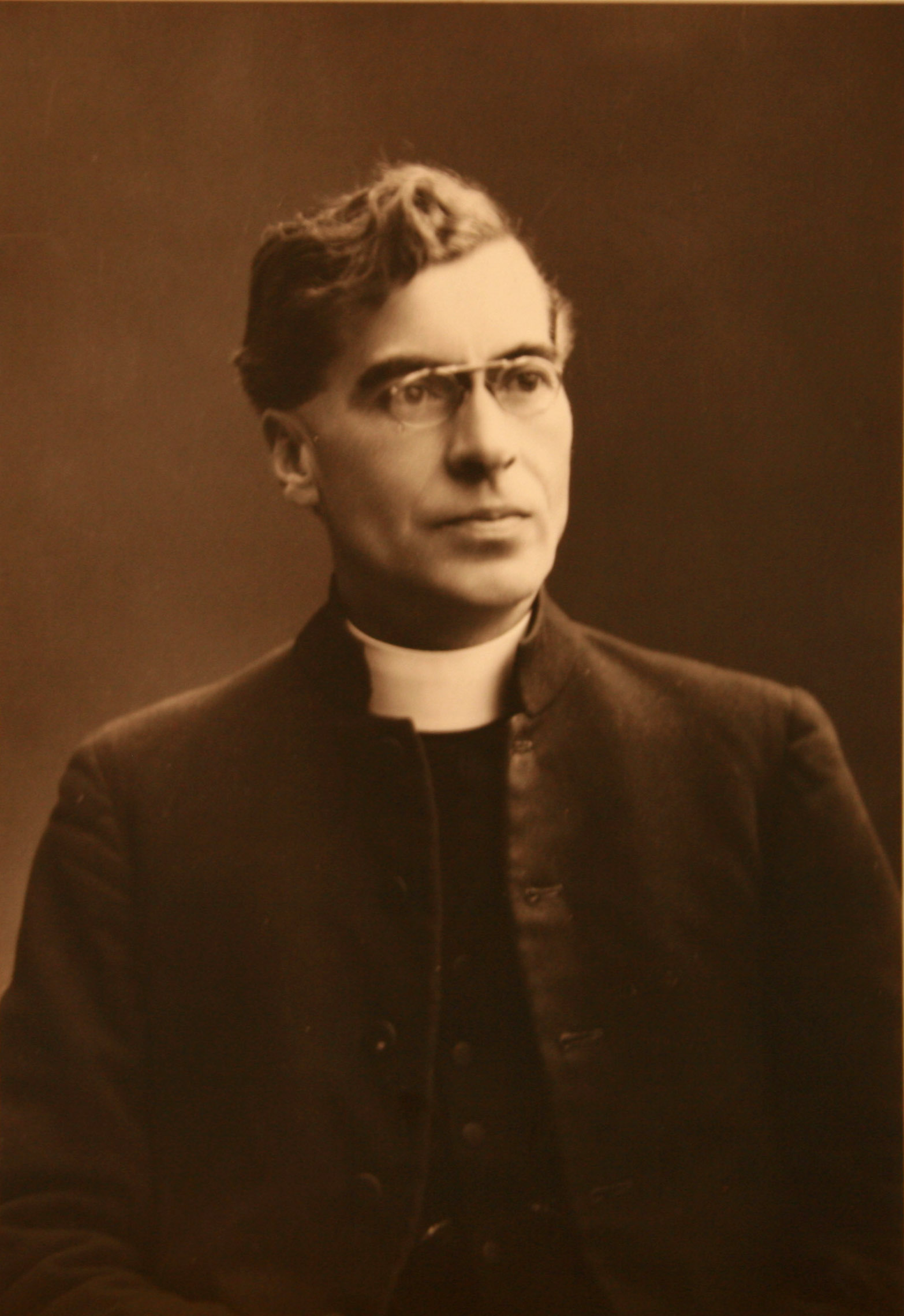
Rev. Patrick J. MacSwiney c. 1935

In December 1927 he was sent, to his great joy, to work as curate in Kinsale, County Cork, albeit under a very conservative archdeacon.

Following the civil war, the harbour town was in an extremely depressed condition. The fishing industry was declining, the railway line had been closed down, and the British military base had ceased to exist after the establishment of the Irish Free State. There was high levels of poverty, unemployment and emigration.

MacSwiney visited the poor regularly; he ministered to the orphans in the Convent of Mercy, putting on theatrical shows with them and taking them on annual excursions. He set about founding organisations for the development of the town: these included the Kinsale Development Association, the Kinsale Vocational Education Committee, the Creamery Committee, and the Sea Fishing Association.

MacSwiney aided in the establishment of a technical school which would offer vocational training to young people. It opened on 26 September 1940, less than seven weeks before his death. He campaigned for support for fishermen to revive the sea-fishing industry, which was in a dire state due to decline of stocks near the coast and lack of trawlers and adequate equipment. He worked for the founding of a creamery, which opened on 1 August 1940, for a housing scheme for the poor, for the provision of an adequate water supply for the town, for the promotion of tourism, for a new graveyard. He had much support from citizens such as Séamas Breathnach and Eamonn O'Neill, a local businessman and member of the Dáil who had brought electricity to Kinsale in 1920.

MacSwiney aimed at creating a sense of civic pride among the townspeople, particularly the young, and campaigned to save historic buildings; he succeeded in having Desmond Castle classified as a national monument and restored. He promoted Irish through the Gaelic League, produced plays in English and Irish, was president of the local branch of the Gaelic Athletic Association GAA, he organised a pageant to commemorate the Battle of Kinsale of 1601. He researched the rich history of the town, published scholarly articles on the subject, established the Kinsale History Society, and worked for years with the Society collecting material to set up the Kinsale Regional Museum, which opened on 11 September 1940.

He died at Golding's Private Hospital in Wellington Road, Cork on 16 November 1940, aged 55.

== Significance ==
The esteem in which he was held was manifested at his death. The Southern Star wrote that business in the town came to a standstill from the news of his death to the funeral. Tributes came from all sections of the local community and from numerous organisations in Cork. He was buried in St Eltin's Cemetery, the graveyard which he had helped to establish.

John J. Horgan wrote: “Those who were privileged to witness his last silent homecoming, when the men of Kinsale carried his remains through the twilight streets amidst a reverent and stricken people to the old Church where he had ministered so long, knew that this saintly cultured priest and true patriot had not worked in vain.”

Terry Connolly said of him at a commemoration in 2012: “He found Kinsale on its knees and he raised it to its feet. The Vocational School, St Eltin’s Graveyard and the seat on the Low Road were all monuments to Fr McSwiney but it is the fact that so many people still remember and honour him after all these years that is the greatest memorial of all.”

== Ecclesiastical appointments ==
- Ministry abroad: Liverpool, England: 1911–1914
- Chaplain, Clifton Convent and Convalescent Home, Montenotte, Cork: 20/3/1914–7/12/1922
- Appointment to the teaching staff of St. Finbarr's Seminary, Farranferris, Cork: 20/3/1914-7/12/1922
- Chaplain, Dunmanway Workhouse, Dunmanway, County Cork: 7/12/1922-4/12/1927
- Chaplain, St. Mary’s Convent Dunmanway, County Cork: 7/12/1922-4/12/1927
- Curate, Kinsale, County Cork: 4/12/1927–16 November 1940

== Activities ==
- Member of the Gaelic League
- Member of the Cork Dramatic Society
- Founding member of the Cork Twenty Club
- Council member of the Munster Society of Arts
- Member of the Cork School of Music Committee from 1918 (with Terence MacSwiney, Daniel Corkery and Fr Christy O’Flynn)
- Founder of the Dunmanway Dramatic Society
- Founder of the West Cork Feis [festival] in Dunmanway, County Cork
- Chairman of the Kinsale Vocational Education Committee
- Member of County Cork Vocational Committee
- Member of the National Monuments Committee
- Council Member of the Cork Historical and Archaeological Society from 1937
- Chairman of the Kinsale Development Association
- Chairman of the Kinsale Creamery Committee
- Chairman of the Kinsale Historical Society

== Published writings ==
- "The Cork Twenty Club" (with Seán MacAonghusa), Cork Twenty Club, n.d., probably c. 1922
- "Reply to Bishop's Letter", Cork Examiner 30 November 1923
- "Obituary: Canon Martin Murphy", Journal of the Cork Historical and Archaeological Society 1938, Vol. 43, No. 157, p. 65
- "Eighteenth Century Kinsale" Journal of the Cork Historical and Archaeological Society 1938, Vol. 43, No. 158, pp. 75–95
- "Georgian Kinsale: Garrison and Townfolk" Journal of the Cork Historical and Archaeological Society 1939, Vol. 44, No. 159, pp. 94–116
- "The Defeat of the Church in Penal Kinsale" Journal of the Cork Historical and Archaeological Society 1941, Vol. 46, No. 164, pp. 100–109

== Tributes ==
- 1941 Nov 1: Kinsale Museum named "The Father McSwiney Kinsale Regional Museum"
- 1940 Dec 12: Vocational Educational Committee decides to place a MacSwiney Memorial plaque in the Kinsale Technical School
- 1941 Nov 17: Memorial in honour of MacSwiney erected by the people of Kinsale in St Eltin’s Cemetery; oration by John J. Horgan
- 1941 MacSwiney commemorative seat placed on the Low Road, Scilly, Kinsale
- 1958 June 7: Painting of Rev. MacSwiney presented by Col. F. Lucey to be hung in the new Kinsale Regional Museum
- 2012 MacSwiney Commemorative seat in Scilly, Kinsale restored at the initiative of the Kinsale Historical Society

== Literature ==
- "Rev. Patrick MacSwiney", The Southern Star, 21 November 1940
- "Funeral of Rev. P. McSwiney, Kinsale", The Cork Examiner, 20 November 1940
- "The Late Rev. P. McSwiney", The Southern Star, 30 November 1940
- John J. Horgan, "Obituary: Rev. Patrick McSwiney, C.C., M.A.", Journal of the Cork Historical and Archaeological Society Part 2, Vol. XLV, No. 162, July–Dec 1940, pp. 139–140
- W. Malachy Lynch, O. Carm. Pilgim’s Newsletter Aylesford, No. 113, Carmelite Priory Aylesford, Kent, May 1972
- Terry Connolly, "Rev. Patrick McSwiney", The Kinsale Record 5.7., 1995
- Leo McMahon, "Kinsale group restores seat honouring remarkable Fr. Patrick McSwiney", The Southern Star, 13 November 2012
- Ruth Fleischmann, "The Bishop of Cork and the MacSwineys during the Irish Civil War", The Kinsale Record, Vol. 23, 2015, pp. 116–135
- Ruth Fleischmann, 'MacSwiney, Patrick John', Dictionary of Irish Biography, Cambridge 2017 (online edition)
