= Michael Collins (bishop) =

Roman Catholic Bishop of Cloyne and Ross

- Bishop of Cloyne and Ross
- Church: Catholic Church
- Diocese: Diocese of Cloyne and Ross
- In office: 9 August 1831 – 8 December 1832
- Predecessor: William Coppinger
- Successor: Bartholomew Crotty
- Previous post: Titular Bishop of Pegae (1827-1831)

Orders
- Consecration: 8 July 1827

Personal details
- Born: 1771 Rossmore, County Cork, Kingdom of Ireland, British Empire
- Died: December 8, 1832 (aged 60–61)
- Education: Maynooth College; St Patrick's College, Carlow

Michael Collins (1771 – 1832) was Roman Catholic Bishop of Cloyne and Ross. He was born in Rossmore, County Cork. He was educated for the priesthood at Maynooth College joining the Physics class in 1798, however he was expelled for his support and publicly encouraging insubordination, of the Robert Emmet Rising and completed his clerical studies at St. Patrick's College, Carlow. He became Professor of Belles Lettres in Carlow.

He served as a priest of Castletownroche, and then in Skibbereen, where he lived until his death.

In 1827 he became co-adjutor bishop of cloyne and ross and in 1830 Bishop of Cloyne and Ross.

He died in 1832 and in the Cathedral of St. Patrick, Skibbereen, County Cork, there is a marble monument of Dr Collins.

Catholic Church titles
Preceded by William Coppinger	Bishop of Cloyne & Ross; 1830 - 1832	Succeeded by Bartholomew Crotty
