= Damián Nannini =

Roman Catholic bishop

Most Reverend Damián Nannini
- Bishop of San Miguel
- Archdiocese: Buenos Aires
- Diocese: San Miguel
- Appointed: 7 November 2018
- Predecessor: Sergio Alfredo Fenoy
- Successor: Incumbent

Orders
- Ordination: 15 December 1989 by Jorge Manuel López
- Consecration: 14 December 2018 by Archbishop Sergio Alfredo Fenoy

Personal details
- Born: Damián Gustavo Nannini; 15 September 1961 (age 65) Rosario, Argentina
- Denomination: Roman Catholic
- Education: Pontifical Biblical Institute

Bishop Damián Nannini is the current serving bishop of Roman Catholic Diocese of San Miguel, Argentina.

== Early life and education ==
Damián was born in Rosario on 15 September 1961. He completed his studies from Sagrado Corazón College of Rosario and San Carlos Borromeo Seminary in Rosario. He holds a licentiate in Sacred Scripture from the Pontifical Biblical Institute, Rome.

== Priesthood ==
Damián was ordained a priest on 15 December 1989 by Jorge Manuel López.

== Episcopate ==
Damián was elected and appointed bishop of San Miguel, Argentina on 7 November 2018 by Pope Francis.

== Publications ==
La guerra santa en el Antiguo Testamento

El exilio de Judá. Lectura teológica de una crisis histórica

Presentación de la Exhortación Apostólica Gaudete et Exsultate del Santo Padre Francisco sobre el llamado a la santidad en el mundo actual

La misericordia de Dios en la Biblia
