= Clontead More House =

- Location within island of Ireland

General information
- Status: Private home (no public access)
- Type: Country house
- Location: Clontead More, County Cork, Ireland
- Coordinates: 51°55′22″N 8°46′38″W
- Completed: Mid 19th century

Clontead More House is a country house in the townland of Clontead More, situated 2.3 km (1.4 mi) north-east of Coachford village. Building c. 1840, it is one of a number of such estate houses situated along the valley of the River Lee and its tributaries.

Clontead More House is listed by Cork County Council on the Record of Protected Structures. Its entry in the National Inventory of Architectural Heritage describes it as a detached three-bay, two-storey house, built c. 1840, having a front porch, two-storey extension on the southern side, and u-plan hipped slate roof with rendered chimney stacks. Two-storey outbuildings are arranged around a rear courtyard, one of which is a former barn. To the south-east is the remains of a red-brick walled garden.

The property was constructed after 1840. It is not depicted on the 1842 surveyed OS map, which was also used during the mid-nineteenth century Primary Valuation of Ireland (Griffith's Valuation). The Connacht and Munster Landed Estates Database states that it was "built after the publication of the first edition Ordnance Survey map", and the 1901 surveyed OS map depicts the property, but does not name it.

It was once the residence of the Gillman family. The Primary Valuation of Ireland (Griffith's Valuation) records Herbert Gillman as occupying c. 86 acres, consisting of a "house, offices and land". The buildings were valued at c. £14, the land at c. £50, and the immediate lessor was Edward Murphy. Gillman is interred in the chancel of Magourney Church, Coachford.

The Irish Tourist Association survey of 1944 refers to the property as 'Clontead House, Peake' and the former residence of Herbert Webb Gillman. He is described as having been a Barrister-at-law, member of the Royal Society of Antiquaries of Ireland, Council member of the Cork Historical and Archaeological Society (CHAS) and 'specialised in castles around the countryside'. Gillman was one of the early members of CHAS and is interred in the apse of Magourney Church.

Today, Clontead More House remains a private residence, and is not accessible to the public.
