= Gilla Áedha Ua Maigín =

Gilla Áedha Ua Maigín, Bishop of Cork, died 1172.

Sub anno 1172, the Annals of the Four Masters state that:

"Giolla Aedha O'Muidhin (of the family of Errew of Lough Con), Bishop of Cork, died. He was a man full of the grace of God, the tower of the virginity and wisdom of his time."

Lough Conn is located in what is now County Mayo.
