= William Coppinger (bishop) =

Irish Catholic bishop

- Bishop of Cloyne and Ross
- Church: Catholic Church
- Diocese: Diocese of Cloyne and Ross
- In office: 4 June 1791 – 9 August 1831
- Predecessor: Mathew McKenna
- Successor: Michael Collins
- Previous posts: Titular Bishop of Axiery (1788-1791); Coadjutor Bishop of Cloyne and Ross (1788-1791)

Orders
- Ordination: 1780
- Consecration: 28 September 1788

Personal details
- Born: 20 May 1753 Cork, County Cork, Kingdom of Ireland, British Empire
- Died: 9 August 1831 (aged 78)

Bishop William Coppinger (1753–1830) was an Irish Catholic priest, who served as Bishop of Cloyne and Ross, from 1791 until his death.

== Life ==
William Coppinger was born on 20 May 1753 in County Cork, the son of Stephen and Joanna Coppinger. Prohibited by the Penal Laws from obtaining a liberal education at home, he studied successfully on the continent. He considered a military career and applied for a commission in the French army, but dissuaded by some friends, decided instead to train for the priesthood at the Irish College, Paris. He was ordained in 1780.

Coppinger returned to Ireland becoming a curate at his home parish, and then parish priest first at Carrigaline, and then at Passage in County Cork. In 1786 Bishop Francis Moylan of Cork named Coppinger vicar-general of the diocese, and shortly thereafter arranged for Coppinger to be appointed coadjutor to Bishop Matthew McKenna of Cloyne. McKenna was not pleased that he had not been consulted. Coppinger was consecrated a bishop in 1788, and succeeded to the See in 1791.

As Bishop of Cloyne and Ross, Dr. Coppinger, served as a trustee of Maynooth College upon its establishment in 1795. He was a strong opponent of the Veto giving the crown a say in episcopal appointments. He opposed the Irish Rebellion of 1798, partly due to the anti-religion ethos of the French Revolution which inspired it, and partly because he believed that the government was attempting to provoke the people. With the failure of the French Expédition d'Irlande, Coppinger issued a pastoral letter in 1797 urging his clergy to offset "the suggestion of designing men" and "confound the malice of agitators".

He stood up for the rights of Catholics, in opposing the 1800 Act of Union, and tithes tenant farmers were forced to pay. Bishop Coppinger supported Daniel O'Connell's, Catholic Association, whose methods he approved of.

In September 1820, he attended the episcopal consecration of John England, first bishop of the Diocese of Charleston, South Carolina, in St. Finbar's church in Cork. Bishop Coppinger died on 9 August 1831.

== Publications ==
Dr. Coppinger was a noted author and translator and a publisher of papers and pamphlets.

- Imitation of Christ, translated by William Coppinger, (1795)
- Life of Nano Nagle, by William Coppinger, (1794)
- Monita pastoralia, by William Coppinger, (1821)

Catholic Church titles
Preceded by Matthew McKenna	Bishop of Cloyne & Ross; 1791 - 1830	Succeeded by Michael Collins
