= Clontead More =

Townland in County Cork, Ireland

Clontead More Cluain Téide Mhór
- Townland
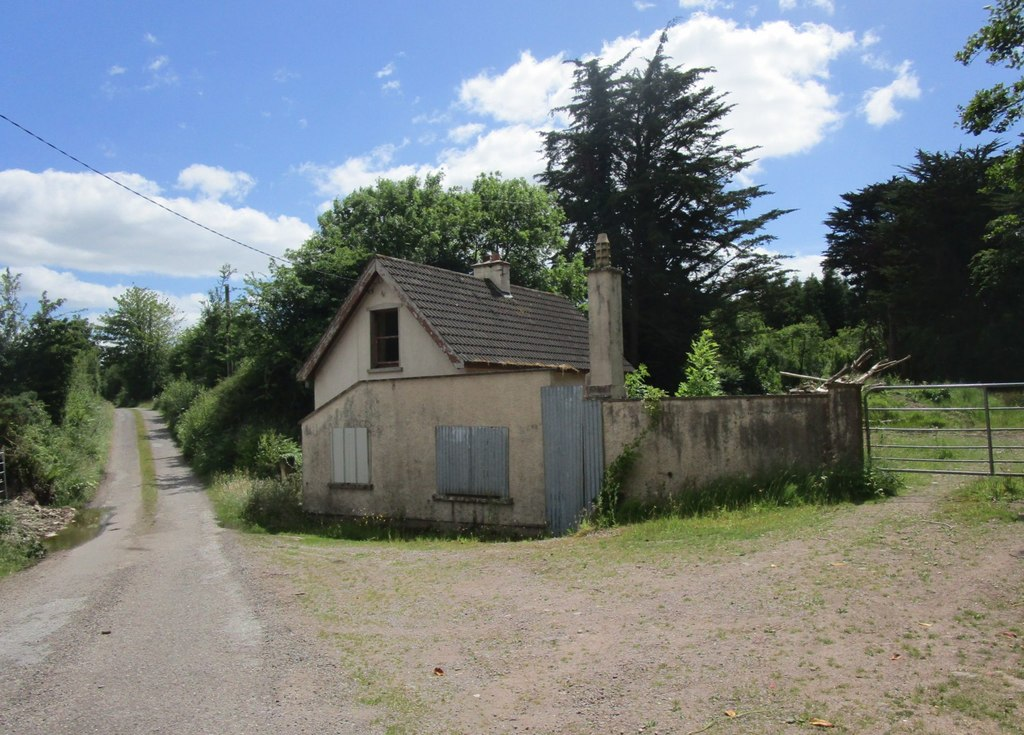
- Derelict cottage, near the former Cork and Muskerry Light Railway line, north of Coachford

- Location within Ireland
- Coordinates: 51°54′46″N 8°47′15″W
- Country: Ireland
- County: County Cork
- Barony: Muskerry East
- Civil parish: Magourney
- Settlements: Coachford

Clontead More (Irish: Cluain Téide Mhór) is a townland in the civil parish of Magourney and historical barony of Muskerry East in County Cork, Ireland. The townland, which is approximately 1.3 square kilometres (0.5 sq mi) in area, had a population of 75 people as of the 2011 census. Overlapping with the nearby village of Coachford, it adjoins the townlands of Clontead Beg to the south and Carrignamuck to the east.

== Built heritage ==
There is a standing stone in the townland, approximately 0.46 km (0.29 mi) north of Coachford. An Irish Tourist Association survey of 1944 describes it as a 'dolmen' on a farm, 0.5 miles from the village. Consisting of a single boulder of c. 3 ton in weight and lying flat in the corner of a field, it was alleged to have been thrown by the giant Mushera from his lair on Mushera Mountain. The 'marks of his fingers' were said to be still visible. In the Archaeological Inventory of County Cork (1997), it is described as being on a south facing slope, in pasture, sub-rectangular in plan, with a height of 1.12m and long axis NE-SW.

Also within the townland is Clontead More House, a mid-19th century house which is included in the Record of Protected Structures for County Cork.
