= Bartholomew Crotty =

Irish priest and bishop, President of Maynooth College 1813-1832

- Bishop of Cloyne and Ross
- Church: Catholic Church
- Diocese: Diocese of Cloyne and Ross
- In office: 22 March 1833 – 3 October 1846
- Predecessor: Michael Collins
- Successor: David Walsh

Orders
- Ordination: 1792
- Consecration: 11 June 1833 by Daniel Murray

Personal details
- Born: 1769 Clonakilty, County Cork, Kingdom of Ireland, British Empire
- Died: 3 October 1846 (aged 76–77)

Bartholomew Crotty (1769–1846) was an Irish Catholic priest and Bishop of Cloyne, who served as Rector of the Irish College at Lisbon from 1799 to 1811 and later President of Maynooth College from 1813 until 1832.

== Life ==
Crotty was born in 1769 in Clonakilty, County Cork, and was one of the first students of attend the re-established Irish College in Lisbon, Portugal. He then served on the staff of the college for almost 20 years. He was ordained to the priesthood in 1792. In 1799, he succeeded Dr. Michael Brady as rector of the College. In 1811 he returned to Ireland to Cloyne, and two years later was appointed President of St Patrick's College, Maynooth.

In 1833 he was appointed to succeed Michael Collins as Bishop of Cloyne and Ross. In 1837, Crotty persuaded Catherine McAuley to establish a house of the Sisters of Mercy in the diocese. Four years later, the seventy-two year old Bishop traveled forty miles to meet with the foundation in Charleville. When McAuley expressed regret that he had taken so much trouble, Crotty responded that as they did not decline travelling from Dublin to his charge, he could not avoid coming to meet them.

Crotty served until his death on 3 October 1846. He bequeathed his Library to St. Patrick's College, Maynooth on his death. He is buried at the Presentation Convent, Midleton, County Cork.

Catholic Church titles
Preceded by Michael Collins	Bishop of Cloyne & Ross; 1833 - 1846	Succeeded by David Walsh
