= Clontead Beg =

- Townland

Irish transcription(s)
  - Derivation: Cluain Téide Bheag
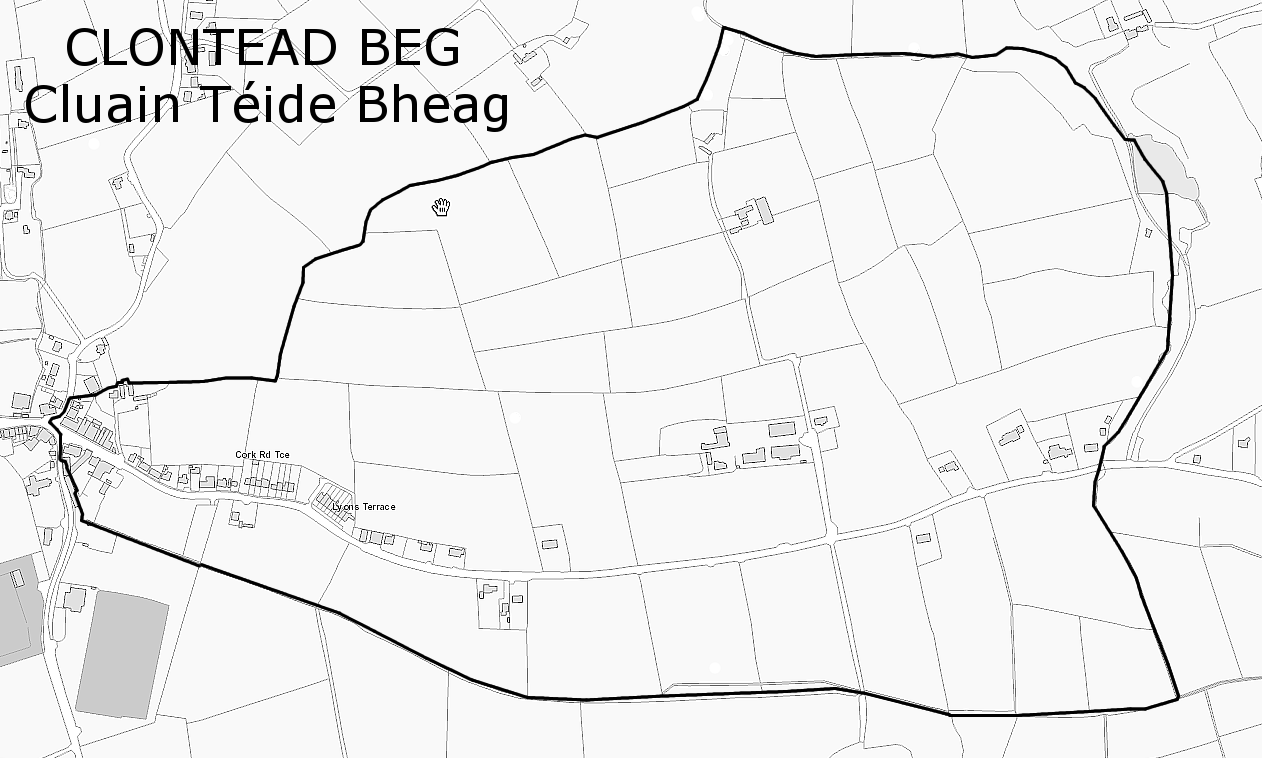

- Clontead Beg shown within Ireland
- Coordinates: 51°54′37″N 8°46′30″W
- Country: Ireland
- County: County Cork
- Barony: Muskerry East
- Civil parish: Magourney
- Settlements: Coachford

Government
  - Council: Cork County Council
  - Ward: Blarney-Macroom EA

Area
  - Total: 92.71 ha (229.1 acres)
- Irish grid reference: W466733

Clontead Beg (from Irish Cluain Téide Bheag) is a townland within the civil parish of Magourney and Catholic parish of Aghabullogue, County Cork, Ireland. It is approximately 229 acres in size, and east of Coachford village.

In the Down Survey (Muskery Map, 1656-8), it is referred to as 'Clonete Beg', but does not appear as a 'denomination' on the Down Survey parish map, nor is it mentioned in the accompanying terrier.

The Ordnance Survey name book (c. 1840) describes the western end of the townland as forming the village of Coachford and the eastern end the 'Derreen Demesne'. Variations of the placename include 'Clontade', 'Clontead', 'Clontadebeg' and 'Clontade Beg'. A suggested Irish version is Cluain Téide Beg, with 'Cluain Téide' interpreted as 'plain or lawn of the green [hill]'. O'Murchú (1991) gives an Irish version of Cluain Téide, suggesting 'Téide' as meaning a plateau, or a plain on a hill; essentially 'plain of the flat-topped hill'. The Placenames Database of Ireland gives the townland an Irish name of Cluain Téide Bheag, with 'Cluain' meaning 'meadow' or 'pasture'.

Townland population
Year	Pop.
1841	129
1851	57
1861	114
1871	90
1881	54
1891	24
1901	38
1911	61

Earlier versions of townland name
Year	Form
1656-8	Clonete Beg (Down Survey)
1811	Clunnteady (Bath's Grand Jury map)
1840	Clontade/Clontead/Clontadebeg/Clontade Beg (OS name book)
1842	Clontead Beg (1842 surveyed OS map)

== See also ==
- Clontead More
