= Sunday's Well =

Sunday's Well Tobar Rí an Domhnaigh
- Suburb
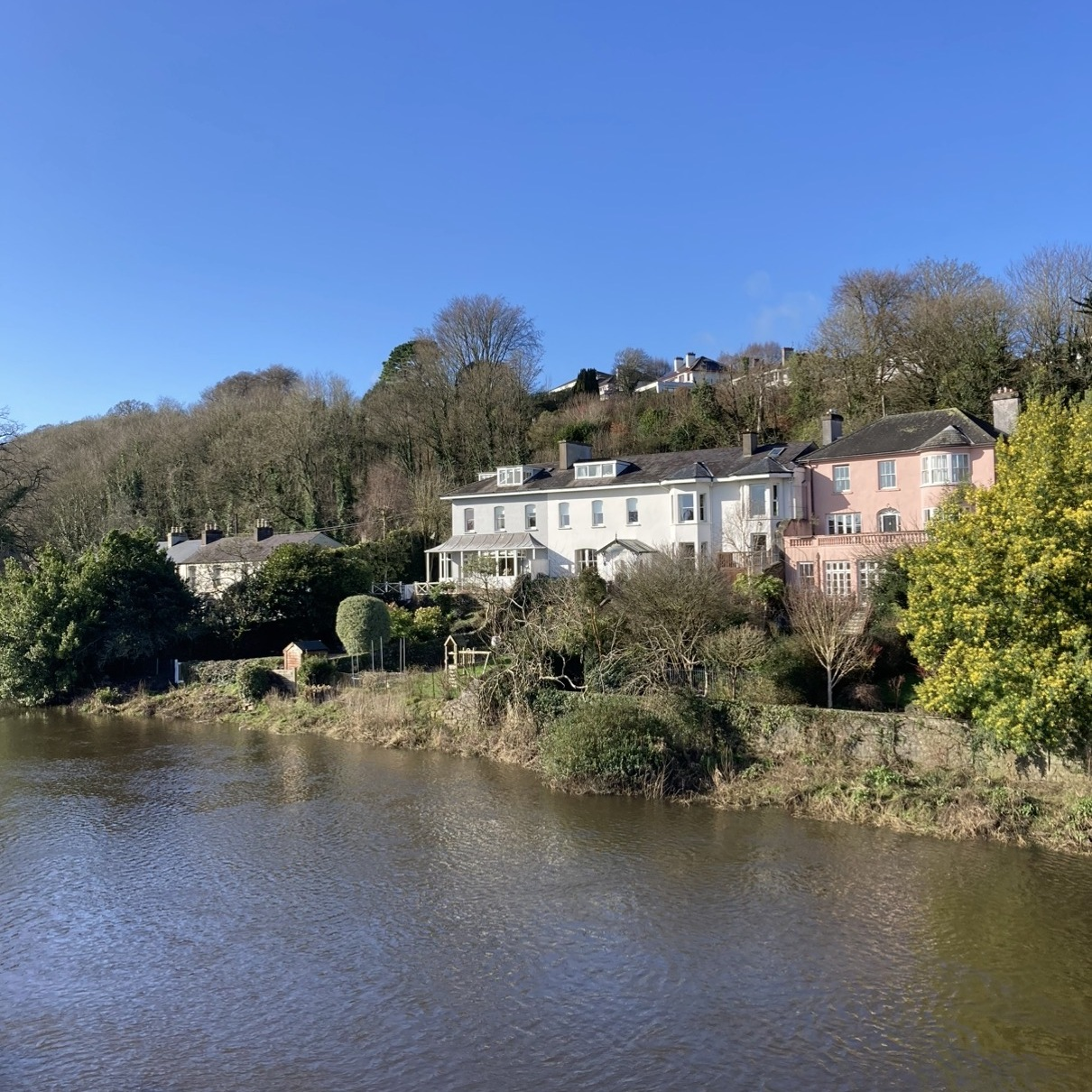
- Houses in Sunday's Well

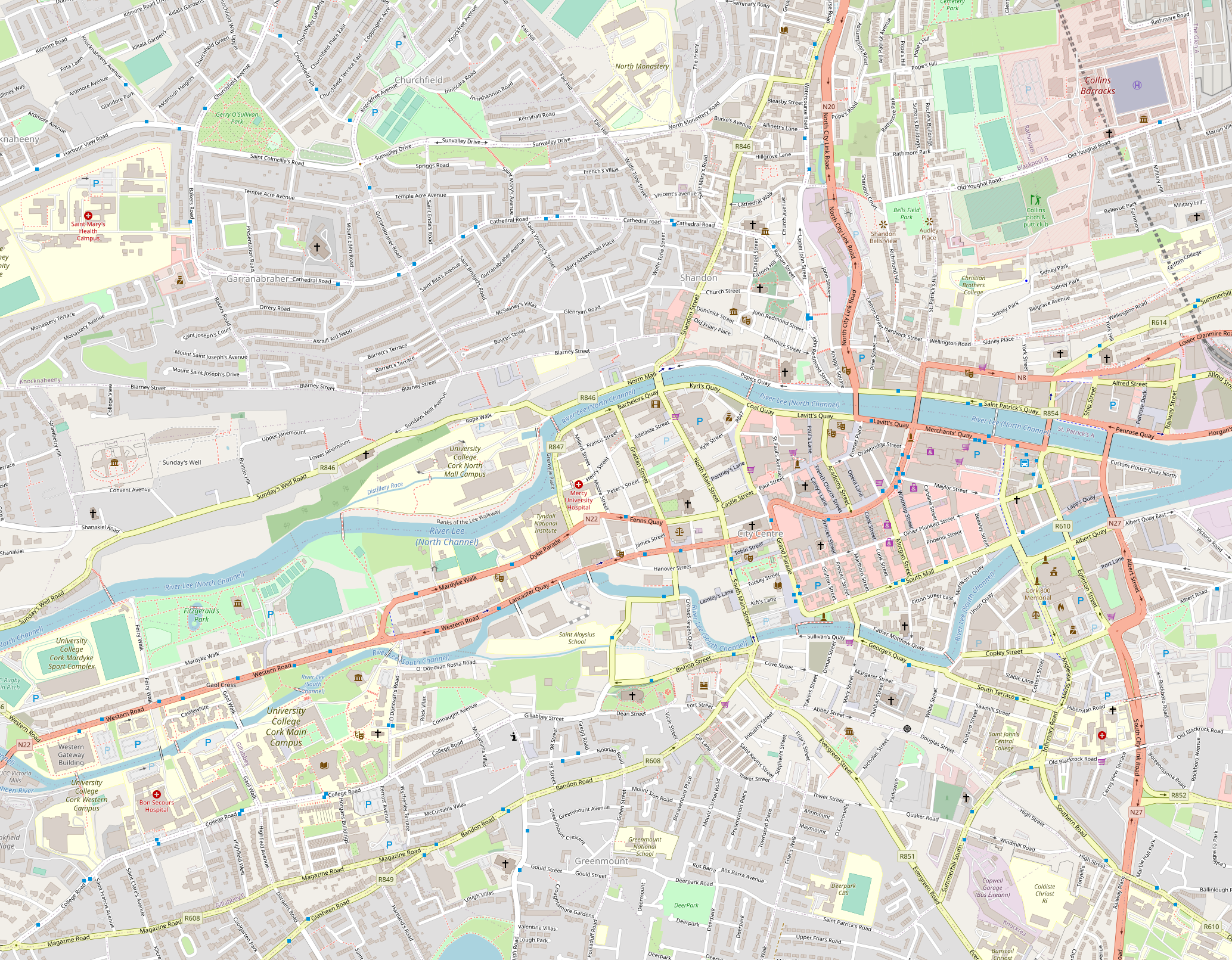
- Location within Cork Central Location within County Cork Location within Ireland
- Coordinates: 51.8978146°N 8.4993317°W
- Country: Ireland
- Province: Munster
- County: County Cork
- City: Cork
- Local authority: Cork City Council

Government
  - Dáil constituency: Cork North-Central
- Eircode routing key: T23
- Telephone area code: +353 (0)21

Sunday's Well (Irish: Tobar Rí an Domhnaigh, meaning 'Well of the King of Sunday') is a suburb of Cork city in Ireland. It is situated in the north-west of the city, on a ridge on the northern bank of the River Lee. Sunday's Well is part of the Dáil constituency of Cork North-Central, and Cork City Council's Cork City North West local electoral area.

The area's former 19th century Catholic church, St. Vincent's Church, was previously associated with the Vincentian Fathers and deconsecrated in 2018. The local GAA club is also named St Vincent's. Rugby union club Sundays Well RFC was formed in the area in 1906, before moving to Musgrave Park on the southside of the city in the 1940s. Sundays Well Boating and Tennis Club, established in 1899, is also based nearby in Mardyke Walk.

Notable residents of the area have included journalist Matt Cooper and Irish Labour Party leader Ivana Bacik.
