= Francis Moylan =

Roman Catholic Bishop of Cork, Ireland

- Bishop of Cork
- Church: Catholic Church
- Diocese: Diocese of Cork
- In office: 19 June 1787 – 10 February 1815
- Predecessor: John Butler
- Successor: John Murphy
- Previous post: Bishop of Ardfert and Aghadoe (1775-1787)

Orders
- Ordination: 11 June 1761

Personal details
- Born: 17 September 1735 Douglas, Cork, County Cork, Kingdom of Ireland, British Empire
- Died: 10 February 1815 (aged 79)

Francis Moylan (1735–1815) was the Roman Catholic Bishop of Cork, having first served as Bishop of Bishop of Ardfert and Aghadoe in Kerry.

== Life ==
He was born on 17 September 1735 in Cork, Ireland, second son of John Moylan, a well-to-do merchant of Shandon. He was educated at Paris, at Montpellier, and afterwards at the Irish College in Toulouse, where he studied theology, and became acquainted with Henry Essex Edgeworth, then a boy, living there with his father. Edgeworth and Moylan became lifelong friends.

On his ordination to the priesthood in 1761, Moylan was appointed to a curacy at Chatou, a relatively affluent suburb of Paris, by the archbishop, Christophe de Beaumont, and for a time served as his secretary. Returning to Cork he worked in the North Parish. In 1771, he helped Nano Nagle introduce the Ursulines to Cork. Three years later, he was transferred to the Parish of St. Finbarr, in Dunbar Street in the South Parish, known as "the South Chapel", not far from Cove Lane, where in 1775 Nagle founded the first convent of the Presentation Sisters.

In April 1775, he was consecrated Bishop of Ardfert and Aghadoe, and translated in 1787 to Cork, to fill the vacancy caused by the defection of Lord Dunboyne. His appointment was supported by a petition signed by members of the regular clergy of Cork. Moylan was a close friend of Lord Kenmare, a highly influential Catholic peer, who led the movement to repeal penal legislation in the House of Lords. Kenmare was very involved in the Catholic Committee, which saw the passage of the Papists Act 1778, which repealed a number of provisions of the Popery Act 1698. Moylan had no sympathy with violence as a means of redressing wrong, and therefore condemned the Whiteboys

When the French fleet appeared off the south coast of Ireland in 1796, Moylan issued a pastoral letter to his flock urging them to loyalty; his native city, in recognition of his attitude, presented him with its freedom, an unusual mark of esteem to be bestowed on a catholic in those days. The lord-lieutenant (Earl Camden) ordered one of his pastorals to be circulated throughout the kingdom, and Pelham, the chief secretary for Ireland, wrote to congratulate Moylan on his conduct.

In 1799, Lord Castlereagh suggested to ten of the Irish bishops, who formed a board for examining into the affairs of Maynooth College, that the government would recommend catholic emancipation if the bishops in return admitted the king to have a power of veto on all future ecclesiastical appointments, and if they accepted a state endowment for the catholic clergy. The prelates, Moylan chief among them, were disposed to adopt these proposals in a modified form, but subsequently, on learning Lord Castlereagh's full intentions, repudiated them. Moylan afterwards vigorously deprecated 'any interference whatsoever' of the government in the appointment of the bishops or clergy, and took a leading part in the great 'veto' controversy.

Moylan was in favour of the legislative union of Ireland with Great Britain. He took an active part in the establishment of Maynooth College, and had some correspondence on the subject with Edmund Burke. He was a most successful administrator of his diocese, and helped materially in the establishment of the Presentation order of nuns founded by Nano Nagle for the education of poor girls.

The Duke of Portland, whom he visited at Bulstrode Park, writing of him said :

There can be, and there never has been, but one opinion of the firmness, the steadiness, and the manliness of Dr. Moylan's character, which, it was agreed by all those who had the pleasure of meeting him here [Bulstrode], was as engaging as his person, which avows and bespeaks as much goodwill as can be well imagined in a human countenance.

He died on 10 February 1815, and was buried in a vault in his cathedral.

== Sources ==
- Hutch, Life of Nano Nagle (Dublin, 1875)
