= Bishop of Cork and Ross =

Episcopal title of Ireland

The bishop of Cork and Ross is an episcopal title which takes its name after the city of Cork and the County Cork town of Rosscarbery in the Republic of Ireland. The combined title was first used by the Church of Ireland from 1638 to 1660 and again from 1679 to 1835. At present the title is being used by the Roman Catholic Church.

== Church of Ireland bishops ==
The Church of Ireland title was formed when the bishopric of Cork, Cloyne and Ross was separated in 1638 into bishopric of Cork and Ross and the bishopric of Cloyne. They were reunited in 1660, but again were separated in 1679. Since 1835, the sees of Cork, Cloyne and Ross have again been reunited under one bishop.

List of Church of Ireland Bishops of Cork and Ross
From	Until	Incumbent	Notes
1638	1649	William Chappell	Nominated 30 August 1638; consecrated 11 November 1638; died 13 May 1649
1649	1660	See vacant	
1660	1679	See was part of the united the bishopric of Cork, Cloyne and Ross.	
1679	1699	Edward Wetenhall	Nominated 3 February 1679; consecrated 23 March 1679; translated to Kilmore and Ardagh 18 April 1699
1699	1709	Dive Downes	Nominated 3 March 1699; consecrated 4 June 1699; died 13 November 1709.
1709	1735	Peter Browne	Nominated 26 December 1709; consecrated 8 April 1710; died 25 August 1735
1735	1745	Robert Clayton	Translated from Killala; nominated 22 November 1735; letters patent 19 December 1735; translated to Clogher 26 August 1745
1745	1772	Jemmett Browne	Translated from Dromore; nominated 3 August 1745; letters patent 27 August 1745; translated to Elphin 6 March 1772
1772	1788	Isaac Mann	Nominated 27 January 1772; consecrated 15 March 1772; died 10 December 1788
1789	1789	Euseby Cleaver	Translated from Dromore; nominated 21 March 1789; consecrated 28 March 1789; translated to Ferns 13 June 1789
1789	1790	William Foster	Nominated 5 June 1789; consecrated 14 June 1789; translated to Kilmore 11 June 1790
1790	1794	William Bennet	Nominated 7 May 1790; consecrated 13 June 1790; translated to Cloyne 27 June 1794
1794	1805	Hon.Thomas Stopford	Nominated 20 May 1794; consecrated 29 June 1794; died 24 January 1805
1805	1807	Lord John Beresford	Nominated 13 February 1805; consecrated 29 March 1805; translated to Raphoe 10 August 1807
1807	1831	Hon. Thomas St Lawrence	Nominated 3 September 1807; consecrated 27 September 1807; died 10 February 1831.
1831	1835	Samuel Kyle	Nominated 3 March 1831; consecrated 27 March 1831; became Bishop of Cork, Cloyne and Ross 14 September 1835; died 18 May 1848;
Since 1835, the see has again been part of the united diocese of Cork, Cloyne and Ross.

== Roman Catholic bishops ==
The Roman Catholic title was formed by the union of the bishoprics of Cork and Ross on 19 April 1958.

The current bishop is the Most Reverend Fintan Gavin, Bishop of the Roman Catholic Diocese of Cork and Ross who was appointed by the Holy See on 8 April 2019 and was installed at the Cathedral of St Mary and St Anne, Cork, on 30 June 2019.

List of Roman Catholic Bishops of Cork and Ross
From	Until	Incumbent	Notes
1958	1980	Cornelius Lucey	Appointed Bishop of Cork in 1952 and Apostolic Administrator of Ross in 1954; became bishop of the united diocese of Cork and Ross on 19 April 1958; resigned 23 August 1980; died 24 September 1982
1980	1996	Michael Murphy	Appointed coadjutor bishop of Cork and Ross 1 April 1976; ordained bishop 23 May 1976; succeeded 23 August 1980; died 7 October 1996
1997	2019	John Buckley	Appointed auxiliary bishop of Cork and Ross 16 March 1984; ordained bishop 29 April 1984; succeeded 19 December 1997; retired 30 June 2019
2019	present	Fintan Gavin	Appointed bishop of Cork and Ross 8 April 2019; ordained bishop 30 June 2019;

== See also ==
- Saint Finbarre's Cathedral, Cork (Church of Ireland)
- Saint Fachtna's Cathedral, Ross (Church of Ireland)
