= Diocese of San Miguel (Argentina) =

Roman Catholic diocese in Argentina

Diocese of San Miguel in Argentina Dioecesis Sancti Michaëlis in Argentina Diócesis de San Miguel

Catholic
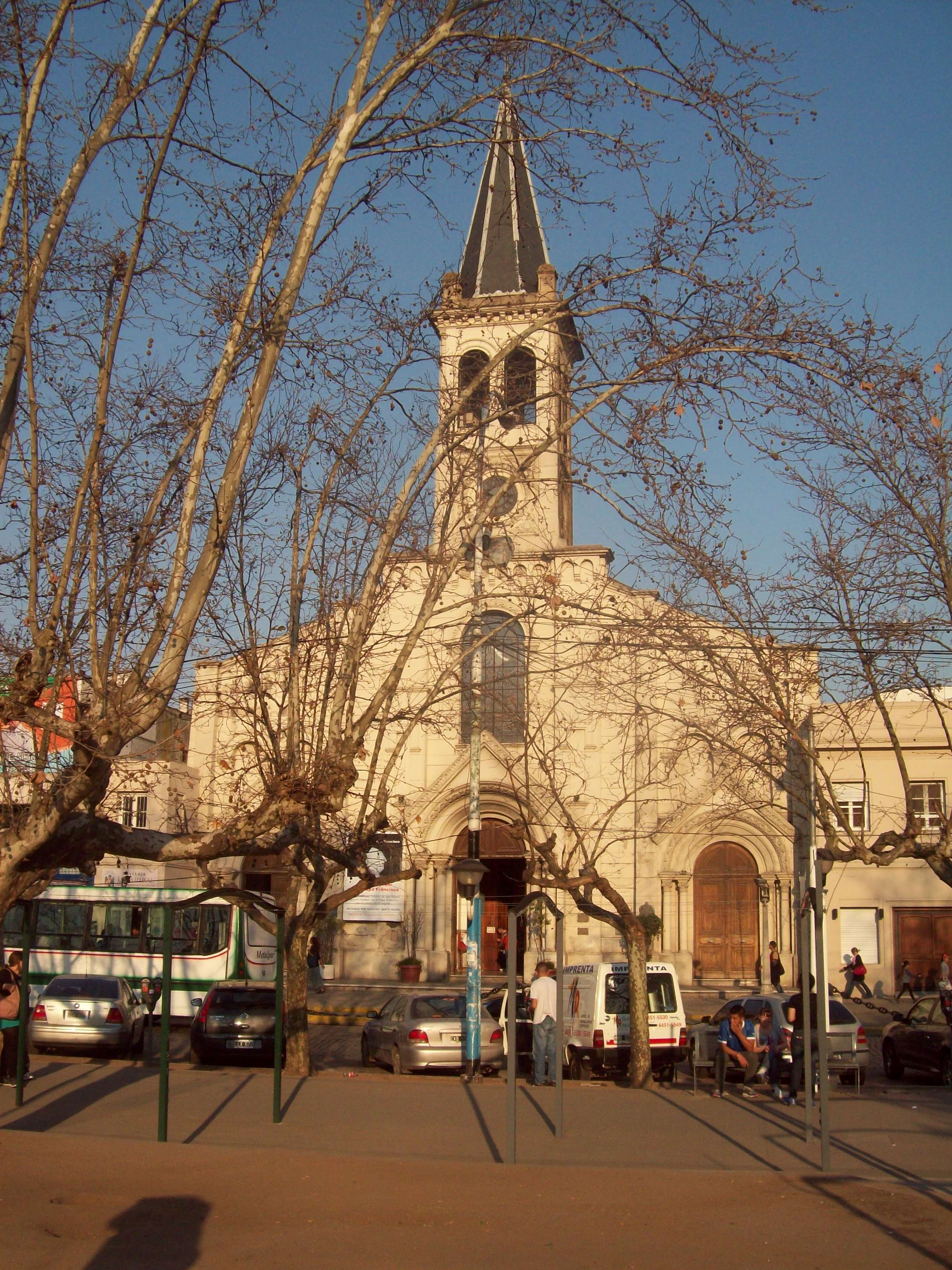
- Cathedral of St Michael

Location
- Country: Argentina
- Ecclesiastical province: Buenos Aires
- Metropolitan: Buenos Aires

Statistics
- Area: 206 km^{2} (80 sq mi)
- Population: Total; Catholics: (as of 2010); 986,000; 852,000 (86.4%)
- Parishes: 27

Information
- Denomination: Roman Catholic
- Rite: Roman Rite
- Established: 11 July 1978 (48 years ago)
- Cathedral: Cathedral of St Michael the Archangel in San Miguel
- Patron saint: St Michael the Archangel; Our Lady of Luján

Current leadership
- Pope: Leo XIV
- Bishop: Damián Nannini
- Metropolitan Archbishop: Jorge Ignacio García Cuerva

Website
- Website of the Diocese

The Roman Catholic Diocese of San Miguel is a suffragan diocese of the Buenos Aires. It was established by Pope Paul VI on 11 July 1978.

== Bishops ==
=== Ordinaries ===
- Horacio Alberto Bózzoli (1978–1983), appointed Archbishop of Tucumán
- José Manuel Lorenzo (1983–1994)
- Abelardo Francisco Silva (1994–2000)
- José Luis Mollaghan (2000–2005), appointed Archbishop of Rosario
- Sergio Alfredo Fenoy (2006–2018), appointed Archbishop of Santa Fe de la Vera Cruz
- Damián Nannini (2018–present)

=== Coadjutor bishop ===
- Abelardo Francisco Silva (1994)

=== Another priest of this diocese who became bishop ===
- Nicolás Baisi, appointed Auxiliary Bishop of La Plata in 2010
