= Cathedral of St Mary and St Anne =

- North Cathedral / North Chapel / St Mary's Cathedral
- Ardeaglais Naomh Muire agus Naomh Áine
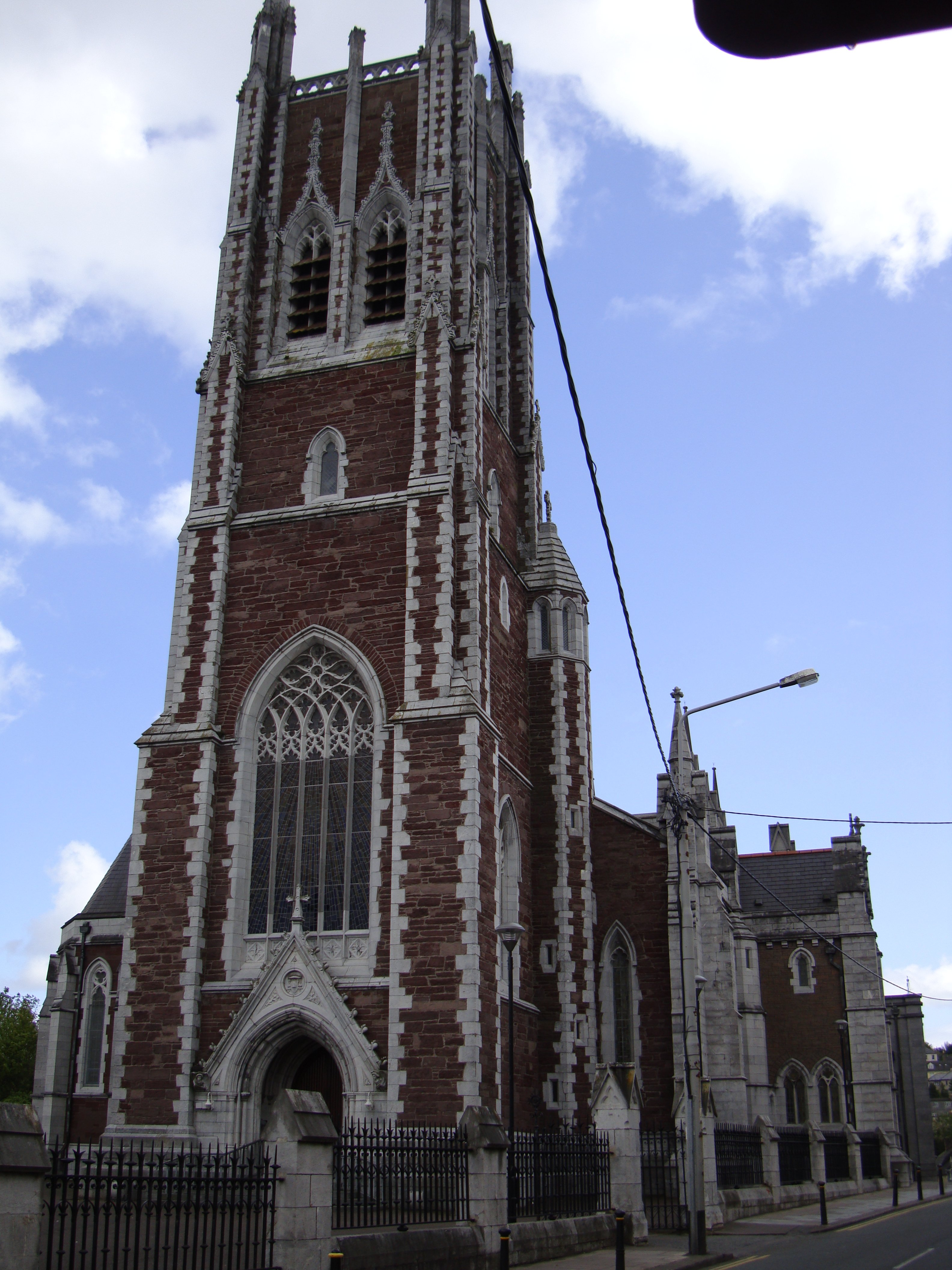

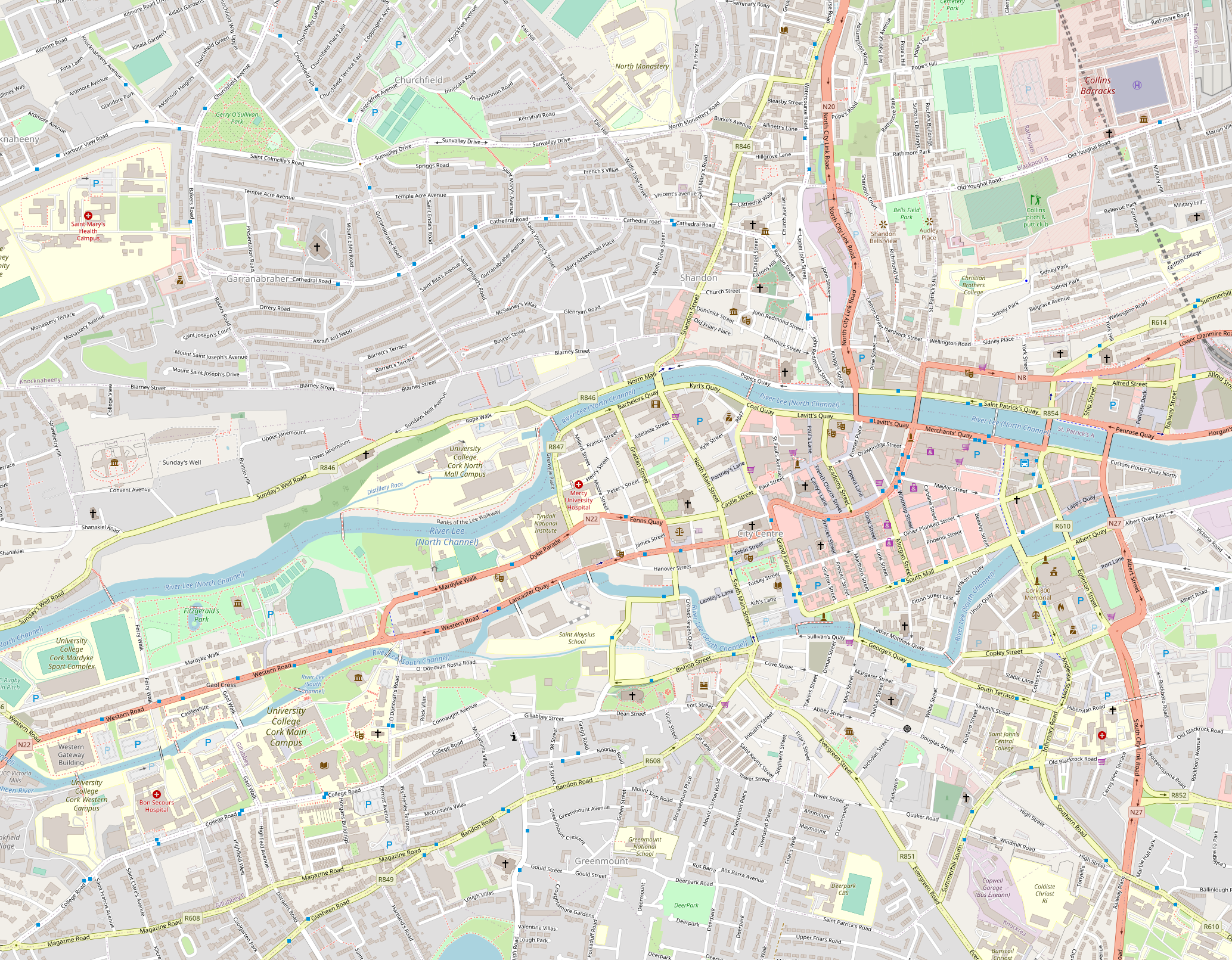
- Location within Cork Central
- 51°54′17″N 8°28′34″W
- Location: Cork, County Cork
- Country: Ireland
- Denomination: Roman Catholic
- Website: https://corkcathedralfop.ie/parishes/the-cathedral

History
- Status: In Use
- Consecrated: 22 August 1808

Architecture
- Architect: John Benson
- Style: Neo Gothic
- Completed: 1869 (tower)

Administration
- Archdiocese: Cashel and Emly
- Diocese: Cork and Ross
- Parish: Cathedral

Clergy
- Bishop: Fintan Gavin

The Cathedral of Saint Mary and Saint Anne (Irish: Ardeaglais Naomh Muire agus Naomh Áine), also known as Saint Mary's Cathedral, The North Cathedral or The North Chapel, (Note: The term "North Chapel" historically distinguished the church of Saint Mary and Saint Anne (on Cork's northside) from the church of Saint Finbarr (the "South Chapel" on the opposite side of the River Lee)) is a Roman Catholic cathedral located at the top of Shandon Street in Cork, Ireland. It is the seat of the Bishop of Cork and Ross, and the mother church of the Roman Catholic Diocese of Cork and Ross. Its name derived from the fact that it encompassed the ecclesiastical parish of St. Mary and the civil parish of St. Anne.

== History ==
Saint Mary's and St Anne's Cathedral is both the seat of the Bishop of Cork and Ross, and the parish church for the Cathedral parish which includes the areas of Blarney Street, Shandon and Blackpool. Baptismal records date back to 1731. The parish boundary had also included the areas of Blackpool and Clogheen/Kerry Pike until 1981. (Both chapels of ease to the cathedral, The Church of the Most Precious Blood, became the parish church of Clogheen/Kerry Pike, while the Church of the Annunciation, became the parish church of Blackpool). The Vincentian Parish of Sunday's Well, also erected in 1981, returned to the Cathedral parish following the closure of St Vincent's Church in 2016.

The cathedral was built during the tenure of Bishop Francis Moylan. Construction began in 1799 on the site of a former church built in the 1730s. The cathedral was dedicated on 22 August 1808 by Archbishop Thomas Bray of Cashel. In his sermon, coadjutor bishop Florence McCarthy D.D. spoke of the "necessity of social worship, arguing the point from reason, scripture, and tradition." McCarthy died of typhoid in 1810, contracted while visiting a sick parishioner.

The building was extensively damaged by an act of arson in 1820. George Richard Pain undertook the restoration of the cathedral, enlarging the sanctuary and creating a Chancel Arch. The cathedral re-opened in 1828.

Beginning in January 1965 at the request of Bishop Cornelius Lucey, the cathedral was extended, a sanctuary tower and new sanctuary were added along with a mortuary chapel, basement and sacristy area. The internal layout was stripped, simplified and reorganised following the directives of the Second Vatican Council. These works were completed by 1968. The architects employed were Boyd Barrett and Associates.

The most recent large-scale works were completed at the cathedral between 1994 and 1996. The tower and sanctuary were renovated and refurbished, and the high altar, altar rails and side altars were removed. Confessionals in the nave were also removed to make way for shrines. The roof was re-slated and the gothic ceiling was repaired. External stonework of the cathedral was also repointed. The cathedral closed for the duration of the works while the parish masses took place in the nearby convents. The present altar, ambo and tabernacle are the work of Tom Glendon. The wooden carving of St Joseph the Worker, the shrine of Blessed Thaddeus McCarthy, and the processional cross are the work of Cork-based artist, Ken Thompson. The abstract stained glass windows in the Blessed Sacrament chapel are the work of James Scanlon. The contemporary artwork collection in the lady chapel is the work of Irish artist, Patrick Pye.

The cathedral was re-opened and re-dedicated by Bishop Michael Murphy on 29 September 1996 (shortly before his death in October 1996).

The cathedral's bicentenary was celebrated in September 2008.

In 2017, a visitor centre was established underneath the sanctuary of the cathedral, with tours of the Cork Folklore Project's exhibition and work.

== Architecture ==
Designed in early Neo-Gothic Revivalist style, the building combines sandstone with limestone dressings. The tower over the main door was added in 1869, designed by John Benson.

The original altar was fashioned in wood by Italian craftsmen in Lisbon. In 1821, John Hogan carved twenty-seven statues in wood for the reredos behind the high altar. Hidden away in the 1960s and thought to be lost, these statues were rediscovered in the 1990s and placed in the blind clerestory of the nave.

The nine bells of Benson's tower were cast in 1870 by John Murphy of Dublin, and were initially hung for change-ringing. The bells gradually fell into disrepair and by 1966 only one bell remained working. Sometime later this bell also stopped working, and were described in 2010 as 'unringable'. The bells were fully restored in December 2022.

The modern interior of 1996 was designed by architect Richard Hurley & Associates, and is finished in white limestone.
