= Cornelius Lucey =

Roman Catholic bishop

- Bishop of Cork and Ross
- Church: Catholic Church
- Diocese: Diocese of Cork and Ross
- In office: 24 August 1952 – 23 August 1980
- Predecessor: Daniel Cohalan (Cork); Denis Moynihan (Ross)
- Successor: John Buckley
- Previous posts: Titular Bishop of Sila (1950-1952); Coadjutor Bishop of Cork (1950-1952)

Orders
- Ordination: 19 June 1927
- Consecration: 14 January 1951 by Daniel Cohalan

Personal details
- Born: 15 July 1902 Ovens, County Cork, United Kingdom of Great Britain and Ireland
- Died: 24 September 1982 (aged 80) Cork, County Cork, Republic of Ireland

Cornelius "Con" Lucey (15 July 1902 – 24 September 1982) was a Roman Catholic bishop of Cork and Ross.

== Youth and education ==
Cornelius Lucey was born 15 July 1902 into a farming family at Windsor, Ovens, County Cork near Cork City. He attended Ballinora Primary School and played for the local GAA club. He studied at St Finbarr's College, Farranferris, the diocesan college. He graduated from St Patrick's College, Maynooth with BC and BCL, and obtained MAs at Innsbruck University in 1927–29 and then University College Dublin from 1929 to 1930.

== Priestly ministry ==
Lucey was ordained a priest in 1927.

He held the chair of philosophy and political theory at St. Patrick's College, Maynooth from 1929 to 1950. Alongside Peter McKevitt, he was one of the founders of Christus Rex, a priestly society devoted to social issues, on which he was a prominent commentator.

== Episcopal ministry ==
In November 1950 Lucey was appointed titular bishop of Sila and auxiliary bishop of Cork with right of succession, and was consecrated bishop the following January. Upon the death of Bishop Cohalan, in August 1952, Lucey became Bishop of Cork.

In 1958 the Diocese of Ross united with the Diocese of Cork. Shortly after his appointment as Bishop of Cork And Ross, Lucey embarked on a plan to build five new churches in the rapidly developing suburbs of Cork. The five new churches were named after the five Glorious Mysteries of the Rosary. During his tenure, he founded a total of thirteen churches in Cork.

He founded the St. Anne's Adoption Society in 1954. His outspoken sermons, often given at confirmations, made him something of a thorn in the side of the establishment. His views on matters of faith and morals were conservative, and he was involved in a controversy in the 1960s, when he withdrew the diocesan faculties of Father James Good, a lecturer at University College, Cork, for publicly dissenting from the teaching of Pope Paul VI.

In 1965 Bishop Lucey started the Cork diocesan mission to Peru, where many priests from Cork ministered. The last of the Irish missioners returned from La Esperanza to Ireland in 2004.

== African Ministry in Retirement ==
Lucey retired as bishop in 1980. He went to the Turkana District in Kenya to work as an ordinary curate with Fr. James Good, who had gone there some years earlier. Good later described the last two years of the Bishop's life and his reaction to Turkana customs:

The parish priest of Lorogumu was an advanced liturgist and (among other things) had introduced general absolution along with an entrance rite to Sunday Mass in which six ladies clad (or unclad) à la Turkana custom danced to the altar before the priest. I panicked but Bishop Lucey got his way and was duly installed as curate in Lorogumu, under Fr Tony Barrett, a Kiltegan priest who was an expert in Turkana language and custom. It was a perfect combination: one might describe it as a perfect marriage of minds and of mutual admiration. At a later date I asked Bishop Lucey how he liked the Lorogumu liturgy and he replied 'very beautiful'.

== Death and legacy ==
After nearly two years in Kenya he became seriously ill. He was flown back to Cork in May 1982, and was diagnosed with leukaemia. He died on 24 September 1982 at Bon Secours Hospital, Cork.

In 1985, as part of the Cork 800 festival, a site between Grand Parade and South Main Street was developed into an urban park named "Bishop Lucey Park".

== See also ==
- Alumni of St Patrick's Pontifical University, Maynooth
- Peter McKevitt

Catholic Church titles
Preceded by Daniel Cohalan (Cork); Denis Moynihan (Ross)	Bishop of Cork and Ross; 1980–1996	Succeeded by John Buckley
