= Roman Catholic Diocese of Cork and Ross =

Catholic diocese in Ireland

Coordinates: 51°54′16″N 8°28′34″W

Diocese of Cork and Ross Dioecesis Corcagiensis et Rossensis Deoise Chorcaí agus Rosa

Catholic
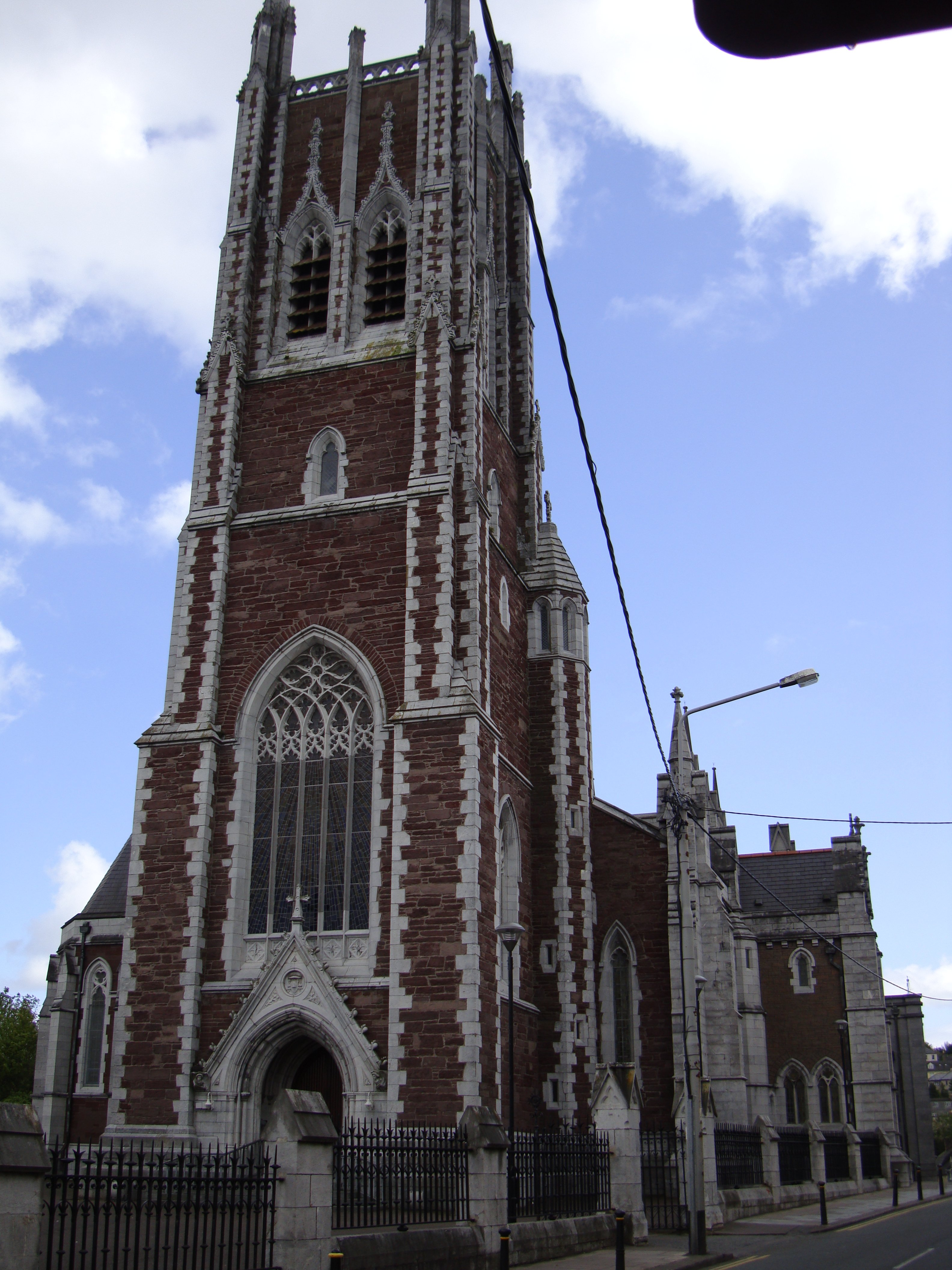
- Cathedral of St Mary and St Anne, Cork

Location
- Country: Ireland
- Territory: Cork city and part of County Cork
- Ecclesiastical province: Cashel and Emly
- Metropolitan: Cashel and Emly

Statistics
- Area: 3,342 km^{2} (1,290 sq mi)
- Population: Total; Catholics: (as of 2021); 267,000; 222,670 (83.0%)
- Parishes: 67

Information
- Denomination: Catholic
- Sui iuris church: Latin Church
- Rite: Roman Rite
- Established: 1111 (as Diocese of Cork); 19 April 1958 (as Diocese of Cork and Ross)
- Cathedral: St Mary and St Anne, Cork
- Co-cathedral: St Patrick's, Skibbereen
- Patron saint: Cork: Finbarr; Ross: Fachtna
- Secular priests: 107 (as of 2021)

Current leadership
- Pope: Leo XIV
- Bishop: Fintan Gavin, Bishop of Cork and Ross
- Metropolitan Archbishop: Kieran O'Reilly, Archbishop of Cashel and Emly
- Vicar General: Fr. Tom Hayes; Mgr. Aidan O'Driscoll
- Bishops emeritus: John Buckley, Bishop of Cork and Ross

Website
- corkandross.org

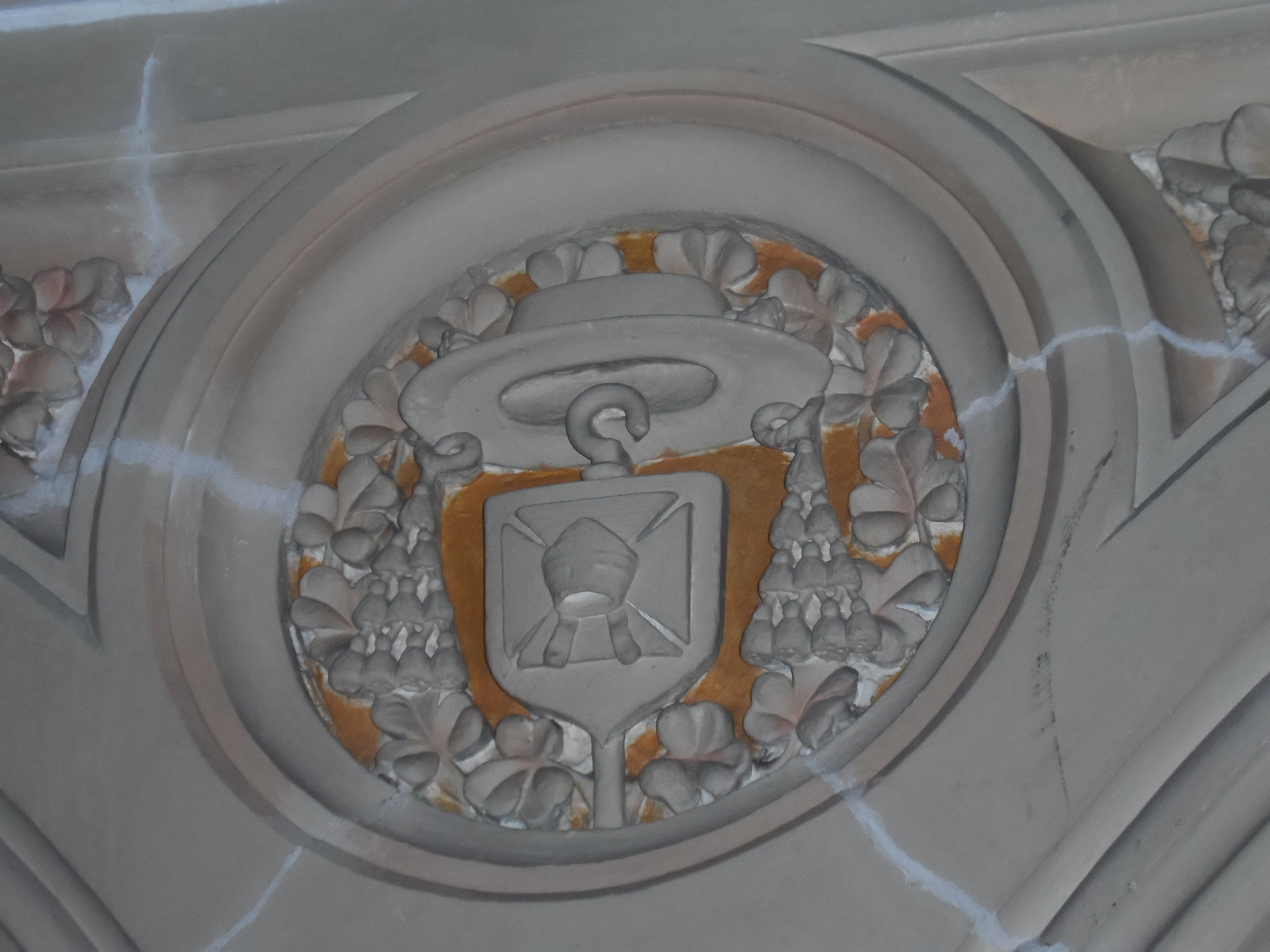
Arms of the Roman Catholic Diocese of Cork and Ross: Argent a cross pattée gules charged with a crosier in pale, enfiled with a mitre labelled or.

The Diocese of Cork and Ross (Irish: Deoise Chorcaí agus Rosa) is a Latin diocese of the Catholic Church in Ireland, one of six suffragan dioceses in the ecclesiastical province of Cashel and Emly.

The cathedral church of the diocese is Cathedral of St Mary and St Anne in Cork city.

The incumbent bishop of the diocese is Fintan Gavin.

== History ==
=== Diocese of Cork (1111-1429) ===
The original Diocese of Cork was established by the Synod of Ráth Breasail in 1111, but was reduced in size by the establishment of separate Dioceses of Cloyne and Ross at the Synod of Kells in 1152.

=== Diocese of Cork and Cloyne (1429–1748) ===
On petition of King Edward II, Pope John XXII issued a papal bull for the union of the Dioceses of Cork and Cloyne on 30 July 1326, with effect from the death of either bishop. The union should have taken effect on the death of Philip of Slane in 1327, but bishops were still appointed to both dioceses.

The dioceses were eventually united on the episcopal appointment of Jordan Purcell on 15 June 1429, following their impoverishment from the robbery of church property by the nobility.

From 1693 to 1747, the Bishop of Cork and Cloyne was also the apostolic administrator of the Diocese of Ross.

=== Diocese of Cork (1748–1958) ===
Following a decree by Pope Benedict XIV on 10 December 1747, the Diocese of Cork was reconstituted as a stand-alone entity, while the Diocese of Cloyne was united with Ross.

=== Diocese of Cork and Ross (1958–present) ===
The modern-day Diocese of Cork and Ross was formed by an ex aequo principaliter union of the Dioceses of Cork and Ross on 19 April 1958.

== Geography ==
The diocese is divided into 67 parishes, all of which are in County Cork. 56 parishes were part of the former Diocese of Cork, while 11 were part of the Diocese of Ross. The diocesan boundary with the neighbouring Diocese of Cloyne roughly follows the course of the River Lee.

The parishes are grouped into sixteen "families of parishes", twelve of which came into effect on 10 September 2022, in which each priest will be resident in one parish but ministering across the entire family of parishes, and greater opportunities will exist for lay participation and shared leadership.

Aside from the cathedral city of Cork and the co-cathedral town of Skibbereen, the main towns in the diocese are Bandon, Carrigaline, Carrigtwohill, Clonakilty and Kinsale.

Family Name	Parishes
Family 1	Ardfield and Rathbarry; Barryroe; Clonakilty; Kilmeen and Castleventry; Rosscarbery and Lisavaird; Timoleague
Family 2	Aughadown; Castlehaven and Myross; Kilmacabea; Rath and the Islands; Skibbereen
Family 3	Ballincollig; Ballinora; Ovens and Farran
Family 4	Ballinhassig; Clontead; Courceys; Kinsale
Family 5	Ballyphehane; The Lough; Togher
Family 6	Bandon; Enniskeane and Desertserges; Innishannon and Knockavilla; Kilbrittain; Kilmurry; Murragh and Templemartin
Family 7	Bantry; Caheragh; Goleen; Muintir Bháire; Schull
Family 8	Carrigaline; Crosshaven; Monkstown; Passage West; Tracton Abbey
Family 9	Carrignavar; Glanmire; Glounthaune; Watergrasshill and Glenville
Family 10	Clogheen and Kerry Pike; Farranree; Gurranabraher; Knocknaheeny and Hollyhill
Family 11	Drimoleague; Dunmanway; Kilmichael; Uibh Laoire
Family 12	South Parish; Ss Peter and Paul; St Patrick's

The following parishes will be restructured into four Families of Parishes in 2023.

Parishes
- Ballineaspaig
- Ballinlough
- Blackpool, The Glen and Ballyvolane
- Blackrock
- Blackrock Road
- Cathedral
- Curraheen Road
- Douglas and Rochestown
- Frankfield and Grange
- Mahon
- Sacred Heart
- St Joseph's, Mayfield
- Turner's Cross
- Upper Mayfield
- Wilton

== Ordinaries ==
The following is a list of bishops since the unification of the Dioceses of Cork and Ross in 1958:

- Cornelius Lucey (1952–1980)
- Michael Murphy (1980–1996)
- John Buckley (1997–2019)
- Fintan Gavin (2019–present)

== See also ==
- Catholic Church in Ireland
- Diocese of Cork
- Diocese of Ross
- Church of Ireland Diocese of Cork, Cloyne and Ross

== Bibliography ==
- Bolster, Evelyn (1972). A History of the Diocese of Cork: From the earliest times to the Reformation. Shannon: Irish University Press. ISBN 978-0-7165-0995-0.
- Eubel, Conradus, ed. (1913). Hierarchia catholica, Tomus 1 (second ed.). Münster: Libreria Regensbergiana. pp. 211–212. (in Latin)
- Eubel, Conradus, ed. (1914). Hierarchia catholica, Tomus 2 (second ed.). Münster: Libreria Regensbergiana.
- Eubel, Conradus, ed. (1923). Hierarchia catholica, Tomus 3 (second ed.). Münster: Libreria Regensbergiana.
- Gauchat, Patritius (Patrice) (1935). Hierarchia catholica IV (1592–1667). Münster: Libraria Regensbergiana.
