= James Roche (bishop) =

Roman-catholic bishop

- Bishop of Cloyne
- Church: Catholic Church
- Diocese: Diocese of Cloyne
- In office: 23 March 1935 – 31 August 1956
- Predecessor: Robert Browne
- Successor: John Ahern
- Previous posts: Titular Bishop of Sebastopolis in Armenia (1931-1935); Coadjutor Bishop of Cloyne (1931-1935); Bishop of Ross (1926-1931)

Orders
- Ordination: 29 October 1893
- Consecration: 30 May 1926 by John Harty

Personal details
- Born: 19 October 1870 Midleton, County Cork, United Kingdom of Great Britain and Ireland
- Died: 31 August 1956 (aged 85)
- Buried: St Colman's Cathedral, Cobh

James Roche (b Midleton 19 October 1870; d Cobh 31 August 1956) was a 20th century Irish Roman Catholic Bishop.

He served as Bishop of Ross from 1926 to 1931;Coadjutor Bishop of Cloyne and Titular Bishop of Sebastopolis in Armenia from 1931 to 1935; and Roman Catholic Bishop of Cloyne from 1935 until his death.

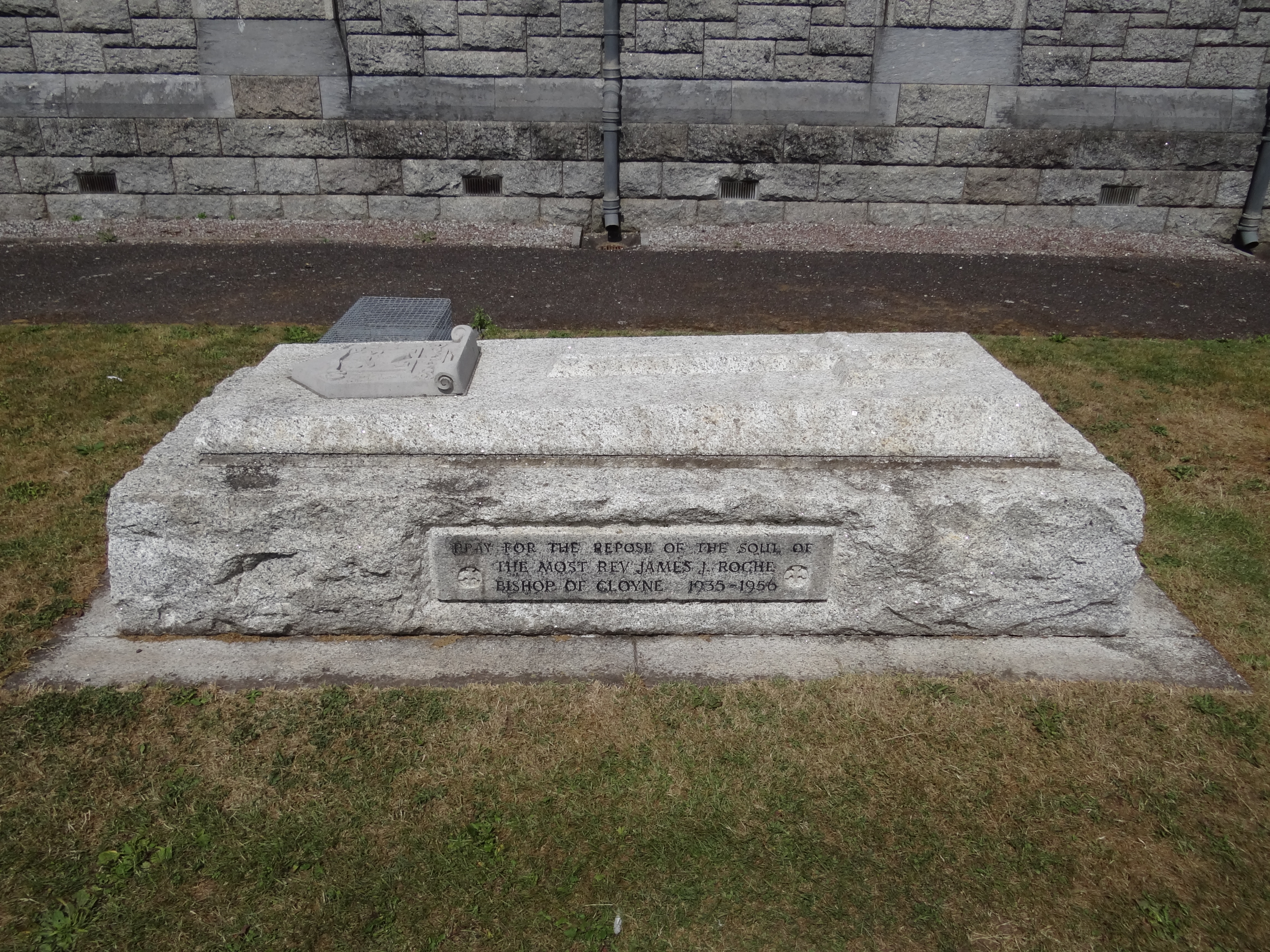
Roche's tomb outside St Colman's Cathedral (Cobh).

He is buried near the St Colman's Cathedral in Cobh.

Catholic Church titles
Preceded by Denis Kelly	Roman Catholic Bishop of Ross; 1926–1931	Succeeded by Patrick Casey
Preceded by Robert Browne	Roman Catholic Bishop of Cloyne; 1935–1956	Succeeded by John Ahern
