= Cathedral Church of St. Fachtna =

Anglican cathedral in Ireland

Coordinates: 51°34′41″N 9°01′46″W

Ross Cathedral
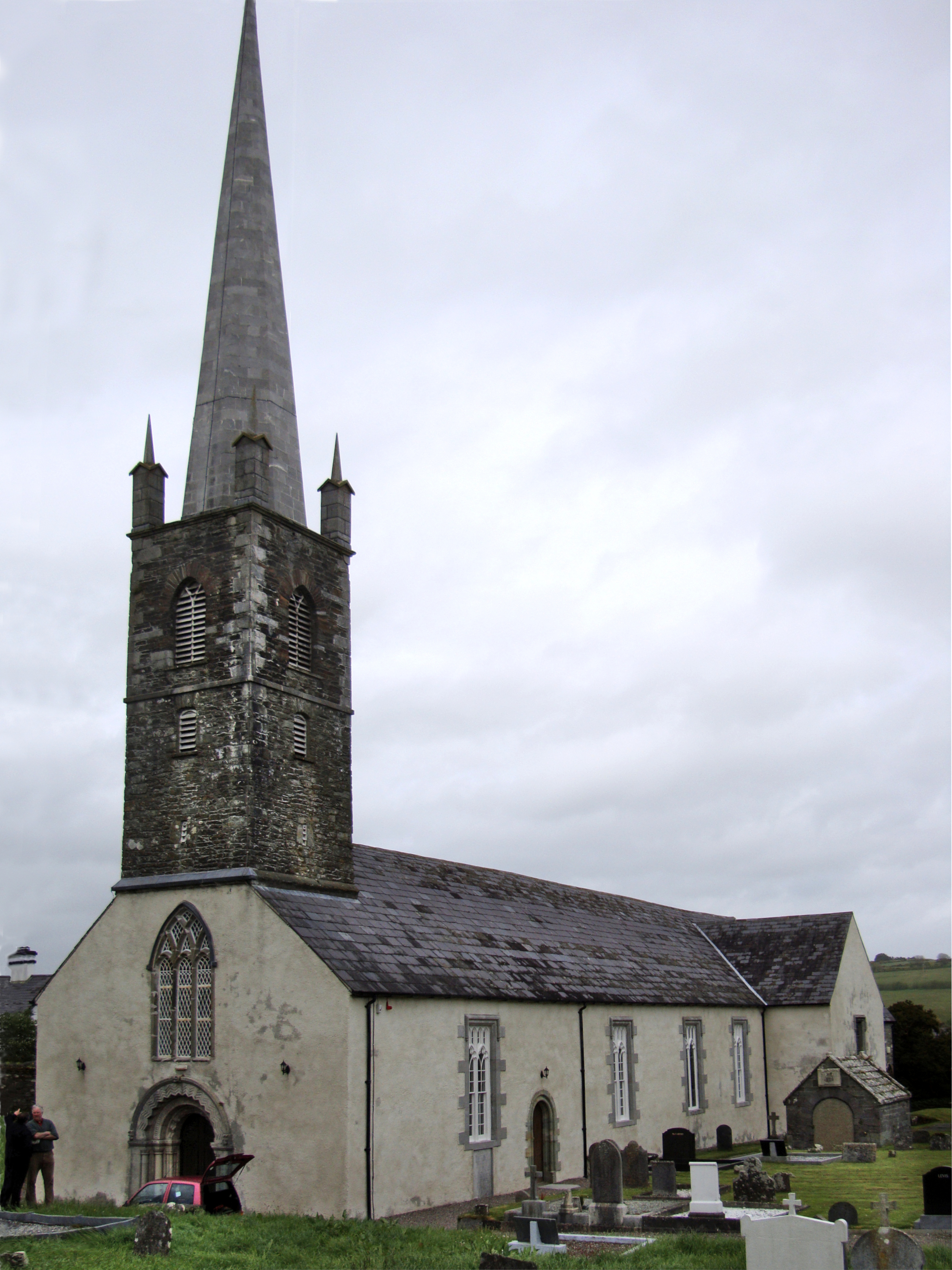
- Ross Cathedral
- Denomination: Church of Ireland
- Previous denomination: Roman Catholic

History
- Dedication: Saint Fachtna

Administration
- Province: Province of Dublin
- Diocese: Diocese of Cork, Cloyne and Ross

Clergy
- Bishop: Paul Colton
- Dean: C. Jeffers

The Cathedral Church of St. Fachtna, also known as the Cathedral Church of St Faughan, Ross Cathedral, and Rosscarbery Cathedral, is a cathedral of the Church of Ireland in Rosscarbery, County Cork in Ireland. Located in the ecclesiastical province of Dublin, it is the smallest cathedral in Ireland. Having once been the mother church of the Diocese of Ross, it is now one of three Anglican cathedrals in the United Dioceses of Cork, Cloyne and Ross, alongside Saint Fin Barre's Cathedral and Cloyne Cathedral.

Dating from the 1600s, it was extensively refurbished in the 19th century.

== History ==
=== Early history ===
Fachtna of Rosscarbery came to the area in the late sixth century and founded a monastic site. It was known contemporaneously as Ros Ailithir, or "wood of the pilgrims". This had been the principal monastery of West Cork; Brendan the Navigator taught there, and it was a school for international students in its time. The ruins of a church erected by St Faughnan [sic] still exist on the southern slope of the land on which Rosscarbery is built. A church or cathedral has occupied the site since at least the tenth century, and after Bishop John Edmund de Courcy resigned in 1517, Pope Leo X ordered an inquiry into the state of the diocese, and it was noted that by then a cathedral stood on the site. It was known at that time as Tiompal mor Feachtna, or "Feachtna's big temple".

=== 16th century ===
After the reformation, no Bishop of Ross was appointed by the crown until 1582, when William Lyon was enthroned. He was the last bishop to serve before the Diocese of Ross was merged with the Diocese of Cork. Bishop Lyon was unsatisfied with the cathedral, and undertook the erection of what he deemed to be a more suitable building. The building was either substantially renovated or entirely rebuilt, either between 1582 and 1589, or between 1589 and 1612. This building was built in the perpendicular English style.

Previously the cathedral church of the Diocese of Ross, in 1583 the diocese of Ross was joined with the diocese of Cork, with the see being held in Cork ever since. It is now one of three cathedrals in the United Dioceses of Cork, Cloyne and Ross, with Cloyne having been added in 1835.

=== 17th century ===
During the Catholic Rebellion of 1641, the church suffered extensive damage, leaving it "wrecked". The nave and tower were destroyed, and the chancel and two chapels were used as a slaughterhouse. The former house of Bishop Lyon (who had died in 1617) was burnt down, and his deaf and dumb daughter perished in the fire. In the 1660s the nave was rebuilt. In 1696 it was ordered that a tower be built. Fallow describes the cathedral as having been "almost entirely rebuilt in the seventeenth century".

=== 18th century - present ===
The spire of the original building was removed in either 1785, 1793, or 1795, with the current spire being added in 1806 at a cost of IR£964. The walls of the church were freestone, but what remained of the old walls were plastered and dashed in 1880. Storms have blown the top of the spire over on two occasions, once in the winter of 1886, and then again in February 1923.

Between 2002 and 2005, major restorations were carried out on the cathedral, including rebuilding the organ and restoring the bells. In 2012, an additional bell was added to the tower.

== Architecture ==
St Fachtna's is the smallest cathedral in Ireland, being the size of a typical parish church. Its tower is also the only tower in Ireland fitted with a ring of bells which has a ringers' gallery, allowing the ringing of the bells to be witnessed by the congregation. The building is cruciform.

Peter Galloway described the building, as "an odd collection of architectural bits and pieces", noting that it incorporates only a little medieval work, while the mixture of Gothic and Georgian windows along with wooden casements with stone linteled heads leave the cathedral with a confusing architectural style. Located beneath the tower, the west doorway is in the Romanesque style.

The Cathedral contains a ring of six bells in the key of G, which are regularly rung. The tenor bell weighs 636 kg.

== See also ==
- Bishop of Ross (Ireland)
- Dean of Ross, Ireland
