= Bishop of Ross (Ireland) =

Bishopric in Ireland

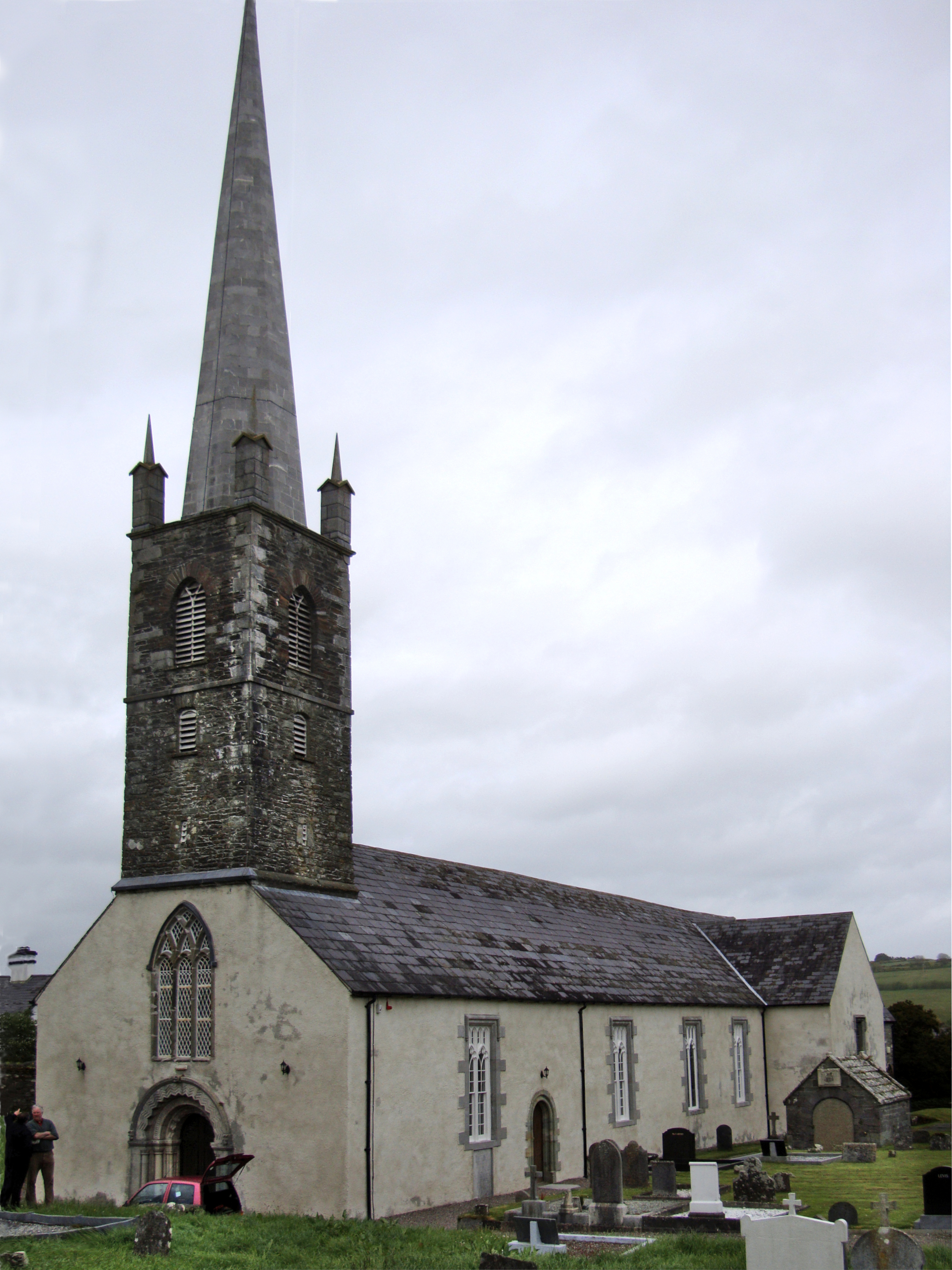
St Fachtna's Cathedral, Rosscarbery, the episcopal seat of the pre-Reformation and Church of Ireland bishops of Ross.

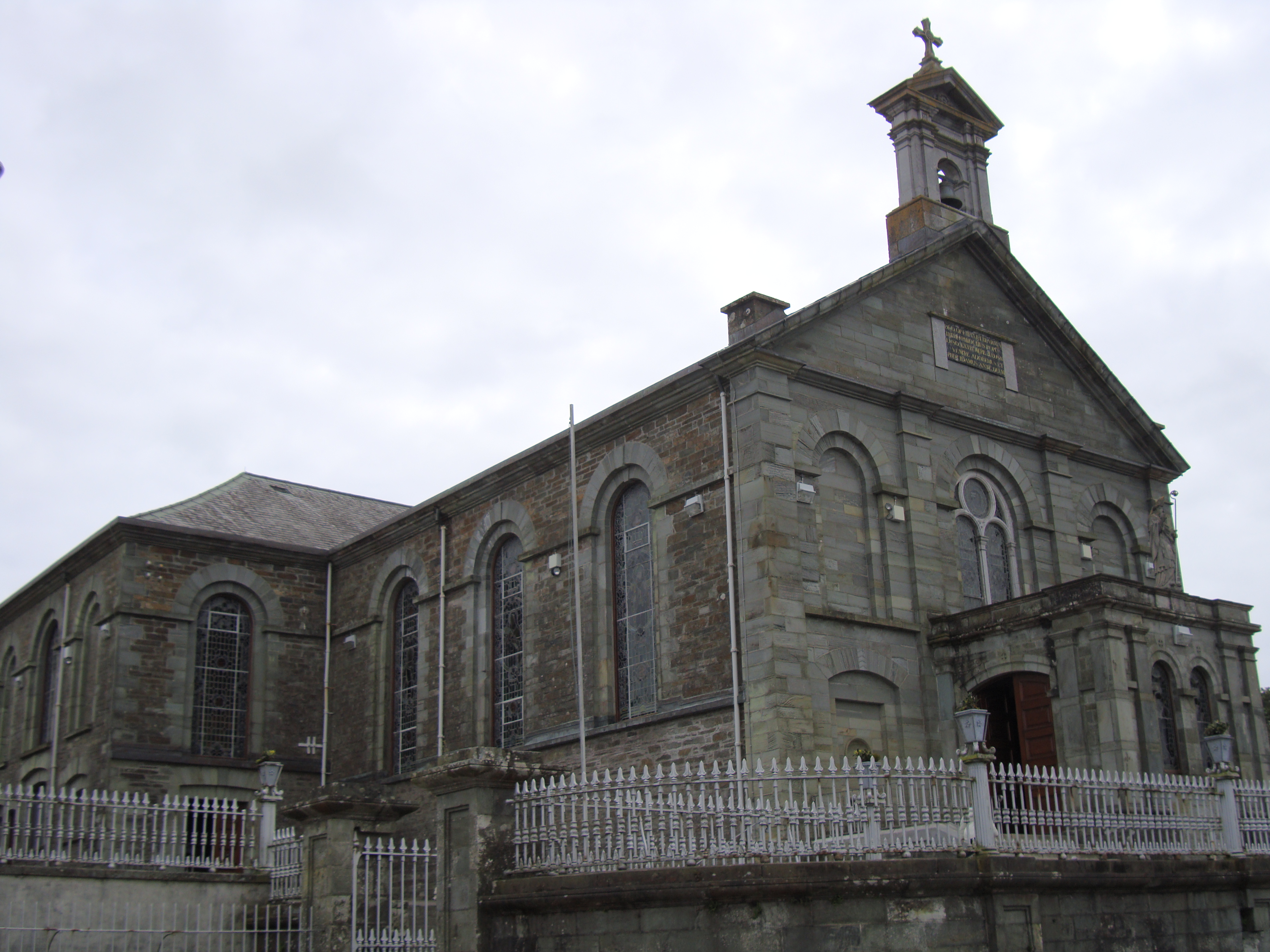
St. Patrick's Cathedral, Skibbereen, the episcopal seat of the Roman Catholic bishops of Ross.

The Bishop of Ross (Irish: Ross Ailithir; Corco Loígde; Latin: Rossensis) was a separate episcopal title which took its name after the town of Rosscarbery in County Cork, Ireland. The title is now united with other bishoprics. In the Church of Ireland it is held by the Bishop of Cork, Cloyne and Ross, and in the Roman Catholic Church it is held by the Bishop of Cork and Ross.

== Pre-Reformation bishops ==
Pre-Reformation Bishops of Ross
From	Until	Incumbent	Notes
unknown	1160	Nechtan Mac Nechtain	Died in office.
unknown	1168	? Ua Cerbaill	Also known as O'Carroll. He was either bishop of Ross or Roscrea.
fl. 1173–1177		Benedictus	
fl. 1192	c. 1195	Mauricius	
c. 1196	1223	Daniel	Elected circa 1196 and consecrated before January 1198. Died in office in 1223.
1224	c. 1253	Fingen Ó Clothna	Also known as Florentius. Elected before 7 May 1224. Resigned before January 1253.
1253	1265	Mauricius	Formerly precentor of Cloyne. Elected before 16 July 1253, consecrated after 2 March 1254, and received possession of the temporalities after 18 July 1254. Resigned circa 25 April 1265.
1269	1274	Ualter Ó Mithigéin, O.F.M.	Also known as Walter O'Mithigein. Elected before 23 September 1269 and received possession of the temporalities after that date. Died in office before 13 December 1274.
fl. 1269–1272		Matthaeus	Elected circa 1269 and confirmed by Pope Gregory X on 28 December 1272, but did not get possession of the see.
1275	1290	Peter Ó h-Uallacháin, O.Cist.	Possibly also known as Patricius. Elected before 25 March 1275 and received possession of the temporalities on 25 March 1275. Died in office on 21 September 1290.
1291	1310	Laurentius	Formerly a canon of Ross. Elected before 12 January 1291 and received possession of the temporalities on that date. Died in office before 8 March 1310.
1310	1320	Matthaeus Ó Finn	Elected and received possession of the temporalities after 8 March 1310. Died in office on 16 October 1320.
1320	1331	See vacant	
1331	1335	Laurentius Ó h-Uallacháin	Elected on 30 April 1331 and received possession of the temporalities on 14 August 1331. Died in office in 1335.
1336	1377	Dionysius	Elected in 1336. Died in office in 1377.
1377	1379	See vacant	
1379	c. 1399	Bernard Ó Conchobhair, O.F.M.	Also known as Bernard O'Connor. Received possession of the temporalities on 3 February 1379. Translated to Limerick circa 1399, but the translation did not take effect.
c. 1399		Peter Curragh	Also known as Peter Creagh. Translated from Limerick circa 1399, but the translation did not take effect.
c. 1399		Thaddaeus O Ceallaigh	Abbot of Maure (Abbeymahon). Papal provision circa 1399, but did not take effect.
1401	1403	Mac Raith Ó hEidirsgeóil	Also known as Macrobius or Matthaeus. Papal provision before 4 August 1401, but annulled on 25 June 1403, and died in 1418.
1403	aft.1420	Stephen Brown, O.Carm.	Papal provision on 24 April 1399, but apparently did not take effect. Received possession of the temporalities on 6 May 1402 and papal provision again on 25 June 1403. Acted as a suffragan bishop in the dioceses of St David's (1408), Bath & Wells (1410), Hereford (1418), and Worcester (1420). Died after 1420.
1418	1423	Walter Formay, O.F.M.	Papal provision on 14 November 1418, Died in office before September 1423.
1424		John Bloxworth, O.Carm.	Papal provision on 24 September 1424, but did not take effect.
1426	unknown	Conchobhar Mac Fhaolchadha, O.F.M.	Also known as Cornelius. Papal provision on 19 August 1426. Not known his episcopate ended, but died before December 1448.
unknown	c. 1431	Maurice Brown	Died before July 1431, since he only appears in the papal provision of his successor Walter of Leicester.
1431	unknown	Walter of Leicester, O.P.	Papal provision on 13 July 1431.
1434	unknown	Richard Clerk	Formerly a clerc in the Diocese of Meath. Papal provision on 10 March 1434. Acted as a suffragan bishop in the dioceses of London (1434–41), Canterbury (1439–65), and Salisbury (1454). Died after 1465.
1448	bef. 1474	Domhnall Ó Donnobháin	Formerly a clerc in the Diocese of Ross. Papal provision on 4 November 1448. Resigned and died before 1474
unknown	1460	Johnannes	Acted as a suffragan bishop in the Bath & Wells (1450–60). Died in March 1460.
1460	unknown	Robert Colynson	Formerly a priest in the Diocese of York. Papal provision on 19 March 1460
1464	unknown	John Hornse	Also known as John Skipton. Acted as a suffragan bishop in the dioceses of Norwich (1466–69) and Bath & Wells (1479–81). Died after 1481.
1473	1494	Aodh Ó hEidirsgeóil	Also known as Odo. Formerly a canon of Ross. Papal provision on 24 March and consecrated on 11 April 1473. Died before September 1494.
1482	1483	Thaddeus McCarthy	Also known as Tadhg Mac Cartaigh. Formerly a canon of Cork. Papal provision on 29 March and consecrated on 3 May 1482. Deprived on 3 August 1483. Later appointed Bishop of Cork and Cloyne on 21 April 1490.
1494	1517	John Edmund de Courcy, O.F.M.	Translated from Clogher on 26 September 1494. Resigned on 4 November 1517.
1517	1519	Seaán Ó Muirthile, O.Cist.	Also known as John O'Murily. Formerly abbot of Maure (Abbeymahon). Papal provision on 4 November 1517. Died on 9 January 1519.
1519	1526	Tadhg Ó Raghallaigh	Also known as Thaddeus. Papal provision Bishop of Dromore on 30 April 1511 and Bishop of Ross on 23 December 1519. Held both sees until his death sometime before June 1526.
fl. 1523		Bonaventura	A native of Spain. No record of a papal provision, but believed to be alive around 27 March 1523.

== Bishops during the Reformation ==
Bishops of Ross during the Reformation
From	Until	Incumbent	Notes
1526	1552	Dermot MacCarthy, O.S.A.	Also known as Diarmaid Mac Carthaigh. Papal provision on 6 June 1526. Died in office in 1552.
1554	1559	Maurice O'Fihely, O.F.M.	Papal provision on 12 January 1554 and again on 25 May 1554. Died in office before 27 January 1559.

== Post-Reformation bishops ==
=== Church of Ireland succession ===
Church of Ireland Bishops of Ross
From	Until	Incumbent	Notes
1559	1582	See vacant	
1582	1583	William Lyon	Nominated by the crown on 30 March 1582 and appointed by letters patent on 12 May 1582. Became Bishop of Cork, Cloyne and Ross in November 1583. Died in office on 4 October 1617.
1583	1638	Part of the united bishopric of Cork, Cloyne and Ross.	
1638	1660	Part of the united bishopric of Cork and Ross.	
1660	1678	Part of the united bishopric of Cork, Cloyne and Ross.	
1679	1835	Part of the united bishopric of Cork and Ross.	
Since 1835		Part of the united bishopric of Cork, Cloyne and Ross.	

=== Roman Catholic succession ===
Roman Catholic Bishops of Ross
From	Until	Incumbent	Notes
1559	c. 1561	Maurice O'Hea	Papal provision on 7 April 1559. Died in office circa 1561.
1561	1580	Thomas O'Herlihy	Papal provision on 17 December 1561. Died in office on 11 March 1580.
1582	1587	Bonaventura Naughton, O.F.M.	Papal provision on 20 August 1582. Died in office on 14 February 1587.
1587	1597	See vacant	
1597	unknown	(Eugene Egan (I.), vicar apostolic)	Appointed vicar apostolic by papal brief on 30 May 1597 (N.S.).
1619	unknown	(Florence MacCarthy, vicar apostolic)	Appointed vicar apostolic by papal brief on 15 July 1619 (N.S.). Presumably died or replaced on Barry's appointment.
1620	1647	(Robert Barry, vicar apostolic)	Appointed vicar apostolic by papal brief on 27 May 1620 (N.S.). Afterwards appointed Bishop of Cork and Cloyne on 8 April 1647.
1647	1650	Boetius MacEgan, O.F.M.	Papal provision on 11 March 1647 (N.S.) and consecrated on 25 March 1648. Hanged after the Battle of Macroom on 11 May 1650 (N.S.).
1657	unknown	(Eugene Egan (II.), vicar apostolic)	Appointed vicar apostolic by papal brief on 17 April 1657 (N.S.).
1693	1712	(John Baptist Sleyne, apostolic administrator)	Bishop of Cork and Cloyne (1693–1712). Appointed apostolic administrator of Ross by papal brief on 11 March 1647 (N.S.). Resigned on 22 January 1712 (N.S.) and died on 16 February 1712 (N.S.).
1712	1732	See vacant	Christopher Butler, Archbishop of Cashel, may have been apostolic administrator of Ross from circa 1711 until resigned the post in September 1730, but this has not been substantiated.
1732	1747	(Thaddeus MacCarthy, apostolic administrator)	Bishop of Cork and Cloyne (1954–1958). Appointed apostolic administrator of Ross by papal brief on 20 June 1732 (N.S.). Died in office on 14 August 1747.
1747	1850	Part of the united bishopric of Cloyne and Ross	
1850	1857	William Keane	Papal provision on 24 November 1850, papal brief issued on 20 December 1850, and consecrated on 2 February 1851. Translated to Cloyne on 5 May 1857.
1857	1876	Micheal O'Hea	Papal provision on 4 October 1857, papal brief issued on 11 December 1857, and consecrated on 7 February 1858. Died in office on 18 December 1876.
1877	1896	William Fitzgerald	Appointed by papal brief on 7 September 1877 and consecrated on 11 November 1877. Died in office on 24 November 1896.
1897	1924	Denis Kelly	Appointed by papal brief on 29 March 1897 and consecrated on 9 May 1897. Died in office on 18 April 1924.
1926	1931	James Roche	Papal provision on 31 March 1926 and consecrated on 30 May 1926. Translated to Cloyne as coadjutor bishop on 26 June 1931.
1931	1935	See vacant	By special arrangement with the Holy See, James Roche continued as apostolic administrator of Ross from 26 June 1931 until succeeded diocesan bishop of Cloyne on 23 March 1935.
1935	1940	Patrick Casey	Papal provision on 22 June 1935 and consecrated on 15 September 1935. Died in office on 19 September 1940.
1941	1953	Denis Moynihan	Papal provision on 5 July 1941 and consecrated on 21 September 1941. Translated to Kerry on 10 February 1953.
1954	1958	(Cornelius Lucey, apostolic administrator)	Bishop of Cork (1952–1958). Appointed apostolic administrator of Ross on 20 February 1954. Became Bishop of Cork and Ross on 19 April 1958 when the two sees were united.
Since 1958		Part of the united bishopric of Cork and Ross.	
