= Michael Augustine O'Riordan =

Irish architect and Presentation brother

- Born: c. 1783
- Died: 20 January 1848 (aged 64–65)
- Occupations: architect, Presentation brother
- Years active: 1810-1840s
- Known for: Ecclesiastical architecture
- Style: Palladian neoclassical with Romanesque elements

Brother Michael Augustine O'Riordan (c. 1783 – 20 January 1848), also known as Michael Augustine Riordan, was an Irish Presentation Brother and ecclesiastical architect active in early 19th-century Munster. Based in Cork, he is noted for designing churches, convents, and schools. His work contributed to the development of Catholic architecture in the decades following the Penal Laws, particularly in the dioceses of Cork, Cloyne, Ross and Kerry.

== Architectural style ==
Riordan's churches are identifiable by consistent architectural features. The exteriors typically follow a "severe Palladian neoclassical style with a pediment and bell-tower over the main entrance", incorporating a large, round-headed Romanesque window at the centre, flanked by statue niches, with smaller niches for holy water stoups beside the main door.

Most of his churches followed a T-plan—a simplified cruciform layout without a projecting chancel. Internally, they often included galleries in the transepts, an organ gallery, and a high altar placed at the head of the nave.

Several altar designs incorporate recurring element of a tripartite Serliana retable—a central arched niche flanked by rectangular panels, framed by fluted corinthian columns and enriched with classical plaster ornamentation. Notable examples are found at St John the Baptist Church, Kinsale and St Patrick’s Church, Dunmanway.

== Notable buildings ==
St Patrick's Church, Dunmanway, completed to the design of Michael Augustine O'Riordan

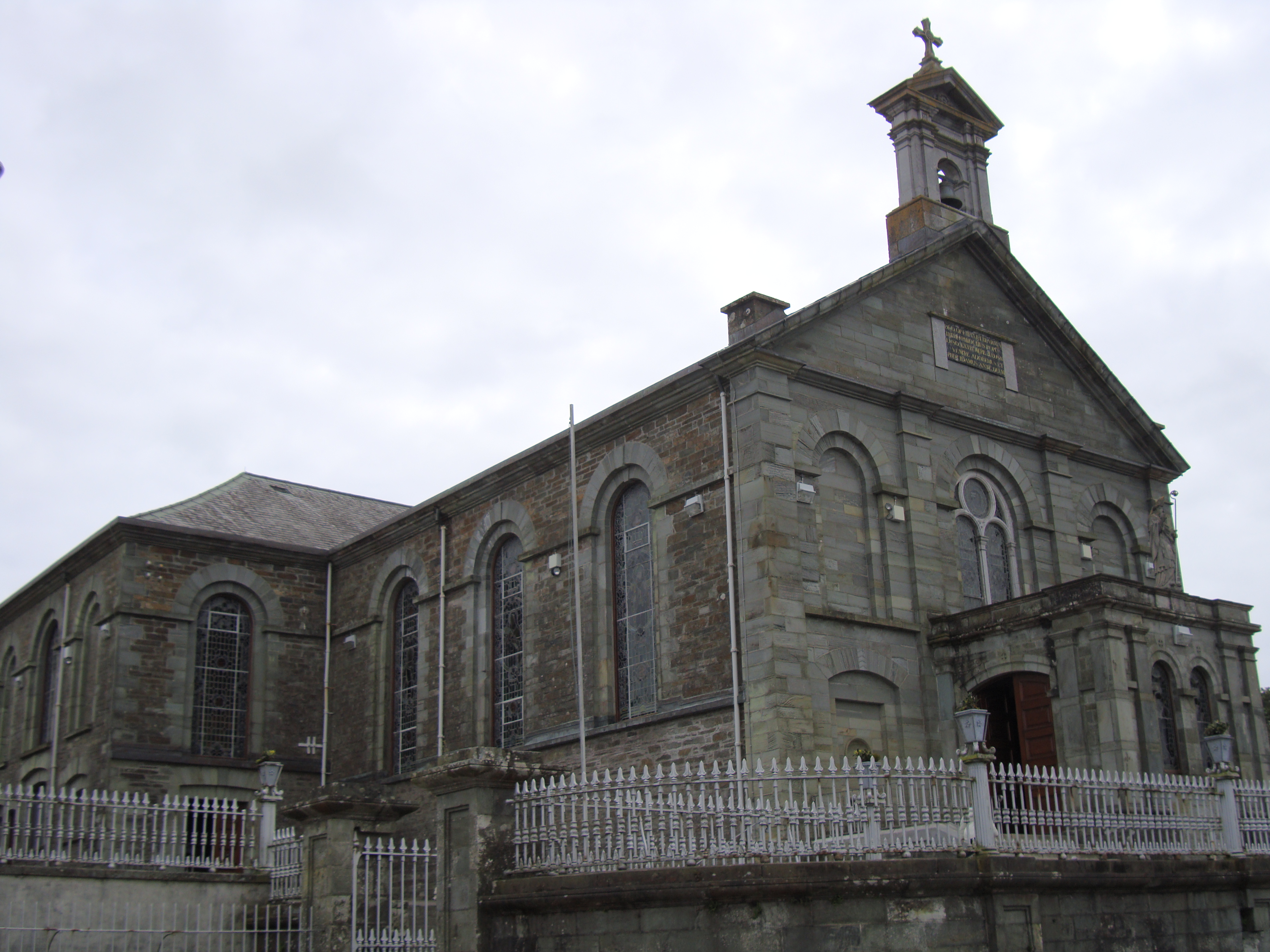
St Patrick's Cathedral, Skibbereen

Buildings designed by O'Riordan include:

=== Diocese of Cork and Ross ===
- St Finbarr's Church, Bantry
- St Patricks Church, Dunmanway
- St Patrick's Cathedral, Skibbereen
- St John the Baptist Church, Kinsale
- St John the Baptist, Ovens
- St. Joseph’s Church, Castletown-Kinneigh
- St. Mary's, Kilmeen and Castleventry
- Ursaline Convent, Blackrock, Cork
- St. Michael's, Blackrock
- St. Barrahane's, Castlehaven

=== Diocese of Cloyne ===
- St. Mary's Church, Mallow (the original church building)
- The Church of St. Nicholas, Killavullen
- Church of the Nativity of the Blessed Virgin Mary, Doneraile
- Church of the Nativity of the Blessed Virgin Mary, Ballyhea
- Parochial schools, Cobh

=== Diocese of Kerry ===
- St Patrick's Church, Milstreet

=== Diocese of Waterford and Lismore ===
- Presentation Convent, Clonmel
