= Skiddy =

Skiddy may refer to:

- Skiddy, Kansas
- Roger Skiddy, Bishop of Cork and Cloyne from 1557 to 1566
- Skiddy's Almshouse
- Prasidh Krishna (born 1996), Indian cricketer nicknamed "Skiddy"

== See also ==
- Skid (disambiguation)
- Skiddie
