= Robert Browne (bishop) =

Irish priest and bishop, President of Maynooth College

- Bishop of Cloyne
- Church: Catholic Church
- Diocese: Diocese of Cloyne
- In office: 26 June 1894 – 23 March 1935
- Predecessor: John McCarthy
- Successor: James Roche

Orders
- Ordination: 18 May 1869
- Consecration: 19 August 1894 by Thomas Croke

Personal details
- Born: 6 November 1844 Charleville, County Cork, United Kingdom of Great Britain and Ireland
- Died: 23 March 1935 (aged 90) Cobh, County Cork, Irish Free State

Robert Browne (6 November 1844 – 23 March 1935) was an Irish Roman Catholic priest who served as President of Maynooth College and Bishop of Cloyne.

== Life ==
Robert Browne was born in Charleville, Co. Cork to Robert Browne and Margaret Mullins. He was educated at St. Colman's College, Fermoy in Cork before he pursued clerical studies at St. Patrick's College, Maynooth. Browne was ordained on 18 May 1869 for Cloyne Diocese where he ministered and worked in St. Colman's College in 1870. Rev. Browne returned to Maynooth College in 1874 and became Dean in 1875, vice-President in 1883 and President in 1885 a position he held until he was appointed Bishop of Cloyne in 1894.

During Browne's tenure as president of Maynooth many developments were undertaken such as the completion of the college chapel and exhibition hall. He also served as editor of the "Irish Ecclesiastical Record" until his appointment as Bishop.

His nephew was the Jesuit priest and noted photographer of the Titanic and First World War Francis Browne SJ, whom, since his parents died when he was quite young, Bishop Browne raised and supported, purchasing his first camera and giving him a present of tickets to travel from Southampton to Queenstown (Cobh).

Browne died on 23 May 1935.

== See also ==
- Catholic Church in Ireland
