= William Keane (bishop) =

Roman-catholic bishop

- Bishop of Cloyne
- Church: Catholic Church
- Diocese: Diocese of Cloyne
- In office: 15 May 1857 – 15 January 1874
- Predecessor: Timothy Murphy
- Successor: John McCarthy
- Previous post: Bishop of Ross (1850-1857)

Orders
- Ordination: 2 July 1828
- Consecration: 2 February 1851 by Michael Slattery

Personal details
- Born: 7 April 1805 Castlemartyr, County Cork, United Kingdom of Great Britain and Ireland
- Died: 15 January 1874 (aged 68) Queenstown, County Cork, United Kingdom of Great Britain and Ireland

William Keane (b Castlemartyr 7 April 1805; d Queenstown 15 January 1874) was a nineteenth-century Irish Roman Catholic bishop.

Keane was educated at the Irish College in Paris. He was ordained priest in Paris on 2 July September 1828, and was on the staff of the ICP for 11 years. He returned to be curate of Fermoy, after which he was parish priest at Midleton from 1841 to 1851. He was Bishop of Ross from 1851 to 1857 Keane was Bishop of Ross from 1877 when he was translated to Cloyne.

== Sources ==
- Fryde, E. B.; Greenway, D. E.; Porter, S.; Roy, I., eds. (1986). Handbook of British Chronology (3rd, reprinted 2003 ed.). Cambridge: Cambridge University Press. ISBN 0-521-56350-X.
