= Diocese of Ross =

The Diocese of Ross can refer to:

- Diocese of Ross (Ireland), one of the historical dioceses of Ireland
- Diocese of Ross (Scotland) one of the historical dioceses of Scotland

== See also ==
- Church of Ireland Diocese of Cork, Cloyne and Ross
- Roman Catholic Diocese of Cork and Ross, Ireland
- Scottish Episcopal Diocese of Moray, Ross and Caithness
