= St. Patrick's Cathedral, Skibbereen =

Cathedral in Ireland

Coordinates: 51.5522°N 9.2636°W

St. Patrick's Cathedral
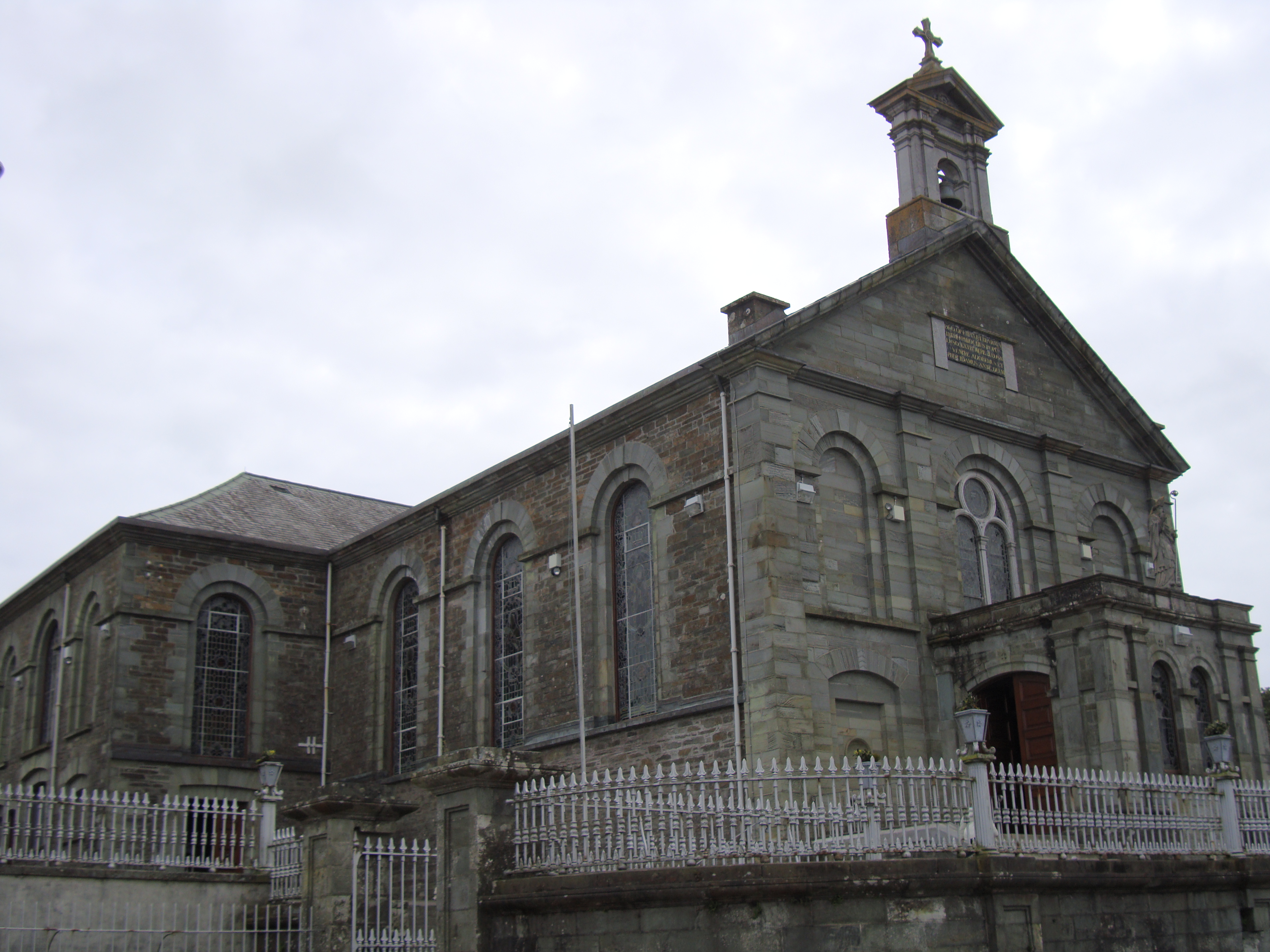
- St. Patrick's Cathedral
- Location: Skibbereen
- Country: Ireland
- Denomination: Catholic Church
- Sui iuris church: Latin Church

St. Patrick's Cathedral or Skibbereen Cathedral in Skibbereen, Ireland, is parish of the Catholic Church in the Diocese of Cork and Ross. It was the seat of the former Diocese of Ross, but lost cathedral status when the see was merged with the Diocese of Cork in 1958.

== Architecture ==
The church was designed by architect Michael Augustine O'Riordan of Doneraile in the neoclassical style. The tympanum of the façade is topped by a belfry. The interior is also neoclassical, but has an uneven appearance due to tunneling in transepts. The Tabernacle had an altarpiece of the Irish painter Samuel Forde, now preserved in the church of St. Barrahane in Castlehaven.

The foundation stone for the present structure was laid in 1825, intended as a parish church in the Diocese of Cloyne and Ross. The original building was completed in 1826. The episcopal see was transferred to the parish under Bishop Michael O'Hea, and his successor, William Fitzgerald, carried out major improvements in the early 1880s. Additional renovations were made in 1950 and 2005.

== See also ==
- Catholic Church in Ireland
