= Diocese of Ross (Ireland) =

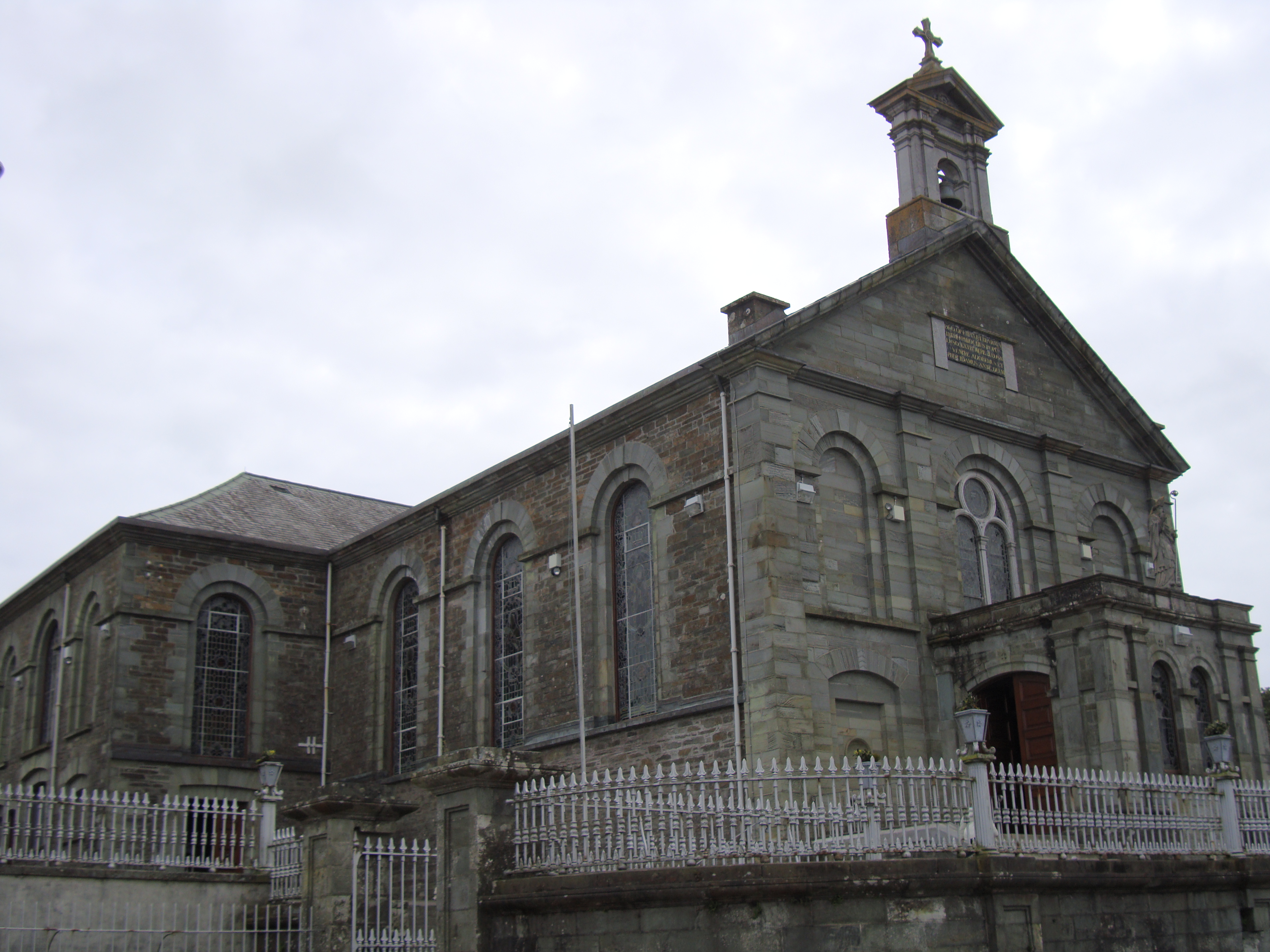

The Diocese of Ross was a separate diocese situated in south-west Ireland. Following the Reformation, there were two dioceses. In the Church of Ireland, the diocese is now part of the Diocese of Cork, Cloyne and Ross. In the Roman Catholic Church, it is part of the Diocese of Cork and Ross. In the 19th century, an exclave of the diocese existed around that part of the Beara peninsula in County Cork including the area around Glengariff though not as far east as Bantry. The main diocesan territory was centred on the towns of Baltimore, Skibbereen, Rosscarbery and Clonakilty which lie along the modern national road N71.

== History ==
This see was founded by St. Fachtna, and the place-name was variously known as Ros Cairbre (Rosscarbery) and Ros Ailithir (Ross of the pilgrims). St. Fachtna founded the School of Ross as well as the see; and his death occurred about 590, on 14 August, on which day his feast is celebrated. At that time the chiefs of the tuath were the O'Leary, known as Uí Laoghaire Ruis Ó gCairbre.

The succession of bishops was uninterrupted till after the Reformation period. In 1207, the Norman King John of England granted the cantred of Ros Ailithir to David Roche, regardless of the claims of the native chief, the O'Driscoll, but the episcopal manors were left undisturbed. In 1306, the value of the bishop's mensa was 26 marks, while the cathedral was valued at 3 marks; and the tribal revenue of the see was but 45 pounds sterling. The number of parishes was 29, divided into 3 divisions; and there was a Cistercian abbey, Carrigilihy (de fonte vivo); also a Benedictine Priory at St. Mary's, Ross. The Franciscans acquired a foundation at Sherkin Island from the O'Driscolls in 1460.

Blessed Thady MacCarthy was appointed Bishop of Ross in 1482, but was forcibly deprived of his see in 1488. However, he was translated to the united bishopric of Cork and Cloyne in 1490; was again a victim of political intrigues, and died a confessor at Ivrea in 1492, being beatified in 1895. In 1517 the revenue of the diocese was but 60 marks. At that date the chapter was complete with 12 canons and 4 vicars, and there were 27 parishes, including three around Berehaven.

Thomas O'Herlihy assisted at the Council of Trent, and ruled from 1562 till his death on 11 March 1580. It was not until 1581 that Elizabeth I, Queen of England and Ireland appointed an Anglican prelate under whom, in 1584, the Sees of Cork and Cloyne were annexed to Ross. However, in the Roman Catholic arrangement Ross continued independent, and Owen MacEgan died a confessor in January, 1602-3. In 1625 the bishop (de Torres) was a Spaniard, who ruled his diocese through a vicar-general.

In 1647 the nave and tower of the cathedral were levelled by the Puritans; and Bishop Boetius MacEgan was hanged by Lord Broghill, on 10 April 1650. At length, in 1693, Bishop John Sleyne of Cork and Cloyne was given Ross in commendam, and the see continued under his successors till 1748, when it was united to Cloyne under Bishop O'Brien. From 1748 Ross was administered by the Bishop of Cloyne, but it regained its autonomy under Bishop Crotty, and in 1857 Bishop O'Hea was consecrated to Ross. During the episcopate of Dr. O'Hea the episcopal see was transferred to Skibbereen. He was followed by William Fitzgerald (1877–97) and Denis Kelly.

== See also ==
- Bishop of Ross (Ireland) (pre- and post-Reformation bishops)
- Cathedral Church of St. Fachtna (Ross Cathedral)
- Dean of Ross, Ireland (list of Church of Ireland deans)
- Diocese of Cork, Cloyne and Ross (current Church of Ireland diocese)
- Diocese of Cork and Ross (current Roman Catholic diocese)
