= Bishop of Cloyne =

Episcopal title

The Bishop of Cloyne is an episcopal title that takes its name after the small town of Cloyne in County Cork, Ireland. In the Roman Catholic Church, it is a separate title; but, in the Church of Ireland, it has been united with other bishoprics.

== Pre-Reformation bishops ==
The diocese of Cloyne has its origins in the monastic settlement founded by St Colman in the 6th century. Cloyne was not one of the dioceses established at the Synod of Rathbreasail in 1111, but a bishop of Cloyne was ruling the diocese by 1148, which was recognised at the Synod of Kells in March 1152.

In 1326, Pope John XXII issued a papal bull for the union of the dioceses of Cork and Cloyne to be united on the death of the bishop of either see. But on the death of Philip of Slane, Bishop of Cork in 1327, the two dioceses remained separate. Bishop Payn of Cloyne obtained a confirmation of the union of the two dioceses from Pope Martin V on 21 September 1418. However, the union did not take effect due to opposition by Bishop Milo fitzJohn of Cork. Bishop Payn of Cloyne resigned in 1429 and Jordan Purcell was appointed bishop of the united see of Cork and Cloyne on 15 June 1429.

List of pre-Reformation Bishops of Cloyne
From	Until	Incumbent	Notes
bef.1148	1149	Gilla na Náem Ua Muirchertaig	Became bishop before 1148; died 1149; also known as Nehemias
unknown	1159	Ua Dubchróin	Abbot of Cloyne; died in office
unknown	1167	Ua Flannacáin	Died in office
fl. 1173–77	1192	Mattaeus Ua Mongaig	fl. 1173 – 1177; died in office
bef.1201	1205	Laurentius Ua Súillebáin	Became bishop before 1201; died in office
c. 1205	unknown	C.	Became bishop c. 1205
bef.1218	1223	Luke	Became bishop before 1218; died in office
1224		(Florentius)	Elected before 24 August 1224, but never consecrated
1226		(William), an O.August	Elected before 20 July 1226, but never consecrated
1226	1234	Daniel	Elected after 31 August 1226; died after October 1234
1234	1240	See vacant	
1240	1246	Ailinn Ó Súillebáin, O.P.	Consecrated c. 1240; translated to Lismore after 26 October 1246
1247	1264	Daniel, O.F.M.	Elected before 12 October 1247 and consecrated after that date; received possession of temporalities 2 July 1248; died before 2 June 1264
1265	1274	Reginaldus	Translated from Down 13 April 1265; died 7 February 1274
1275	1284	Alanus Ó Longáin, O.F.M.	Elected before 18 February 1275; received possession of temporalities 21 February 1275; died c. 5 January 1284
1284	1321	Nicholas of Effingham	Elected after 18 March 1284; received possession of temporalities 2 September 1284; died in June 1321
1321	1333	Mauricius Ó Solcháin	Appointed 8 October 1321; received possession of temporalities 1 August 1322; consecrated after 25 August 1323; died 31 March 1333
1333	c.1351	John Brid, O.Cist.	Appointed 10 August and consecrated after 9 October 1333; received possession of temporalities 16 September 1335; died c. 1351
1351	1362	John Whitekot	Elected before June 1351; received possession of temporalities 18 September 1351; died 7 February 1362
1363	1376	John Swaffham, O.Carm.	Appointed 1 March 1363; received possession of temporalities 14 July 1363; translated to Bangor 2 July 1376
1376	1394	Richard Wyre, O.Carm.	Appointed 2 July 1376; received possession of temporalities 9 November 1376; deprived before 16 March 1394
1394	c.1405	Gerard Caneton, O.E.S.A.	Appointed 16 March 1394; received possession of temporalities 9 November 1394; translated to Elphin c. 1405
1413	1429	Adam Payn, O.E.S.A.	Appointed 26 July 1413; resigned before 15 June 1429; died before January 1432
In 1429, the see part of the united see of Cork and Cloyne.

== Post-Reformation bishops ==
=== Church of Ireland succession ===
After the Reformation, the Church of Ireland see of Cork and Cloyne continued until 1583 when they were united with Ross. For a short while they were separated in 1638 into the bishopric of Cork and Ross and the bishopric of Cloyne, but were reunited again in 1660. Cloyne once again became separate bishopric in 1679. Since 1835, Cloyne has been part of the united diocese of Cork, Cloyne and Ross.

List of Church of Ireland Bishops of Cloyne
From	Until	Incumbent	Notes
1638	1652	George Synge	Nominated 21 June and consecrated 11 November 1638; died 3 August 1652
1652	1661	See vacant	
1661	1679	The see was part of the united bishopric of Cork, Cloyne and Ross.	
1679	1682	Patrick Sheridan, Cloyne	Nominated 11 February and consecrated 27 April 1679; died 22 November 1682
1682	1692	Edward Jones	Nominated 22 December 1682 and consecrated 11 March 1683; translated to St Asaph 13 December 1692
1693	1694	William Palliser	Nominated 20 January and consecrated 5 March 1693; translated to Cashel 26 June 1694
1694	1695	Tobias Pullein	Nominated 29 September and consecrated November 1694; translated to Dromore 7 May 1695
1695	1697	St George Ashe	Nominated 17 March and consecrated 18 July 1695; translated to Clogher 25 June 1697
1697	1702	John Pooley	Nominated 1 June and consecrated 5 December 1697; translated to Raphoe 12 September 1702
1702	1726	Charles Crow	Nominated 18 May and consecrated 18 October 1702; died 26 June 1726
1726	1732	Henry Maule	Nominated 28 July and consecrated 11 September 1726; translated to Dromore 20 March 1732
1732	1734	Edward Synge	Translated from Clonfert and Kilmacduagh; nominated 18 February and letters patent 22 March 1732; translated to Ferns and Leighlin 8 February 1734
1734	1753	George Berkeley	Nominated 18 January and consecrated 19 May 1734; died 14 January 1753
1753	1759	James Stopford	Nominated 19 January and consecrated 11 March 1753; died 24 August 1759
1759	1767	Robert Johnson	Nominated 19 September and consecrated 21 October 1759; died 16 January 1767
1767	1768	Hon.Frederick Augustus Hervey	Nominated 2 February and consecrated 31 May 1767; translated to Derry 18 February 1768
1768	1779	Charles Agar	Nominated 12 February and consecrated 20 March 1768; translated to Cashel 6 August 1779
1780		George Chinnery	Translated from Killaloe and Kilfenora; nominated 29 January and letters patent 15 February 1780; died 13 August 1780
1781	1794	Richard Woodward	Nominated 17 January and consecrated 4 February 1781; died 12 May 1794
1794	1820	William Bennet	Translated from Cork; nominated 20 May and letters patent 27 June 1794; died 16 July 1820
1820	1826	Charles Mongan Warburton	Translated from Limerick, Ardfert and Aghadoe; nominated 26 August and letters patent 18 September 1820; died 9 August 1826
1826	1835	John Brinkley	Nominated 13 September and consecrated 8 October 1826; died 14 September 1835
Since 1835, Cloyne has been part of the Church of Ireland bishopric of Cork, Cloyne and Ross.

=== Roman Catholic succession ===
The Roman Catholic Diocese of Cloyne remained united with Cork until 10 December 1747 when Pope Benedict XIV approved their separation. On the same day it was decreed that Cloyne to be united with Ross. Following a recommendation at the Synod of Thurles, Cloyne and Ross were separated on 24 November 1850.

The current bishop of Cloyne is the Most Reverend William Crean, who was appointed by the Holy See on 25 November 2012 and installed on 27 January 2013.

List of Roman Catholic Bishops of Cloyne and Ross
From	Until	Incumbent	Notes
1747	1769	John O'Brien	Appointed 10 January 1747 and by papal brief 10 January 1748; died 13 March 1769
1769	1791	Matthew McKenna	Appointed 7 August 1769; died 4 June 1791
1791	1830	William Coppinger	Appointed coadjutor bishop 15 January 1788; succeeded 4 June 1791; died 1830
1830	1832	Michael Collins	Appointed coadjutor bishop 7 April 1827; succeeded 1830; died 1832.
1833	1846	Bartholomew Crotty	Appointed 22 March 1833; consecrated 11 June 1833; died 3 October 1846
1847	1849	David Walsh	Appointed 6 February 1847; consecrated 2 May 1847; died 19 January 1849
1849	1850	Timothy Murphy	Appointed 19 April 1849 and consecrated 16 September 1849; relinquished the title bishop of Ross in 1850, but continued as bishop of Cloyne
On 24 November 1850, the Roman Catholic see was separated into the bishoprics of Cloyne and Ross.

List of Roman Catholic Bishops of Cloyne
From	Until	Incumbent	Notes
1850	1856	Timothy Murphy	Hitherto bishop of Cloyne and Ross; died 4 December 1856
1857	1874	William Keane	Translated from Ross; appointed 5 May 1857; died 15 January 1874
1874	1893	John MacCarthy	Appointed 22 August and consecrated 28 October 1874; died 9 December 1893
1894	1935	Robert Browne	Appointed 26 June and consecrated 19 August 1894; died 23 March 1935; uncle of Titanic photographer Fr.Francis Browne
1935	1956	James Roche	Translated from Ross; appointed coadjutor bishop of Cloyne 26 June 1931; succeeded 23 March 1935; died 31 August 1956
1957	1987	John Ahern	Appointed 30 March and consecrated 9 June 1957; retired 17 February 1987; died 25 September 1997
1987	2010	John Magee, S.P.S.	Appointed 17 February and consecrated 17 March 1987; acted as Apostolic Administrator of the Diocese of Limerick from July 1994 to March 1996; stood aside from running the Diocese of Cloyne on 7 March 2010, and formally resigned as Bishop of Cloyne on 24 March 2010.
2012	present	William Crean	Appointed 25 November 2012 and consecrated 27 January 2013.

== See also ==
- Cloyne Cathedral
