= Fachtna of Rosscarbery =

Fachtna of Rosscarbery, known also as Fachanan, was an Irish Christian leader known as the founder of the monastery of Rosscarbery (Ros Ailithir), County Cork. He died around 600.

== Life ==
He established a monastery and school in the area now known as Rosscarbery towards the end of the sixth century. His monastery became the principal monastery of west Cork, and later had a famous Scripture school known as the School of Ross. Brendan, the Navigator, taught in this school, which was crowded with students from every land. It flourished for three hundred years and survived in some form until the coming of the Normans to Ireland. It was the centre from which the Diocese of Ross developed.

Fachtna, born at a place called Tulachteann, was one of the pupils of Saint Ita. It is said that Fachtna was cured of an affection of his eyes by bathing them in the milk of Saint Mochoemoc's mother, Saint Ita's sister. He then studied at Saint Finbarr's school at Loch Eirce (Gougane Barra). Before establishing the monastic school of Ross, he founded the monastery of Molana on an island in the Blackwater, near Youghal.

In some Latin documents, he is called Fachtna Facundus (Fachtna the Eloquent) and even spoken of as Sanctus Facundus. In Irish records, he is generally referred to as Mac Mongach (Hairy Child), because he was reported to have been born with his head covered with hair. The interpretation of this phrase by James Ussher and others as meaning Son of Mongach was rejected by Mervyn Archdall.

The description of Saint Fachtna in Cuimin of Connor's poem on the characteristic virtues of the Irish saints is:

Fachtna, the generous and steadfast, loved
To instruct the crowds in concert,
He never spoke that which was mean,
Nor aught but what was pleasing to his Lord.

Mention is made of Fachtna and Conall of Ros Ailithir within the scholia of the Félire Óengusso in connection with Ciarán of Saigir the Elder who was born and raised on Cape Clear Island.

== Veneration ==
His feast day was 14 August but, since in the General Roman Calendar that date is now occupied by the memorial of Saint Maximilian Kolbe, Saint Fachtna is now venerated, even in the Diocese of Ross, on 13 August.

== Patronage ==
St. Fachtna is the Patron Saint of the Diocese of Ross, the cathedral of which is dedicated to him.
