= Boetius MacEgan =

Irish bishop of Ross

Boetius MacEgan (Irish: Baothnalach Mac Aodhagáin; died May 1650) was a 17th-century Irish Roman Catholic Bishop of Ross. Born in County Cork, MacEgan was associated with the Irish Catholic Confederation (also known as the Confederation of Kilkenny) and was killed during the Cromwellian invasion of Ireland.

== Early life and clerical career ==
MacEgan was born (possibly c. 1600) in the barony of Duhallow in north-west County Cork and educated in France and Spain. He returned to his native Munster as a Franciscan friar in the 1630s and was promoted to several positions of importance in the Franciscan order.

== Support the Irish Catholic Confederation ==
MacEgan was an enthusiastic supporter of the Confederation of Kilkenny, which controlled much of Ireland following the 1641 uprising.

In 1645, a new papal nuncio, Giovanni Battista Rinuccini, landed in Ireland with arms and funds to support the rebellion and befriended MacEgan. Rinuccini appointed MacEgan chaplain general of the Ulster forces. In this capacity, MacEgan accompanied the Confederation forces on a number of campaigns and was present at several victories, including the Battle of Benburb in 1646.

In 1646, Rinuccini proposed MacEgan as bishop of Ross and he was consecrated at Waterford in 1648. It is unlikely that he ever gained access to his see, which remained under Protestant control.

On Cromwell's landing in 1649, MacEgan became active in rallying the Confederation forces and organising defensive measures. He then joined David Roche's force of untrained men who were intending to relieve the siege of Clonmel. By late 1649, MacEgan had reportedly been "harassed by the royalists and appears to have spent late 1649 in hiding in the Kerry mountains".

== Capture and death ==
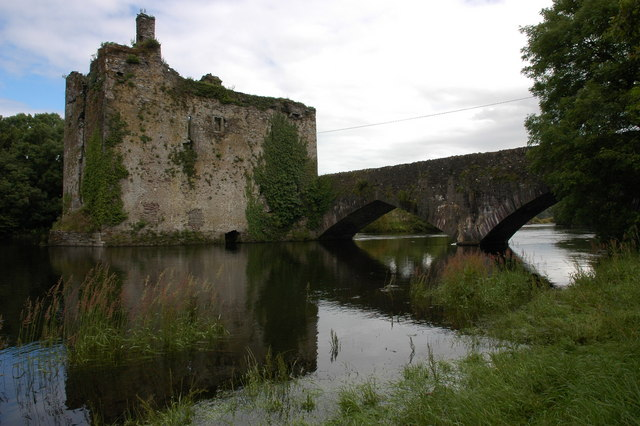
Carrigadrohid Castle, the site of MacEgan's death

At the Battle of Macroom, in May 1650, Roche's Confederate forces were intercepted by the seasoned cavalry of Roger Boyle, 1st Baron Broghill and put to flight near Macroom. MacEgan himself was captured and taken the following day to the walls of Carrigadrohid castle, which was occupied by Confederation forces, and told to call on them to surrender. He chose instead to exhort them to hold on and as a result was hanged from a nearby tree. The garrison surrendered shortly afterwards.

While local tradition states that MacEgan's body was buried in the local churchyard at Aghinagh, some sources suggested that his remains were "removed subsequently by his friends".
