= William Fitzgerald (bishop of Ross) =

Roman-catholic bishop

William Fitzgerald (b Imogeela 19 December 1832; d Cobh 24 November 1896) was an Irish Roman Catholic Bishop.

Fitzgerald was educated at Le Collège des Irlandais, Paris. He was ordained priest on 19 September 1857 and joined the staff of St Colman's College, Fermoy. He was Bishop of Ross from 1877 until his death.

== Bibliography ==
- Fryde, E. B.; Greenway, D. E.; Porter, S.; Roy, I., eds. (1986). Handbook of British Chronology (3rd, reprinted 2003 ed.). Cambridge: Cambridge University Press. ISBN 0-521-56350-X.
- Moody, T. W.; Martin, F. X.; Byrne, F. J., eds. (1984). Maps, Genealogies, Lists: A Companion to Irish History, Part II. New History of Ireland. Vol. 9. Oxford: Oxford University Press. ISBN 0-19-821745-5.
