= Micheal O'Hea =

Roman-catholic bishop

Micheal O'Hea (12 August 1808 – 18 December 1876) was a 19th-century Irish Roman Catholic bishop.

Born in Rosscarbery, County Cork, he was educated at the Irish College in Paris. He was ordained a priest in September 1833. He served curacies in Timoleague, Castlelyons, Kilworth, Kanturk, Rathcormac and Conna. He was parish priest at Rosscarberry from 1850 to 1858; and Bishop of Ross from 1858 until his death. He died in Skibbereen.

== Sources ==
- Fryde, E. B.; Greenway, D. E.; Porter, S.; Roy, I., eds. (1986). Handbook of British Chronology (3rd, reprinted 2003 ed.). Cambridge: Cambridge University Press. ISBN 0-521-56350-X.
- Moody, T. W.; Martin, F. X.; Byrne, F. J., eds. (1984). Maps, Genealogies, Lists: A Companion to Irish History, Part II. A New History of Ireland. Vol. IX. Oxford: Oxford University Press. ISBN 0-19-821745-5.
