= Dominic Tirrey =

Dominic Tirrey, a Chaplain to Henry VIII was Bishop of Cork and Cloyne from 1536 to 1557 despite the appointment being opposed by Pope Paul III.
