= Diocese of Cork =

Roman Catholic diocese in Ireland

The Diocese of Cork was established in the seventh century. The diocese of Cork was one of the twenty-four dioceses established at the Synod of Rathbreasail on an ancient bishopric founded by Saint Finbarr in the sixth-century. On 30 July 1326, Pope John XXII, on the petition of King Edward II of England, issued a papal bull for the union of the bishoprics of Cork and Cloyne, the union to take effect on the death of either bishop. The union should have taken effect on the death of Philip of Slane in 1327, however, bishops were still appointed to each separate bishopric. The union eventually took place with Jordan Purcell appointed bishop of the united see of Cork and Cloyne in 1429.

In the Roman Catholic Church, the diocese was united with that of Ross on 19 April 1958 to form the Roman Catholic Diocese of Cork and Ross. In the Church of Ireland, the diocese is part of the United Dioceses of Cork, Cloyne and Ross.
