= John Edmund de Courcy =

Late medieval Irish bishop

John Edmund de Courcy OFM was an English Bishop in Ireland in the late 15th and early 16th centuries: he was Bishop of Clogher. He was appointed Bishop of Clogher on 14 June 1484; and Bishop of Ross on 26 September 1494, a position he resigned in 1517. He died on 14 March 1519.
