= Skid =

Skid or Skids may refer to:

- Skid, a type of pallet
- Glossary of bowling § Skid, the first phase of bowling ball motion, preceding the hook and roll phases
- Skid (aerodynamics), an outward side-slip in an aircraft turn
- Skid (automobile), an automobile handling condition where one or more tires are slipping relative to the road
- Skid, a sled runner
- Skids, vehicles with continuous track
- Skids, or skid loaders, a vehicle
- Skids, a nautical term for slipway
- Modular process skid, an engineered frame for equipment
- Skid, alias for script kiddie

== Comics, games and amusements ==
- Skids (character), character in Marvel-published comics
- Skids (Transformers), several fictional robot superhero characters in the Transformers media franchise
- Skid, a type of amusement ride

== Music ==
- Skid (album), 1970, by Skid Row
- Skids (band), a Scottish band
  - Skids (EP) a 1977 EP by the Scottish band

== See also ==
- Skidder, a vehicle used in a logging operation for pulling cut trees out of a forest in a process called "skidding"
- Skidding (forestry), in logging, transporting felled trees from the felling site to a temporary dumping site
- Skydance Corporation, American media conglomerate with the stock ticker "SKYD"
