= John Sleyne =

Irish Roman Catholic prelate (c. 1638 – 1712)

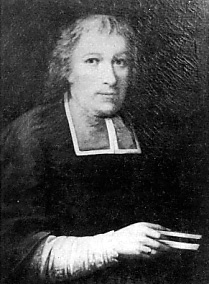
John Sleyne, Bishop of Cork and Cloyne

John Baptist Sleyne (Irish: Seán Baisteach Mac Sleimhne; c. 1638 – 16 February 1712) was Roman Catholic Bishop of Cork and Cloyne and Apostolic Administrator of the diocese of Ross, who was an enthusiastic patron of the Gaelic language and culture, and an advocate of the severely repressed Roman Catholic population, in Ireland during the early period of the Penal Laws. He was one of only two bishops to minister in Ireland at the end of the 17th century. Sleyne was very learned in languages and moral theology, and had traveled widely. He was known to and had interactions with kings, queens, popes and wider cultural and religious establishment throughout Ireland and Europe. Because Sleyne "remain[ed] in the kingdom contrary to the [penal] law", of the time, he went into hiding. He was eventually brought before the courts in 1698 and spent five years in prison in Cork Gaol. During his time as Bishop, both as fugitive and prisoner, Sleyne ordained many priests (estimated to be 38) and consecrated several bishops in Ireland. He was eventually exiled to Portugal, on 11 February 1703, where he was given shelter in the Irish Dominican Convento do Bom Sucesso, Lisbon. He died in Portugal on 16 February 1712, aged 74 years and is buried at the altar of the Sacred Heart in the Church of Nossa Senhora do Bom Sucesso.

There are many references to Sleyne throughout documents dating from the late 17th and early 18th centuries. Sleyne was sometimes referred to as Joannes Baptiste Mac Sleyne in the Irish college at Sorbonne, as Monsignor Giovanni Batista Sleyne in Rome, as João Baptista Sleyne in Portugal or as John Slyne in the records of the Grand Jury in his native Cork. In Gaelic literature, Sleyne was referred to as Eoin Baiste Mac Sleighne sometimes spelt as Mac Sleidhne. The molded capitals, at the top of the internal columns of St Colman's Cathedral of Cobh refer to him as Bishop Sliney.

The portrait of Bishop Sleyne, originally held at St. Isidore’s (the church of the Irish Franciscans, Rome) and now held at the [Cork and Ross Diocesan archives, is thought to be the oldest portrait in existence of any Catholic Bishop of Cork.

== Early years, family and townland ==
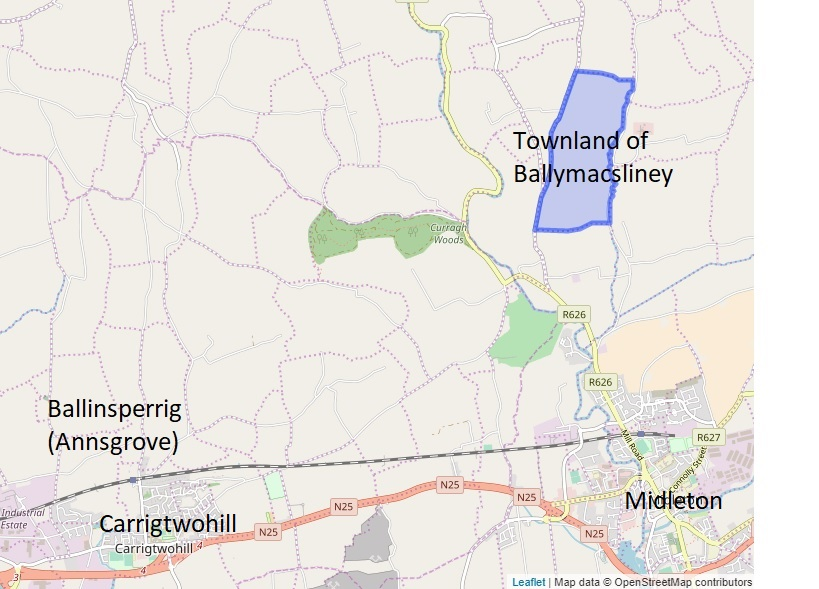
Townland of Ballymacsliney

Little is known about Sleyne's early life and family other than that he was born, in c. 1638, to John Sleyne in Ballymacsliney, Co. Cork and had two brothers and four sisters. (According to naming conventions of the 18th century, since both he and his father were both called John, he would likely have been the third eldest son in the family).

There are a number of candidates for location of the Ballymacsliney. Firstly, there is a townland of Ballymacsliney (Baile Mhic Shleimhne) near Midleton, Co. Cork that appears in the Down Survey (most probably misspelt) as BallmcGlinny within the Parish of Templencurrigg and the Barony of Barrimore. The landowner of the Barony of Barrimore was shown as Barry, David Fitz-David earl of Barrymore (Protestant) in both 1641 and 1670. (The intention of the Down survey was to measure out land held by Catholic Irish, that would then be forfeited and used to compensate English Merchant Adventurers and soldiers, for their support in the Cromwellian conquest of Ireland.) Secondly, there is also a town called Ballymacsliney, about 12 miles from Limerick. However, since Sleyne is mainly associated with Cork and in particular, East Cork, this could be discounted as being his townland. Thirdly, the name Ballymacsliney was applied to part of Maytown in Ballintemple parish, which was in the possession of the Mac Sleyne family. Records from 1616 and 1634 show that John Sleyne (probably Sleyne's father) held a Burgage at Cloyne, This suggests quite strongly that it is this latter third Ballymacsliney from which Sleyne came.

Sleyne's ancestors were of the FitzStephen family that had settled in the south east of Ireland after the Norman conquests (1170). Dominic O'Daly (sometimes called Donal or Daniel of the Rosary) stated in his Relatio Geraldinorum that "Robertus Stephani, rater uterinus Mauritii filii Geraldi Magni, et germanus rater Regis Angliae a quo originem Stephensons ducunt, et Clann tSleighne omnes". Robert Fitzstephen (son of Stephen of Cardigan, and Nest ferch Rhys) was the first Anglo-Norman to invade Ireland, who along with Milo de Cogan, was granted 700'000 acres of land in Munster (about one third the area of Cork County) as compensation for his participation in the invasion. Fitzstephen claimed the (ancient) region of Olethan to the east of Cork city. In 1192, both Fitzstephen's illegitimate son Ralph Fitzstephen and Milo de Cogan were ambushed and killed near Imokilly, County Cork. Upon his death, Fitzstephen's lands fell to Raymond (le Gros) de Carew, his nephew and heir. Because de Carew died without legal issue (1198), the Fitzstephen's lands fell to Fitzstephen's half-sister's sons, Philip de Barry. De Barry's descendants thus became one of the largest landowners in the region and were created Earls of Barrymore in 1628 until their ultimate extinction in 1823. MacCotter suggests that Sleyne's family was descended, not from Robert FitzStephen, but his half-brother, William le Walys, who had accompanied him to Ireland. The Le Walys family took up residence in Rostellan in the late 12th century.

After the murder in 1333 of the Great Earl of Ulster, the third earl William de Burgo, and the subsequent decrease of English power in Ireland, the FitzStephen family, like most notable Anglo-Norman families of Munster and Connaught, became more and more Hibernicised. In a fashion, they became Hiberniores Hibernis ipsis or 'more Irish than the Irish themselves'. Anglo-Norman families spoke the Irish language, and assumed surnames like those of the Irish, by prefixing the word Mac (Gaelic for Son of, equivalent Old French fils or Fitz) to the Christian names of their progenitors. For instance, the De Burgos, in Connaught, assumed the name Mac William from their progenitor, William Fitz-Adelm De Burgo, while the Barrys of Cork took the surname of Mac Adam. Why the O' prefix (Irish meaning descendant) was not adopted is not clear. Similarly, the le Walys family of Rostellan took the patronym Mac Sleyney, thereby suggesting the existence of an eponym Sleyney le Walys (?). MacCotter notes 'James fitz Garrett Sleyney alias Stephenson, chief of his name in Imokellye' in 1554, which makes a connection between the name Sleyney and a person named Stephen (Sleimhne) who lived at a time much later than Robert Fitzstephen. Sleimhne was a rare Irish form of the Norman-French name Estievne (Stephen) brought to Ireland in the 12th century, other Irish forms being Stiabhna, Sdíomnha, Stiana, and Steimhín. In Mac Sleimne, the 'm' is an aspirated consonant denoted by a séimhiú or dot over the 'm' in Gaelic script or by letter 'h' following the 'm' in Latin script (that is Mac Sleimhne). 'h' was not a distinct letter in the Gaelic alphabet. Mac Sleimhne is used interchangeable with Mac Sleidhne, Mac Sleibhne, or Mac Sleighne (As a translation for the modern surnames Slyne etc.). The slender consonant 'gh' in Mac Sleighne or 'dh' in Mac Sleidhne is pronounced similar to the English 'y' sound, The slender consonant 'bh' in Mac Sleibhne or 'mh' in Mac Sleimhne is pronounced similar to the English 'v' sound. There are a number of references to Sleyne's ancestry (Mac Sleyney or Mac Sleighne as having derived from Rostellan, Cloyne, East Cork and CastleMacSleyney (?) O'Donnchadha writes "Is ag Mac Sleighne do bln Ros Stiallain agus Caislean Mic Sleighne, agus iomad d’aitibh eile i nlbh MoCoille, gur hionnarbadh iad le foirneart Gearaltach". The MacSleyney family held an estate at Rostellan, in Cloyne, composed of 1 carucate of plowland (120 acres), and 40 acres of woods at Cuilbane, when it was sold to John FitzEdmond Fitzgerald in 1565. We read that "In 1565, Gerald Fitz James McSleyney, Captain of his nation in Imokilly and true Lord of Rostellan, sold unto John FitzEdmond James de Geraldinis his manor of Rosteilan." The same Gerald MacSleyney (1568) and another David MacSleyney (1584) are mentioned among the County Cork Elizabethan pardons of the late 16th century. MacCotter refers to the Caislean Mhic Sleighne towerhouse at Rostellan.

Sleyne had two nephews, with surnames Slyne, each of whom was a priest during the early Penal times. It is not known if they were cousins or brothers of each other. One nephew, John Slyne was later Parish Priest of South Parish, Cork from 1752 until his death on 16 June 1759. He lived at Cove Lane, which is now Douglas Street in Cork. The second nephew, Bartholomew Slyne (B.Law), was enrolled as "priest of the province of Munster" at College Des Lombards community of Irish priests and seminarians in Paris and on 13 January 1723, was assigned the role of steward of a period of 2 years. Both nephews were imprisoned in Cork Gaol for reasons which will become apparent below. It is also reported that Sleyne had two nephews or cousins residing in Lisbon by the names of John and Mathew de Nort. (Could these be pseudonyms for his two nephews John and Bartholomew?)

== Religious education in Sorbonne and early career ==
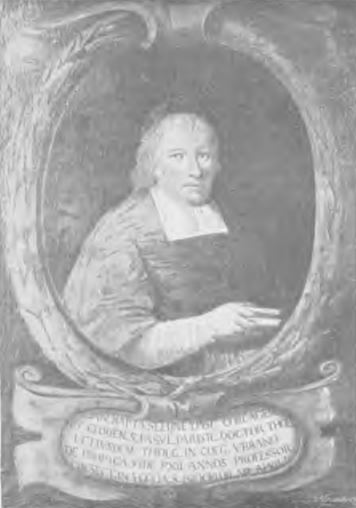
John Sleyne, a later copy of the original copy at St. Isidores. Brought to the Franciscan Convent, Dublin in 1870.

Sleyne was educated at the Sorbonne, Paris where he received a Master of Arts (1661), a Bachelor in Theology (1665) and a Doctorate of Divinity (1670), during which time, he became professor at the Sorbonne. At the age of 24, Sleyne was ordained priest by Andrew Lynch, bishop of Kilfenora (1647–1681) at Rouen on 27 Mar. 1663, by special privilege of Apostolic Indult because of his youth (assumed to be 23 years]). Sleyne returned to his native diocese of Cloyne where he was elected protonotary and dean of the cathedral. He later was made Vicar General of Killaloe by John O’Malony II, bishop of Killaloe (1671–1689). He was a member of the Order of St. Augustine (O.S.A.) and was administrator in commendam and last Prior of Ballybeg Priory of St. Thomas à Becket, which had been founded by Phillip de Barry in 1229 for the Canons Regular of St. Augustine.

In 1676, Sleyne went to work at the Propaganda Fide (Congregation for the Propagation of the Faith) in Rome, through which he petitioned for an appointment to the vacant diocese of Kerry (Ardfert). He was anxious to come "to the aid of the afflicted Catholics of Ireland". In Rome, Sleyne received high profile appointments, namely Professor of Moral Theology in the College of Propaganda Fide for 12 years, as spiritual director of the Ursuline nuns and as Roman agent for Peter Creagh, bishop of Cork and Cloyne (1676–1693). Some materials relating to Sleyne's time in the College Of Propaganda Fide, are held at the Franciscan Library, Killiney, Dublin. These were moved there from St Isidore's in 1873, when Rome was under threat of capture and destruction by the newly created Italian government.

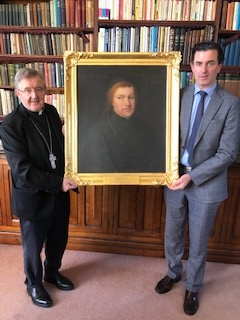
Bishop Crean accepting a portrait of his predecessor Bishop John Sleyne from Tadhg Dorgan, BL, which has been given to the Diocese on permanent loan by the Dorgan family of Mourne Abbey. November 2022.

In 2022, a portrait of a younger John Sleyne was presented by Taghg Doran on permanent loan to Cloyne Catholic Diocese. Before coming into private ownership, the 300-year-old portrait, was, for many years, held at Holy Cross Seminary, Clonliffe Dublin. It is believed that this painting is one of the oldest portraits in existence of an Irish Bishop, and is described by the current Bishop Crean as a welcome contribution to collection of Cloyne Diocese.

== Fugitive during penal times ==
In 1693, James II of Great Britain exercised his royal prerogative of naming Catholic Bishops in Ireland, and nominated Sleyne to the united dioceses of Cork and Cloyne. With the departure of Bishop Peter Creagh to Dublin, Sleyne was made bishop of Cork and Cloyne by Pope Innocent XII (1691–1700), who held Sleyne in high regard for both his virtue and zeal. Sleyne was consecrated at St. Isidore’s (the church of the Irish Franciscans, Rome) on 18 April 1693 by Cardinal Toussaint de Forbin de Janson (1631–1713), being then about 56 years of age. Principle co-Consecrators were Bishop Giuseppe Felice Barlacci and Bishop Philip Michael Ellis. On 24 October 1693, after a meeting with Sleyne in Rome, Cardinal Secretary of State, Fabrizio Spada, requested of the Apostolic Internuncio to Belgium, Giulio Cardinal Piazza, to make representations to William Prince of Orange, so that Sleyne would be able to travel to his diocese without molestation. On 5 December 1693, he was appointed Apostolic Administrator of Ross diocese.

In early 1694, Sleyne successfully managed to return to Ireland, to commence his episcopal duties. The Ireland that Sleyne came back to as Bishop had been drawn into the wider conflict between Protestant and Catholic lines across Europe. The Catholic James II had acceded to the throne of Britain with the intention of replacing the Protestant establishments with Catholic ones. In response, the army of the Protestant William of Orange fought and overcame James II’s forces at the Battle of the Boyne (1690) and at the Battle of Aughrim (1691). Following James II’s death, the Pope and the Kings of France (Louise XIV) and Spain recognised his son as James III (the Pretender), heir to the English throne. This increased the threat of invasion of Ireland from French or Spanish privateers in support of James III, whose supporters were known as Jacobites. For instance, in 1708, there was the Planned French invasion of Britain with the support of Scottish Jacobites, but which was called off prior to landing. The papal recognition of the Stuart Catholic line, and the reciprocal Stuart nominations of Irish catholic bishops which continued until the death of James III in 1766, kept the suspicion alive that Catholic clergy were complicit in the Jacobite cause. The Penal Laws, passed in Ireland between 1691 and 1728, had the deliberate objective of seriously restricting the rights of the Catholic majority, for instance it would soon be against the law for Catholics to live or work in towns such as Cork, Limerick, and Galway. The Act of Abjuration (1701) required priests to swear an oath denying James III "any right or title whatsoever to the Crown of these realms" and affirming the Protestant line of succession. Many clergy in Ireland refused to take the oath and thus were in conflict with the law. The Banishment Act (1697) required that all bishops of the Roman Catholic Church to be expelled from Ireland by 1 May 1698, so as to protect the official state church, the Church of Ireland.

Prior to the Banishment Act, there were 25 Roman Catholic dioceses in Ireland, of which sixteen had bishops, the remaining nine were held in administration. Eight of these bishops obeyed the Act and left Ireland, which apart from Sleyne, also included – Edward Comerford (Cashel), Patrick Donnelly (Dromore), Michael Rossiter (Ferns), John Dempsey (Kildare), William Dalton (Ossory), Richard Piers (Waterford & Lismore), Maurice Donnellan (Clonfert). Of these, three were bishops-elect and did not take up duties, and three were incapacitated. This meant that only two bishops actively performed their functions in those years. Sleyne was one of them, the other being Maurice Donnellan, bishop of Clonfert. Donnellan was arrested, but was liberated in a fracas involving a crowd of more than 300 Catholics.

Sleyne was amongst a number of Catholic clergy afforded protection by Sir James Fitz Edmund Cotter, for nearly three years at his estate in Ballinsperrig (now Annsgrove), near Carrigtwohill, Co. Cork. Cotter, a Royalist, Jacobite, Governor of the City of Cork and Governor of Montserrat, was noted for tracking down and executing some of those responsible for the execution of Charles I (the regicide John Lisle), and for commanding Jacobite cavalry regiments in Munster prior to the Treaty of Limerick. While he had a long-term lease on his Ballinsperrig estate from the Earl of Barrymore, his royal pension allowed him to buy tracts of land in Cork, including Great Island. His fairness to Protestants landowning neighbours up to then, helped Cotter retain his properties against numerous legal challenges, after James II fled the country. Churchmen from Munster and from other provinces visited Ballinsperrig on a daily basis (ionas go mbiodh caibidil agus coimhthionoil ghinerealta aco a ccuirt Bhaile na Speire), where Sleyne conducted Chapter and general assemblies. Bishop Sleyne was godfather to Sir James’ eldest son, Seamus Óg MacCoitir, to whom Domhnall Ó Colmáin dedicated his Irish text Párliament na mBan. and who was seen as a potential leader of the repressed Catholics of Munster in the early years of the Penal Laws. Unfortunately, the fortunes of the Cotter Family and its estate went into decline when MacCoitir was convicted of murder and hanged in 1720. Conspiracy theories, however, have abounded about the veracity of the crime and the fairness of the verdict, because the wife of the Lord Lieutenant of Ireland at the time of MacCoiter's trial was none other than the granddaughter of John Lisle. The same John Lisle whom MacCoitir's father had help to execute.

Despite being under threat of imprisonment and deportation, Sleyne travelled widely throughout Cork and Munster exercising episcopal duties. On 7 July 1697, he is reported as conducting confirmations in the parish of the Blessed Virgin Mary in Limerick. It is also reported that Sleyne conducted ordinations at Cork, Carrigtwohill and Blarney between 1694 and 1701.

== Imprisonment in Cork Gaol ==
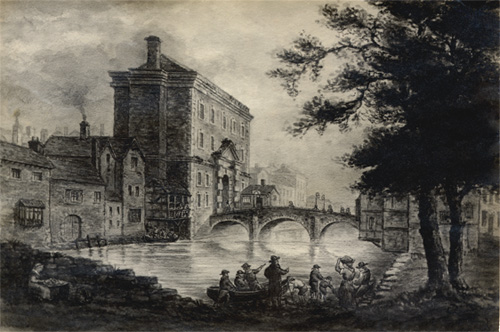
Gaol at South Gate Bridge, Cork, c.18th century (Nathaniel Grogan)

A presentment from the grand jury of the City and County of Cork, dated April 1698, found that "P. Murrough, titular Vicar-General and John Slyne (sic), titular Bishop of Corke, remain[ed] still in this kingdom, exercising ecclesiastical jurisdiction, contrary to" the Banishment Act. As a result, in a letter he wrote to Cardinal Toussaint de Forbin-Janson "God at last permitted that I should he taken prisoner in my episcopal city". Sleyne was imprisoned, pending immediate deportation, in Cork Gaol. (Cork Gaol was at that time located at South Gate Bridge entrance to the city of Cork. The facility at the South Gate bridge subsequently became the debtors' prison in 1712, with North Gate bridge becoming the location of Cork Gaol thereafter). Sleyne was to be kept "in such rigorous confinement that he was not permitted to converse with any one".

Surprisingly, Sleyne was still in Cork gaol nearly three years later without being deported and "some Catholics found means to penetrate into his prison, and he exerted his sacred ministry as best he could". It was said "that he was celebrating mass and worse still ordaining priests in gaol". Domhnall O'Colmain in Parliament Na mBan recounts that he was attended by a Cailín aimsire (maidservant), Máire Inghean Bháitéir Laighleis, who "bound herself by an oath to remain a black-veiled nun for as long as she lived" and to act as Sleyne's servant until "God deigned to send him from her to Portugal". The poet Eoghan O'Caoimh stated that he received Ola na Cásca from Sleyne "gacha bliadhain an feadh do bhí sé a ngéibhinn a gCorcaigh". This lack of security was symptomatic of what John Whatey complained in 1703, that prisoners such as Sleyne could "by interest of their gaolers ... easily obtain leave to teach as school masters and have their daily Mass, and thereby all desired opportunity of ordaining others".

Even more surprisingly, after nearly two further years, a second presentment from the grand jury of the City and County of Cork, dated 27 July 1702, found that "John Slyne (sic), titular Bishop of Corke, remain[ed] still in this kingdom, exercising ecclesiastical jurisdiction, contrary to this late Act". This was brought to the attention of Joshua Dawson, the Under-secretary to the Chief Secretary for Irish Affairs at Dublin Castle. Apart from being a substantial estate owner (in and around what is now Dawson St. Dublin), Dawson was a zealous anti-Jacobite who had a key responsibility for implementing the regiment of the Penal Laws and had established an intricate web of spies, informants and priest-catchers operating in every major town and port and in Ireland and throughout Europe. This provided him with information on clergy that were still in Ireland or were travelling back to Ireland or were being trained in Irish Colleges such as Irish College of Louvain. Sleyne's own family had come to the attention of the notorious priest-catcher, Edward Tyrrell, when he gave testament that he "had taken [...] two young priests newly ordained reddy to goe for France with their papers and letters by name Slynes, nephews to the Popish Bishop of Corke who was lately transported out of Corke by law. They were committed by the Mayor of Corke to the Gaole". The occasion of Tyrrell's testament was his own trial on charges of Bigamy, for which he was found guilty and hanged at Gallows Hill near Baggot Street in Dublin. Much of Tyrrell's testament was later doubted by the Lord Chancellor Phipps who "could never find any other effect from his service than to get money from us".

On 8 August 1702, Dawson issued a letter to the Mayor of Cork conveying a warrant for "the transportation to Portugal of the titular Bishop of Cork". A Franciscan friar, Father Christopher Martin, who was imprisoned since 1698 in Limerick, was to be transferred to Cork to share imprisonment with Sleyne, and transported accordingly. A further five months later, Sleyne was still detained in Cork Gaol "on pretence of sickness great inability and weakness to undergoe a voyadge att sea". As for Martin, "it seems that friendly interests intervened on [his] behalf and secured his release".

The exact reasons are unclear for why Sleyne was detained in Cork Gaol for so long and had not been deported. Firstly, it could have been because of an underlying desire of some constitutional monarchists (Whigs) in the British establishment to prolong the detention of senior Catholic clergy such as Sleyne. However, this is unlikely given the considerably efforts spent by Dublin Castle to catch and expel every Catholic bishop other than Sleyne.

Secondly, Sleyne was fearful that he would be deported to "some Islands which he knows not", probably alluding to transportation into slavery in the Caribbean plantations, a fate suffered by many catholic clergy during the Cromwellian conquest of Ireland only 50 years earlier. Even as recently as 1691, Sleyne's predecessor as Bishop of Cork, Peter Creagh wrote that "twenty-five curates of my diocese ... were put in the stocks ... and it is believed ... will be sent to the Barbadoes and other islands of the West Indies to plant tobacco like the other slaves there". Sleyne had been using diplomatic channels to influence his eventual outcome, which up to the death of the death of William of Orange (William III of Great Britain) in 1702, relied on the offices of Apostolic Internuncio to Belgium, Giulio Cardinal Piazza. After William III's death, Sleyne now sought the intercession of Count Wratislaw, the Austrian ambassador to the court of William III's successor, Queen Anne, to ensure that, if he were exiled, it would be to a Catholic country on the continent of Europe. In his letter, Sleyne portrayed himself to be somewhat older (80) than he actually was (64) and emphasised the hardship he was suffering through "frequent pains of gout and the gravel". (Such painful and related diseases of the joints and kidneys are caused by inadequate excretion of urate in the blood, through a high-protein diet based on red meat.)

Thirdly, there appears to have been recurring mishaps in communications between Dublin Castle and authorities in Cork. The Church of Ireland Dean of Ross, Rowland Davies when "asked to forward to the castle all the particulars regarding the stay of Dr. Sleyne at Cork" claimed that he "never received the order for fresh examinations and other papers ... relating to the stay of the Titular Bishop of Cork in Ireland after the time prefixt by the Act of Parliament for his exportation".

Lastly, the Mayor of Cork had repeated difficulty in executing the order to deport Sleyne, and had failed to highlight this difficulty to Dublin Castle. This hints at a reluctance, on the part of the Mayor of Cork, for Sleyne to be expelled. A letter from Dawson to John Whiting, Mayor of Cork, on 9 January 1703, queried why "no account [was] ever been sent up of the execution of that order, or any reasons being given why the said bishop was not transported". In his reply, Whiting explained he had agreed with several ships to take the bishop on board, however they seemed to have been "forced to sea unawares". His predecessor, Alderman Dring, had received the orders, however, he couldn't find any ship that was going to Portugal. The result was that the bishop remained in Cork Gaol "in as bad a condition to be transported as formerly."

Lord Rochester, Lord Lieutenant of Ireland, considered the "reasons (of the Mayor of Cork) were very slender for not having done as he was directed" and that he should be more diligent in observing the orders of the secretary of Dublin Castle. On 9 February 1703, in obvious frustration, Joshua Dawson issued an order to the Mayor of Cork "that you cause the said Popish bishop to be put on board the first ship that shall be bound from Corke to Portugall" agreeing to pay the necessary shipping charge.

== Exile to Portugal ==
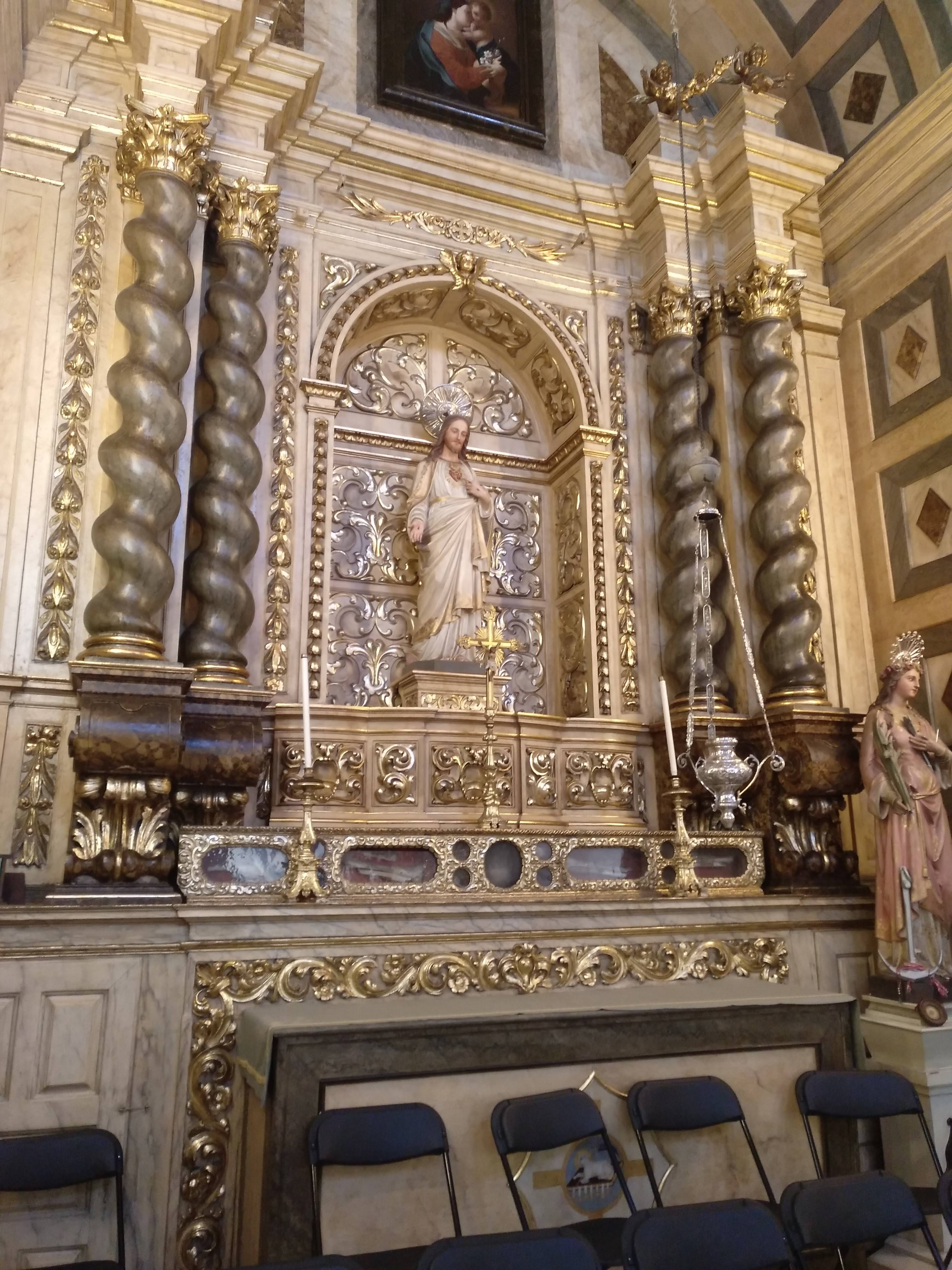
Altar of the Sacred Heart, Church of Nossa Senhora do Bom Sucesso. (2018)

Sleyne was exiled soon after, "the mayor and alderman of Corke having removed [him] from [his] bed by a troop of soldiers ... [and] compelled [him] to embark on a sudden in a little vessel that was sailing for Portugal", "in the sight of all the people". Even though Portugal was a significant Catholic country, it was not associated with the Jacobite cause. It was an ally of France at the start of the War of Spanish Succession, but switched to being an ally of England in 1703 on agreeing the Methuen Treaty in return for military and commercial co-operation.

Travelling on the same boat from Cove to Lisbon was John George, a "shipowner and merchant by wholesale " who was also fleeing persecution in Ireland. On 27 March 1703, following a rough sea journey, Sleyne wrote to Propaganda Fide announcing his arrival in Lisbon. The Irish Dominicans in Lisbon assumed responsibility for him and the Bom Successo community generously gave him hospitality in the chaplain's house on the grounds of the Convento do Bom Successo, for the duration of his time there. Since its inception in 1640, the Convento do Bom Sucesso had served as a place of Catholic learning and provided refuge for many fleeing religious persecution from Ireland. (Its importance has been recognised through the visits of modern day Presidents of the Republic of Ireland President Michael D. Higgins in 2015, Mary McAleese in 2002 and Mary Robinson in 1995).

Pope Clement XI addressed a letter to João V of Portugal (28 September 1709), assuring him of the truth of the information that Bishop Sleyne conveyed to him about the plight of Irish Catholics. The Pope recommended that Sleyne be deserving of all the support that could be given to him. João V of Portugal welcomed Sleyne to Portugal and awarded him financial assistance, part of which Sleyne used to defray the costs of the new Capella of Saint Patrick at Bom Successo. This Altar was dedicated to the Sacred Heart in 1891.

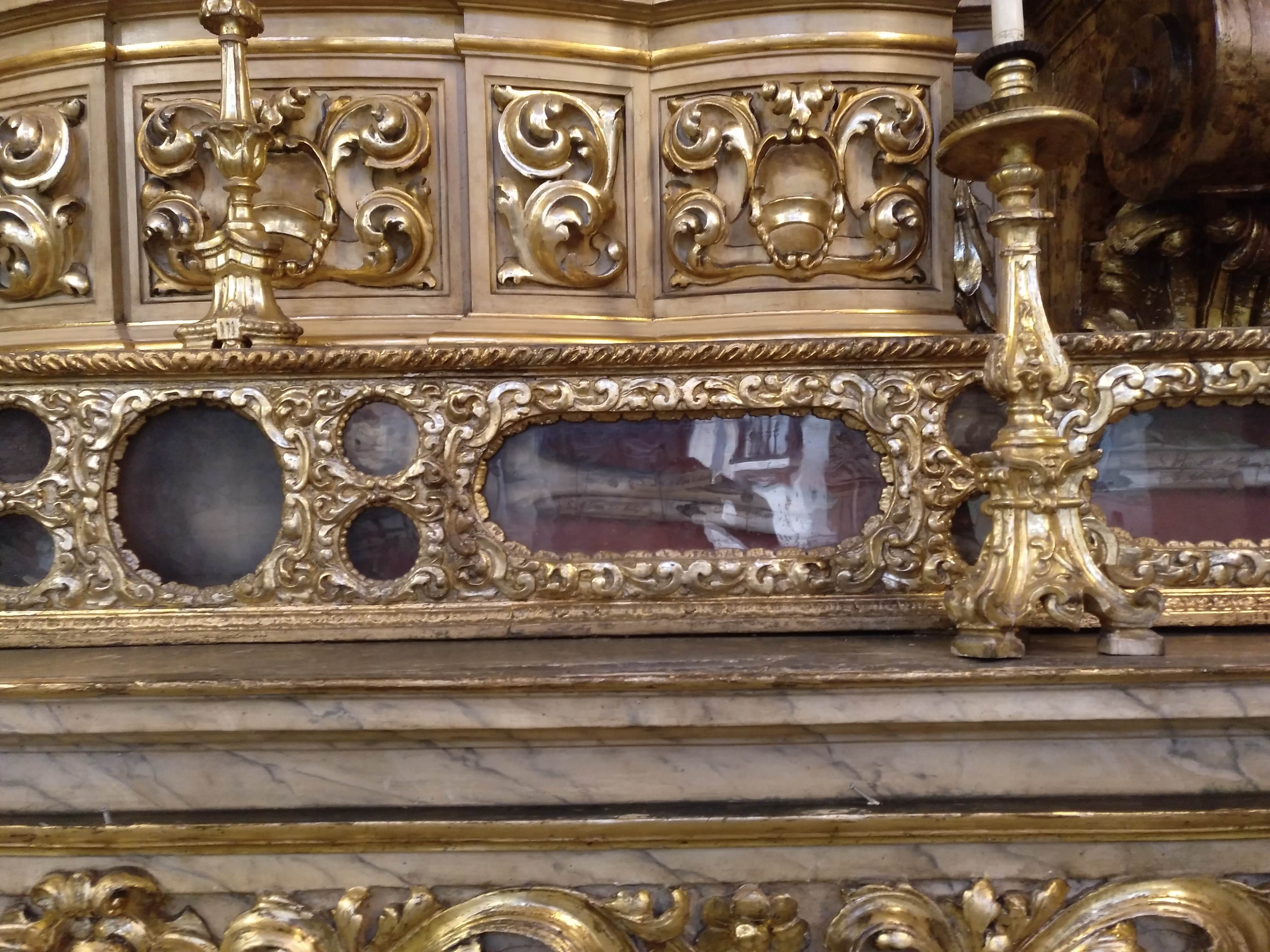
Relics at altar of Sacred Heart, Church of Nossa Senhora do Bom Sucesso. (2018)

Even in exile, Sleyne advanced the cause of the Roman Catholic people in Ireland, demanding of Cardinal Toussaint de Forbin-Janson the fullest powers possible for marriage dispensations needed by the bishops still in Ireland. He appointed two Vicars General to act as administrators of the dioceses in his absence and postulated in favour of Donough MacCarthy as his co-adjutant bishop when he resigned from his dioceses.

With regards to the other notable exile on the same boat as Bishop Sleyne, John George and his family, thrived in Lisbon, supported by the Irish community of Belém. He constructed a grand palace on Rua da Junqueira in the Santo Amaro area, that typified 18th-century Portuguese architecture. His descendant, Paulo Jorge, enhanced the family's reputation through the well regarded Carcavelos wine and is remembered in the area of Travessa de Paulo Jorge of Belém.

== Legacy in poetry and art ==
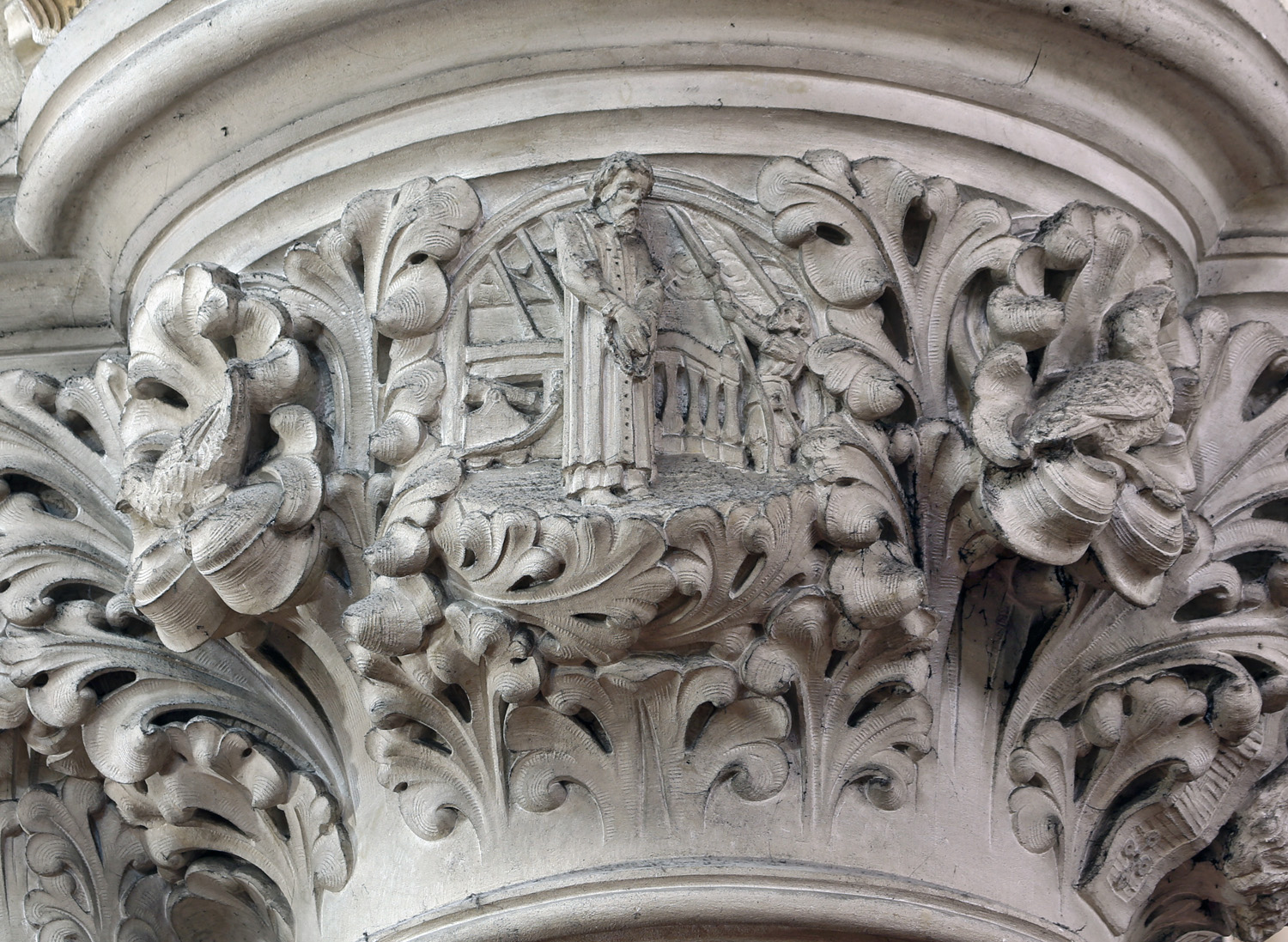
Relief of "Bishop Sliney sentenced to transportation from Cove to Lisbon". St. Colmans Cathedral, Cobh, Co. Cork.

Typical Anglo-Norman families such as Sleyne's, would have possessed resources to support Gaelic culture and language. Sleyne was among the literati clergy who had replaced the native ruling families as patrons of Sráid-éigse (Gaelic or Street poetry) in the second half of the seventeenth, and who believed that "gurb ionann caomhnú na Gaeilge and caomhnú an Chreidimh chaitlicí agus fós gurbh í an gheilge an chosaint ab fhearr ar an bProstastúnachas (the preservation of the Irish language and the preservation of the Catholic Faith is one of the most important defenses against Protestantism)". He himself was a patron and a collector of manuscripts and allegedly had every book he could find in South Munster translated to Irish at his own expense (nar fhaibh se aoin leabhar Gaoidheilge da bhfuair se Leath Mogha gan a cur uile da naithsgriobh air a chostas fein). He provided access to his library of Irish literature and verse to the Carrignavar Cuirt Eigse (literary circle) and others whose intent was to keep the love of Gaelic culture alive (fir éinn of Faithche na bhFilí), including Diarmuid Mac Sheáin Bhuí, Liam Mac Cairteáin an Dúna, Conchuir Ó Corbáin, Conchuir MacCairteáin, Joseph MacCairteáin and Domhnail Ó Colmain. Among his library was a collection of poems copied for him by Conchubair Ó Corbain, a copy of Seathrun Ceitinn's Tri Biorghaithe an Bhais, Eochairsciath an Aifrinn and Foras Feasa ar Eirinn. Others literati clergy who, like Sleyne, had studied in Paris included Bishops Tomas Deis of Meath, Padraig O' Donnghaile of Dromore, Seamas O'Gallchobhair of Raphoe and Sean O'Briain of Cloyne.

Sleyne was eulogised by Gaelic poets and scholars of the time. In Parliament Na mBan, the first prose work written in the Munster Dialect, Domhnall O'Colmain referred to the "godly prelate, the man who excelled all his contemporaries in knowledge and wisdom, and in high scholarship, piety, namely the angelic and noble Eoin Mac Sleighne, the soft-spoken, gentle bishop of Cork in Munster of Colman's Cloyne and of RosCarberry, who was imprisoned in the city of Cork". O'Colmain had been parish priest of Glounthane, St. Finbarrs and Knockraha parishes, who was well read in classical and scriptural literature. Another poet, writer and scholar, Conchúir Ó Corbáin, schoolmaster from Glanmire, thanked Sleyne for reviving the spirit of poetry and for his goodness which placed poets and writers forever in his debt. He wrote that "faith and culture were threatened until Sleyne's return salvaged and encouraged all". Dáibhí Ó Bruadair, one of the most significant Irish language poets of the 17th century, in Is tórmach ceatha welcomed Sleyne back to Ireland on his appointment as Roman Catholic bishop of Cork and Cloyne.

A reason to abandon deadly afflictions is the arrival of this sun in winter,
a time to numb the vitals of the meek, law-upholding devout one;
as the summer heat disperses the ice of November of the bitter weather,
this sun will put to flight the cold, the fever, the blackness and the gloom from hearts of clay

This poem, edited and translated by Liam P. Ó Murchú, is one of ten eulogies related to Sleyne, held in Boston College Gaelic Manuscript 5. Others include Dia do bheatha a thriath Chorcuighe (An tAthair Tadhg Ó Dála), A phlúr ne bhfear do theagasig diadhacht san Róimh (An tAthair Donnchadh Mac Cártha), Cré ne Rómha fa chómhuilt Chroíst as buan (An tAthair Conchubhar Ó Briain), Cruaidh an cás ne ttárla Banbha a bpéin (An tAthair Conchubhar Ó Briain), Mo bhrón mo dheacair an cealg so dhom shiorchrádha (Uilliam Mac Cairteáin), An méara san méid sin ag bagairt ar Eóin (Diarmuid Mac Cártha), Eóin do bhaisteadh as feasach a theacht don tír (Diarmuid Mac Cártha), Iomdha teist úghdar ar Eóin, A leabhair bhid thráth do dháil damh sult ar Fhiannaibh (Uilliam Mac Cairteáin).

An t-Athair Eoghan Ó Caoimh, parish priest of Doneraile, Co. Cork (1717 -1726), dedicated his manuscript Iomdhair Teist Ughdhair (Many Testimonies of Authors), now in held in Stonyhurst Jesuit College in Lancashire, England as follows "Father O'Caoimh to John Baptist Sleyne (Bishop of Cork in the years 1697–1702), before his imprisonment by the heretics of that time." Ó Caoimh, and sometimes with his son Art, had been employed by Sleyne to translate a Latin catechism into Irish and to make copies of his manuscripts, including Foras Feasa ar Eirinn, Trí Biorghaoithe an Bháis (Three shafts of death) and Eochairsgiath an Aifrinn (Key shield of the Mass). A common theme in Gaelic poetry of the time, was Sleyne's deportation and exile for example the poem from Conchubhar Ó Briain about Sleyne's exile. One composition from Ó Caoimh laments:

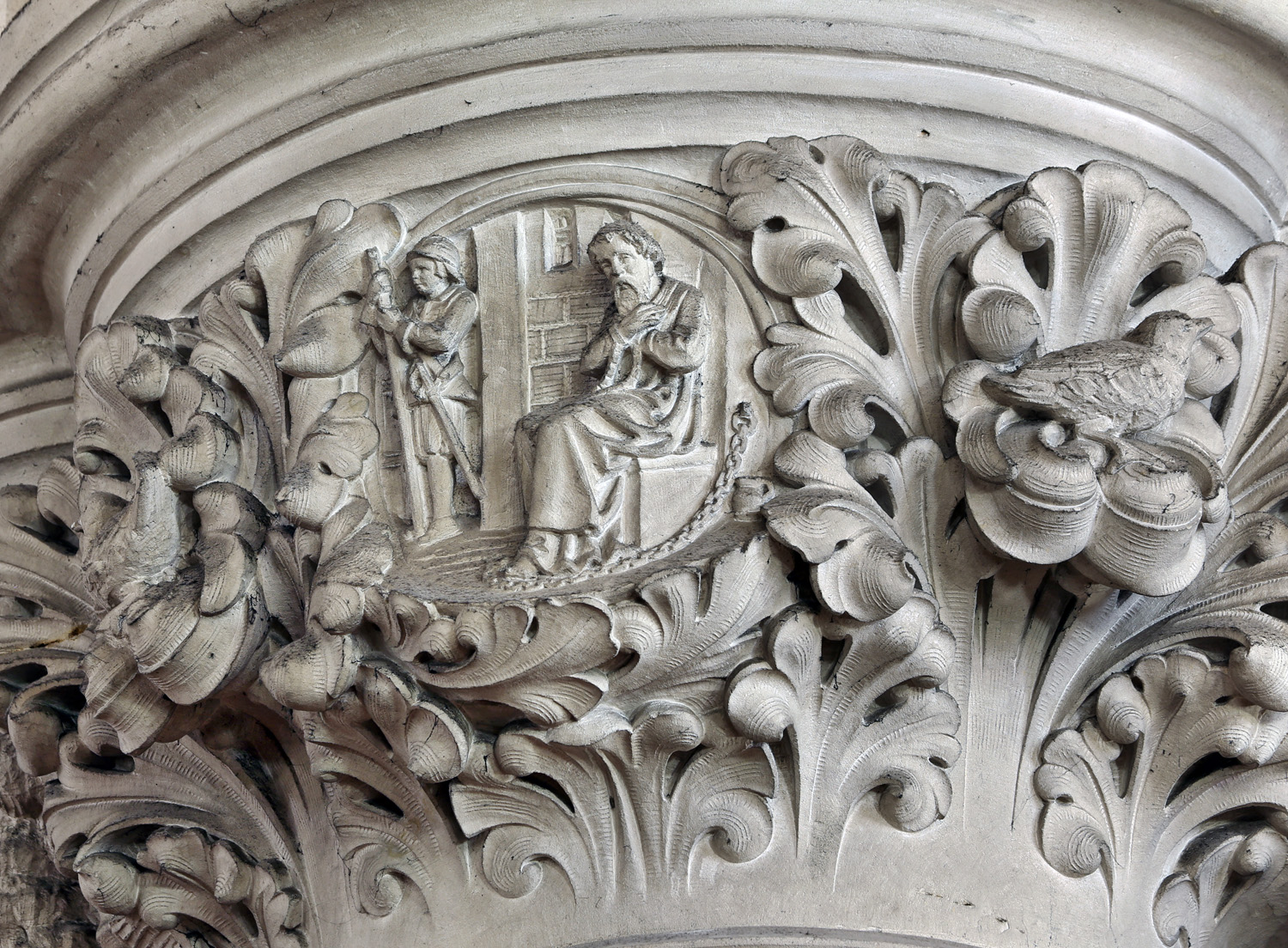
Relief of "Bishop Sliney imprisoned in Cork". St. Colmans Cathedral, Cobh, Co. Cork.

Eagarly would I write
If John were in Cork
Since he went to Portugal
I have no happiness at all

A second composition by Eoghan O'Caoimh entitled Mo Bhroin Mo Mhille mourns Sleyne's exile to Portugal:

I am now sorrowful that my light is ruined
The story I heard made me deserted and sad
My freedom ceased, my old repose was broken
John was put to sea from us at a certain time
My treasure and my love went together from me
The man I regarded most highly among the clergy
We are cold and have not enough of the warm stream
On the ocean swell he went away,
His select qualities in expert fields were known to me
And my voice quickly put them in a poem
To John I owed a song of mine
But, now, I suppose it will be thought of as flatten

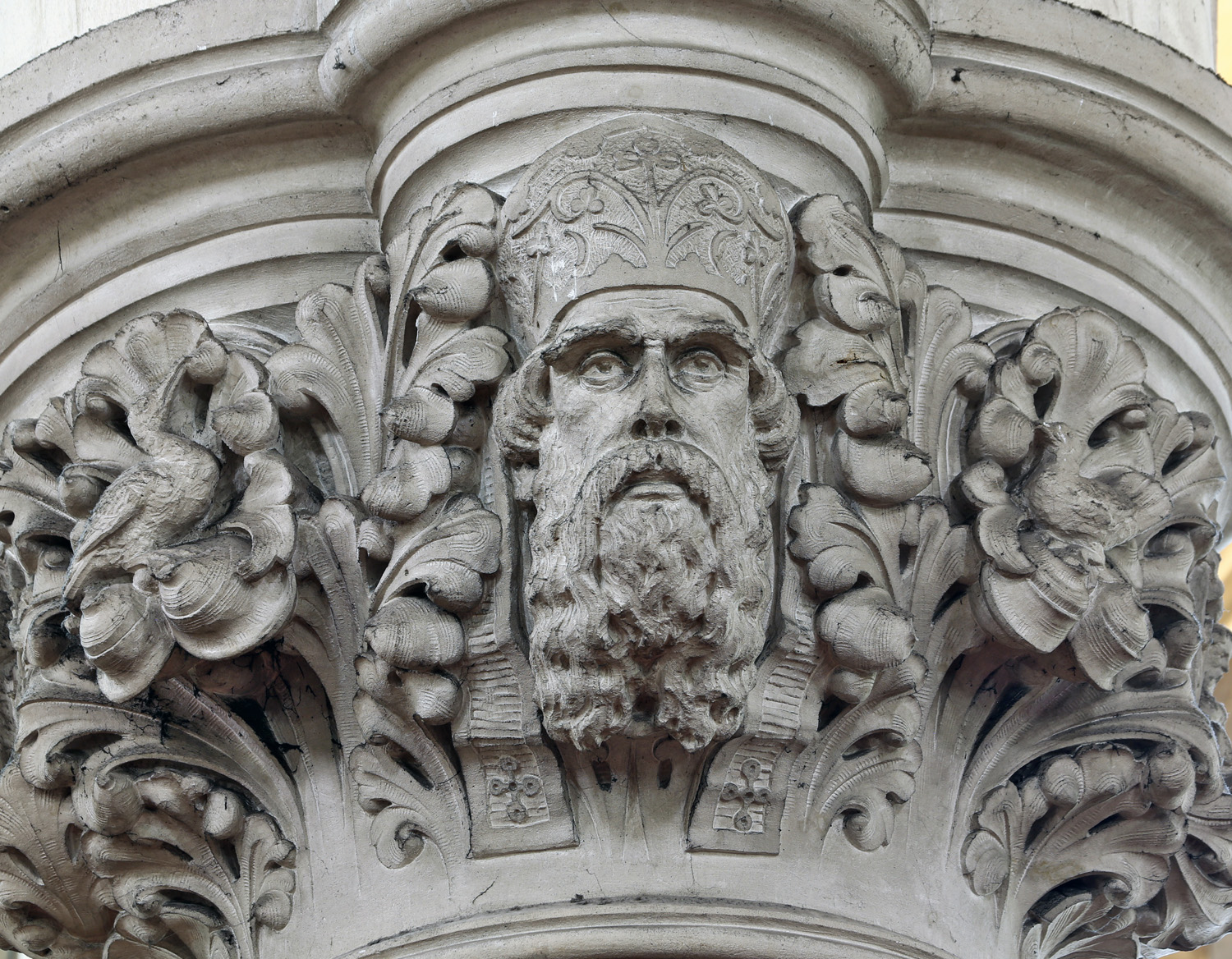
Relief of "Bishop Sliney". St. Colmans Cathedral, Cobh, Co. Cork.

Aodhagán Ó Rathaille, the last of the old Gaelic poets, wrote the verse When the Bishop of Cork was sent over the sea by the heretics in 1703.

My grief, my undoing now, my anguish to be related !
The bitter tidings I hear has made me tearful and troubled,
It has upset my mind, it has shattered my happiness and my rest,
The sending of John across the main from his by force.
My store, my treasure, he has taken from me all at once,
My iustice, my affection, my favourite among the clergy without harshness,
He was not content that I should lack the stream of refreshing generosity;
Since he is put in bondage beyond the main, woe is me !

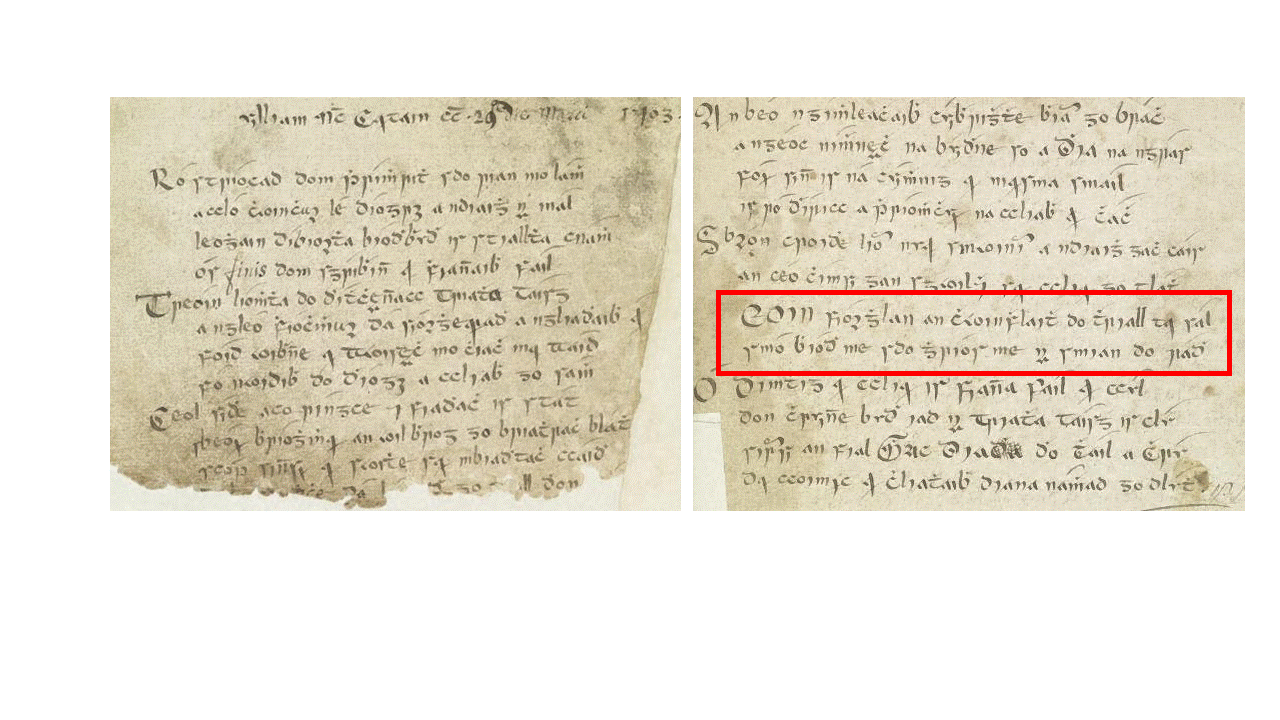
Eoin fiorghlan an chaoinfhlaith do thriall tar sal – Uilliam McCartain 29 March 1703 (LNE G114: 58–59)

Uilliam Mac Cartain, in Ró stríocad dom phrímhrith sdo rian mo lámh, wrote a lament for the plight of the clergy, in particular that of his patron an tEaspag Eoin Mac Sleighne.

Finally, Sleyne's learnedness in classical studies was recognised by another poet-priest Cornelius MacCurtin of Rathcooney (1692–1737):

A scholar in Latin they affirm,
accurate his understanding in Greek.
Greek he cultivated; he does not want
any traits of the nobleman and compositions of scholars.
There's no text in Irish or hard difficult lay,
which that man didn't expound in full for us.

== Consecrations and ordinations ==
Sleyne was responsible for the Ordination and consecration of many priests and bishops respectively, some of whom are list as follows:

Name	Consecration	Date	Location
Maurice Donnellan	Bishop	1695	Clonfert
William Daton	Bishop	1696	Ossory
Richard Piers	Bishop	1696	Waterford
Edward Commerford	Bishop	1697	Cashel, Tipperary
Patrick O'Donnelly	Bishop	1697	Dromore
Michael Rossiter	Bishop	1697	Ferns
Donough MacCarthy	Co-adjutator	1703	Cork and Cloyne

Name	Ordination	Date	Location
Manus Egan	Priest	1694	Blarney, Cork
Denis Conlean	Priest	1695	Tybroughney, Killkenny
Malachy Dulany	Priest	1695	Ossory
James Keogh	Priest	1695	Kilmastulla, Tipperary
John Brady	Priest	1697	Cork
William Balfe	Priest	1698	Scullogstown, Kildare
James Plunket	Priest	1701	Killeagh

== Final resting place ==
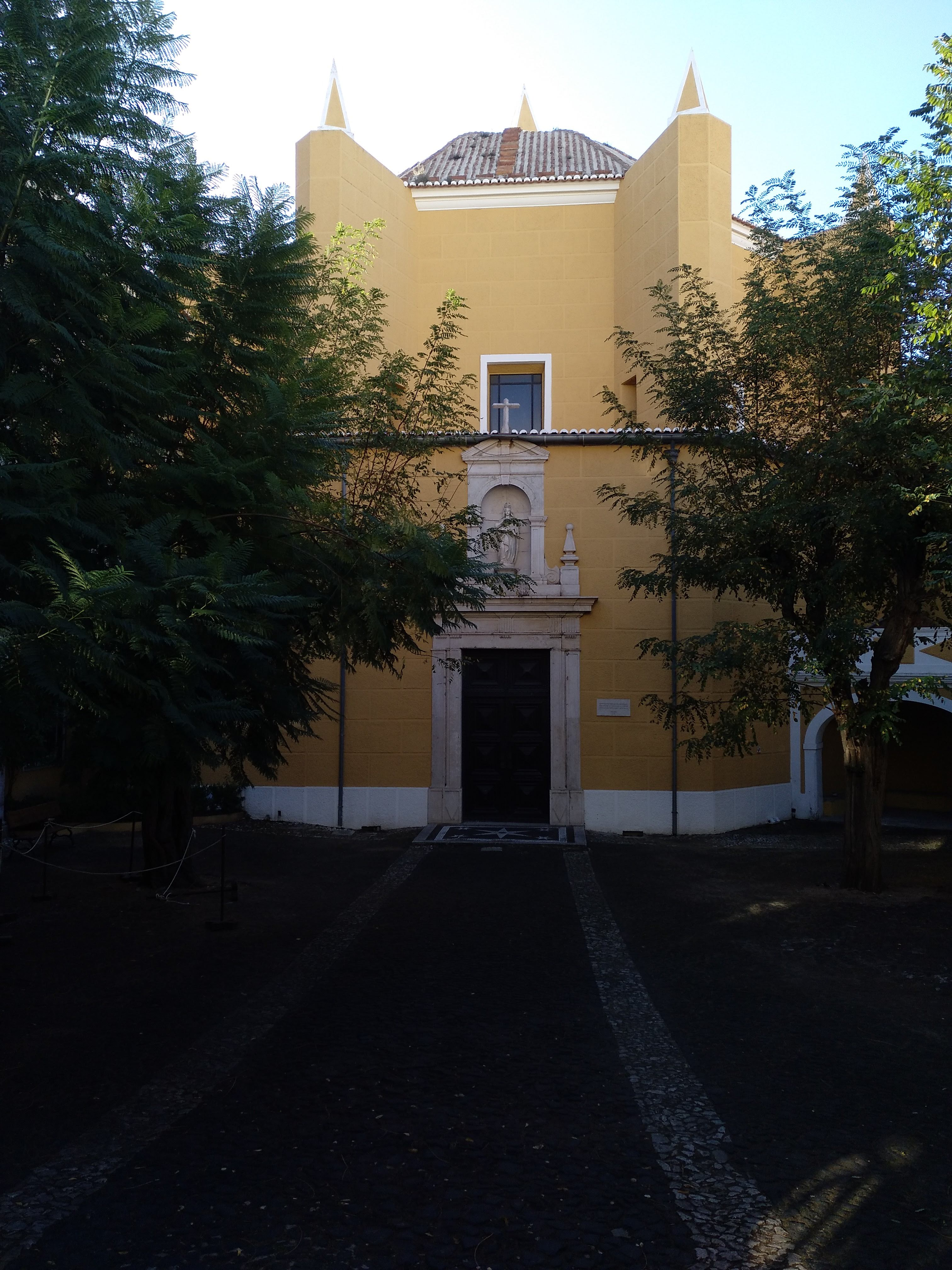
Church of Nossa Senhora do Bom Sucesso, Bélim, Lisbon. (2018)

Having been given refuge for nine years at the Irish Dominican Convento do Bom Sucesso, Sleyne died on 16 February 1712. He is buried in the Church of Nossa Senhora do Bom Sucesso at the altar which he had financially helped to decorate. Before he died, Sleyne had sought permission to return to Ireland, however his petition was refused by Queen Anne. Because he had resigned as Bishop on 22 January 1712, a month before he died, he then assumed the title Bishop Emeritus of Cork and Cloyne.

The Convent which was established in 1639 by the Irish Dominican and diplomat, Fr. Dominic O'Daly, finally closed its doors in August 2016. The Convent had survived the Lisbon earthquake of 1755 which almost totally destroyed the city and left 30'000 dead. Coincidentally, the shockwaves were felt in Cork and the resulting tsunami caused tidal surges several meters high in the rivers on the south coast of Ireland. An extensive history of the Convent is given in A Light Undimmed: The Story of the Convent of our Lady of Bom Successo Lisbon and Oral History – Recollections of Dominican Sisters of the Congregation of our Lady of the Roasary and St Catherine of Siena, Cabra, in the Convento De Nossa Senhora Do Bom Sucesso in Lisbon 1944–2016.

== Commemoration ==
Sleyne is commemorated within the neo-gothic St Colman's Cathedral of Cobh. The molded capitals, at the top of the internal columns, depict key scenes of the history of the diocese of Cork and Cloyne, two of which relate to Sleyne's imprisonment and exile. These are entitled Bishop John Baptist Sliney imprisoned in Cork and Bishop Sliney sentenced to transportation to Portugal. Because the cathedral was completed 200 years after Sleyne's death, it is improbable that the images bear any resemblance to Sleyne himself.
