= Denis Kelly =

Roman-catholic bishop

Denis Kelly, Doctor of Divinity (b Nenagh 12 January 1852; d Cobh 18 April 1924) was an Irish Roman Catholic Bishop.

Kelly was educated at St Flannan's College, Ennis, Co. Clare (the Killaloe diocesan seminary) and Le Collège des Irlandais, Paris. He was ordained priest on 17 March 1877 and appointed curate of Roscrea after which he was a teacher at his old school, rising to be its head. He was Bishop of Ross from 1897 until his death. Kelly was a member of the Agricultural Board for Ireland from 1900 to 1921; the Royal Commissioner on Poor Laws and the Relief of Distress, from 1906 to 1909; and of the Cabinet Committee on Irish Finance from 1911 to 1913. He is buried in St. Patrick's Cathedral, Skibbereen.

== Bibliography ==
- Fryde, E. B.; Greenway, D. E.; Porter, S.; Roy, I., eds. (1986). Handbook of British Chronology (3rd, reprinted 2003 ed.). Cambridge: Cambridge University Press. ISBN 0-521-56350-X.
- Moody, T. W.; Martin, F. X.; Byrne, F. J., eds. (1984). Maps, Genealogies, Lists: A Companion to Irish History, Part II. New History of Ireland. Vol. 9. Oxford: Oxford University Press. ISBN 0-19-821745-5.
