= Patrick Casey (bishop of Ross, Ireland) =

Roman-catholic bishop

Patrick Casey (b Ballynoe 28 January 1873; d Skibbereen 19 September 1940) was an Irish Roman Catholic Bishop.

Casey was educated at St Colman's College, Fermoy and St Patrick's College, Maynooth. He was ordained priest in 1896. He taught at St Kieran's College Kilkenny and then at his old school. He was Parish Priest of Newmarket, County Cork and became a Canon of Cloyne Cathedral in 1934. He was Bishop of Ross from 1935 until his death. Address Skibbereen, Cork
