= William Lyon (bishop) =

Last bishop of Ross

William Lyon (died 1617) was the English-born bishop of Cork, Cloyne, and Ross.

== Life ==
After being educated at Oxford, probably either at Oriel College or St John's College, Oxford he went to Ireland about 1570. He became vicar of Naas in 1573, and in 1580 Elizabeth I gave him the additional vicarage of Bodenstown in County Kildare. In 1577 he had license to enjoy the profits of his parish even when absent in England, but he seems to have generally resided in Ireland. When Arthur Grey, 14th Baron Grey de Wilton assumed the Irish government in 1580, Lyon was appointed his chaplain, and in 1582 he became the first Protestant bishop of Ross, in the province of Munster.

Lyon's impact was such that the mayor of Cork almost immediately petitioned Francis Walsingham to make him bishop of Cork and Cloyne. This was done temporarily in 1584, and in 1587 the three sees were united by patent. An Observantine Franciscan had been provided to Ross by the pope around 1580. Lyon had feared replacement, but Sir Henry Wallop, who was then in Munster, strongly supported him. The bishop went to Kinsale, inquiring into the rumours which preceded the Spanish Armada, and for years afterwards he kept an eye on those who were in correspondence with Spain. In 1589 he warned the government against promoting Thomas Wetherhead, who had been guilty of simony: but without effect, since Wetherhead was made Bishop of Waterford and Lismore, and continued his malpractices.

Lord Deputy William FitzWilliam, who did not have an especially high opinion of Church of Ireland bishops, wrote enthusiastically to Walsingham about Lyon's early evangelism: in 1589 and 1590 he had sometimes congregations in the thousands. But he had no Irish-speaking clergy. By the beginning of 1591, he had built a free school and a bridge at Ross. He spent his own money on the church there and on the palace; but the palace was burned down by the Lord of Clancahill, Donnell II O'Donovan, within three years of its completion. Even at Cork Lyon found no residence, and he laid out over £1,000 in building one. He provided bibles and prayer books in English and had them distributed throughout his diocese. There was Catholic opposition from the religious orders, Owen MacEgan, bishop-designate acting as vicar-apostolic throughout Munster, and Dermot McCraghe, the Roman Catholic Bishop of Cork and Cloyne. On 27 September 1595, Lyon told Lord Burghley that his congregations had dwindled away. He took a moderate line that the Irish would respond to justice, and the soldiery was harmful to his cause, but wanted the exclusion of priests from abroad. During the violent disturbances of 1598 Lyon and his family fled in fear of their lives, but quickly returned. Lyon was included in every commission for the government of Munster. When Sir Thomas Crooke, founder of Baltimore, was accused of piracy in 1608, Lyon was among his strongest defenders, arguing that he had worked miracles in creating a thriving town out of nothing in barely three years.

Lyon raised the annual value of Cork and Ross several-fold, by research into titles and good management. The diocese of Cloyne was a different matter, where he was up against Sir John FitzEdmund Fitzgerald, the lay dean of Cloyne, and his court influence, who had been leased the lands through a nominee, by Matthew Sheyn. Fitzgerald used a device of giving the lands to the Crown, which then granted them to him and his heirs, and they only returned to the diocese on any scale after 1660.

Lyon, who lived to a good age, died at Cork on 4 October 1617, and was buried in a tomb which he had raised for himself twenty years before in the palace grounds. His bones were accidentally found in 1846, and in 1865 were moved to the crypt of the new cathedral. The bishop's wife, Elizabeth, was alive in 1640. A daughter was killed by the O'Donovans in 1642, when the rebels attacked the church at Ross. This was probably not Mary, who apparently died in 1617, having married Henry Becher, who for a time was acting Lord President of Munster: their grandson was the politician Thomas Beecher. A son, William, of St. John's College, Oxford, was admitted B.A. in 1611.
