= Roger Skiddy =

Roger Skiddy, Rector of Kilmore, County Cavan then Dean of Limerick, was Bishop of Cork and Cloyne from 1557 until his resignation in 1566.
