= John McCarthy (Irish bishop) =

Irish clergyman and bishop

- Bishop of Cloyne
- Church: Catholic Church
- Diocese: Diocese of Cloyne
- In office: 1 September 1874 – 9 December 1893
- Predecessor: William Keane
- Successor: Robert Browne

Orders
- Ordination: 21 May 1842
- Consecration: 28 October 1874 by William Delany

Personal details
- Born: 20 June 1815 Fermoy, County Cork, United Kingdom of Great Britain and Ireland
- Died: 9 December 1893 (aged 78)

John McCarthy (born 1815 in Fermoy) was an Irish clergyman and bishop of the Roman Catholic Diocese of Cloyne. He was ordained in 1842. He was appointed bishop in 1874. He died in 1893.
