= Bishop of Cork and Cloyne =

Episcopal title in Ireland

The Bishop of Cork and Cloyne was an episcopal title which took its name after the city of Cork and the town of Cloyne in southern Ireland.

== History ==
The see was formed by the union of the bishoprics of Cork and Cloyne in 1429. Following the Reformation, there were parallel apostolic successions: one of the Church of Ireland and the other of the Roman Catholic Church.

== Pre-Reformation bishops ==
Pre-Reformation Bishops of Cork and Cloyne
From	Until	Incumbent	Notes
1429	1469	Jordan Purcell	Appointed 15 June 1429; confirmed 6 January 1432; received possession of temporalities 25 September 1432; resigned after 18 April 1469.
1463	1477	Gerald FitzGerald	Appointed before 3 February 1462; died circa 1477.
1472	1490	William Roche	Appointed 26 October 1472; resigned before April 1490.
1490	1492	Thaddeus McCarthy	Bishop-designate of Ross; appointed 21 April 1490; died 24 October 1492; beatified by Pope Leo XIII on 14 September 1896; also known as Tadhg Mac Cartaigh.
1499		Patrick Cant, O.Cist.	Abbot of Fermoy; appointed 15 February 1499, but annulled 26 June 1499.
1499	1520	John fitzEdmund FitzGerald	Appointed 26 June 1499; died before 27 August 1520.
1523	1536	John Bennet	Appointed 28 January 1523; died 1536.

== Post-Reformation bishops ==
=== Church of Ireland succession ===
Church of Ireland Bishops of Cork and Cloyne
From	Until	Incumbent	Notes
1536	1557	Dominic Tirrey ^{[A]}	Nominated by King Henry VIII 11 June 1536; letters patent 25 September 1536; probably swore the Oath of Supremacy at Clonmel early in 1539 absolved of schism by Cardinal Pole 27 November 1556; died circa August 1557.
1557	1567	Roger Skiddy ^{[B]}	Grant of Temporalities 2 November 1557 and confirmed by letters patent in 1562; consecrated 30 October 1562; appointed on a commission in 1564 to administer the Oath of Supremacy; resigned 18 March 1567
1570	1571	Richard Dixon	Nominated 17 May and letters patent 6 June 1570; deprived 8 November 1571
1572	1582/83	Matthew Sheyn	Nominated 2 January and letters patent 29 May 1572; died 1582 or 1583
In 1583, the see combined with Ross and formed the united see of Cork, Cloyne and Ross

=== Roman Catholic succession ===
Roman Catholic Bishops of Cork and Cloyne
From	Until	Incumbent	Notes
1540		Lewis Macnamara, O.F.M.	Appointed 24 September 1540, but not consecrated
1540	1556	John O'Heyne	Appointed 5 November 1540; died before 1556; also administered the Diocese of Elphin 1545-1556
1556	1557	Dominic Tirrey ^{[C]}	Appointed as the Church of Ireland bishop by King Henry VIII in 1536; absolved of schism by Cardinal Pole 27 November 1556; died circa August 1557
1557	1567	Roger Skiddy ^{[D]}	Granted by the order of Queen Mary 18 September 1557; said to have been consecrated papali ritu 30 October 1562, although this statement has been called 'untenable'; appointed on a commission in 1564 to administer the Oath of Supremacy; resigned 1567; "he was not recognized by Rome. He is ... condemned ... because he was reappointed by Elizabeth on 31 July 1562 ... he certainly accepted the supremacy when he accepted his appointment from Elizabeth"
1568	1574	Nicholas Landes	Appointed 27 February 1568; died circa 1574
1574	1579	Edmund Tanner	Appointed 5 November 1574; died 4 June 1579
1580	1603	Dermot McCraghe	Appointed 12 October 1580; died after 1603
appointed 1614		James Miagh	Appointed vicar apostolic of Cork and Cloyne by papal brief 3 September 1614
appointed 1621		Robert Miagh	Appointed vicar apostolic of Cork and Cloyne by papal brief 13 July 1621
1622	1646	William Tirry	Appointed 24 January 1622; died March. 1646
1647	1662	Robert Barry	Appointed 8 April 1647; died 6 July 1662
1662	1676	See vacant	
1676	1693	Peter Creagh	Appointed 13 May 1676; translated to Dublin 9 March 1693;
From 1693 to 1747, the Roman Catholic bishops were also Apostolic Administrators of Ross
1693	1712	John Baptist Sleyne, O.S.A.	Appointed 13 April 1693; resigned 22 January 1712; died 16 February 1712
1712	1726	Donagh MacCarthy	Appointed 16 July 1712; died March. 1726
1727	1747	Thaddeus MacCarthy	Appointed 7 April 1727; died 14 August 1747
In 1747, the see was separated into the bishopric of Cork and the bishopric of Cloyne and Ross

== Notes ==
- Dominic Tirrey ^{A} ^{C} and Roger Skiddy ^{B} ^{D} were bishops of both successions.
