= Eugene Egan =

Eugene Egan (Owen McEgan and other variants) (died 1603) was a Catholic apostolic vicar in Ireland, designated bishop of Ross, County Cork, closely involved with the uprising of the Nine Years' War.

== Life ==
Egan obtained the degrees of Master of Arts and Bachelor of Divinity from a Spanish university. In 1600 he was in Ireland actively encouraging rebellion, meeting Hugh O'Neill, 2nd Earl of Tyrone in February at Tipperary, and co-operating with Florence MacCarthy Reagh.

Tyrone and Florence MacCarthy sent Egan to Rome in quest of an excommunication for all that did not rebel. One result was that the Jesuit Luigi Mansoni was appointed papal nuncio to Ireland. Egan then gained access to the Spanish court at Valladolid, travelling there with Mansoni, and influenced Philip III of Spain, in the direction of sending men and money to support the rebellion which Tyrone had raised in the south of Ireland. Pope Clement VIII summoned Egan back to Rome, appointed him apostolic vicar, created him D.D., and conferred on him livings in Munster.

Egan arrived at Kilmakilloge in Kenmare Bay in June 1601, in a ship bringing troops and finance from Spain. The 4th Spanish Armada was sent in September and Spanish troops made landfall. At Kinsale, Charles Blount, 8th Baron Mountjoy invested the town held by the Spanish. The Irish rebels under Tyrone were then defeated outside the town, and the Spanish in Kinsale were forced to surrender.

Egan's career ended in an encounter with English soldiers under William Taaffe in Carberry on 5 January 1603, where he was killed. He was buried in the convent of Timoleague, in the diocese of Ross, and a small cross was placed above his tomb. A breviary (printed in Venice in 1600) apparently held by Egan when he was killed is now at Cambridge University Library (shelfmark Rel.e.60.2). It contains a note apparently in the hand of Sir Thomas Stafford, who came into possession of Egan's books, and was later in the library of John Hacket, Bishop of Lichfield & Coventry, who bequeathed it to the Library in 1670.

== See also ==
- Catholic Church in Ireland

== Notes ==
Attribution

This article incorporates text from a publication now in the public domain: Lee, Sidney, ed. (1893). "MacEgan, Owen". Dictionary of National Biography. Vol. 35. London: Smith, Elder & Co.
