= Ennis (parish) =

Catholic parish in County Clare, Ireland

- Roman Catholic parish
- Location in Ireland
- Coordinates: 52°50′46.68″N 8°58′50.52″W
- Country: Ireland
- Province: Munster
- County: County Clare
- Time zone: UTC+0 (WET)
  - Summer (DST): UTC-1 (IST (WEST))

Ennis is a parish in County Clare, Ireland, and part of the Abbey grouping of parishes within the Roman Catholic Diocese of Killaloe.

Current (2022) co-parish priest and team leader is Tom Ryan. He leads a team of 8 priests.

The present parish contains much of the mediaeval parish of Dromcliffe. The part around Inch was transferred to the parish of Kilmaley in the eighteenth century Contrary to the name, it does not contain all of the town of Ennis, as the eastern part around Roslevan belongs to the parish of Doora-Barefield.

== Churches ==
The main church is the Ennis Cathedral, officially "Cathedral of Saints Peter and Paul". Originally built as a big parish church, it had a difficult start. The site was donated by the protestant Francis Gore in January 1828. Shortly after the start of the actual building, the project had to be stopped due to financial constraints, and did not resume till 1831. Financial trouble kept hampering the project and only in 1842 the first mass was said in the then still incomplete church. The famine stopped work altogether and building resumed by bits and bobs in the 1850s with the building only finished in 1874 when the spire was completed. In 1889 the parish church was elevated to a pro-Cathedral (temporary cathedral, as bishop McRedmond claimed the now protestant cathedral in Killaloe as the real cathedral. Only in 1990, under bishop Harty, it became a full cathedral. The church replaced the chapel in what is now Chapel Lane.

After a long population stagnation in Ennis, a period of rapid growth followed. This led to the building of two new churches in the 1970s:

- With the replacement of the workhouse by St. Josephs Hospital, an oratory was built for the patients there. The St. Joseph's Church, built in 1972, soon became the parish church for the eastern part of Ennis.
- In 1978 an oratory, Christ the King Church, was built in the primary school "Scoil Chríost Rí" in the neighbourhood Cloughleigh. This oratory was soon acting as the parish church for the western part of Ennis. In 2018 the school moved out of the building and the space was added to the church.

Outside the parish structure but fully functioning towards the population of Ennis is the Franciscan Friary. Beside that are there the oratory of the Poor Clares Monastery and the chapel of Ennis Hospital.

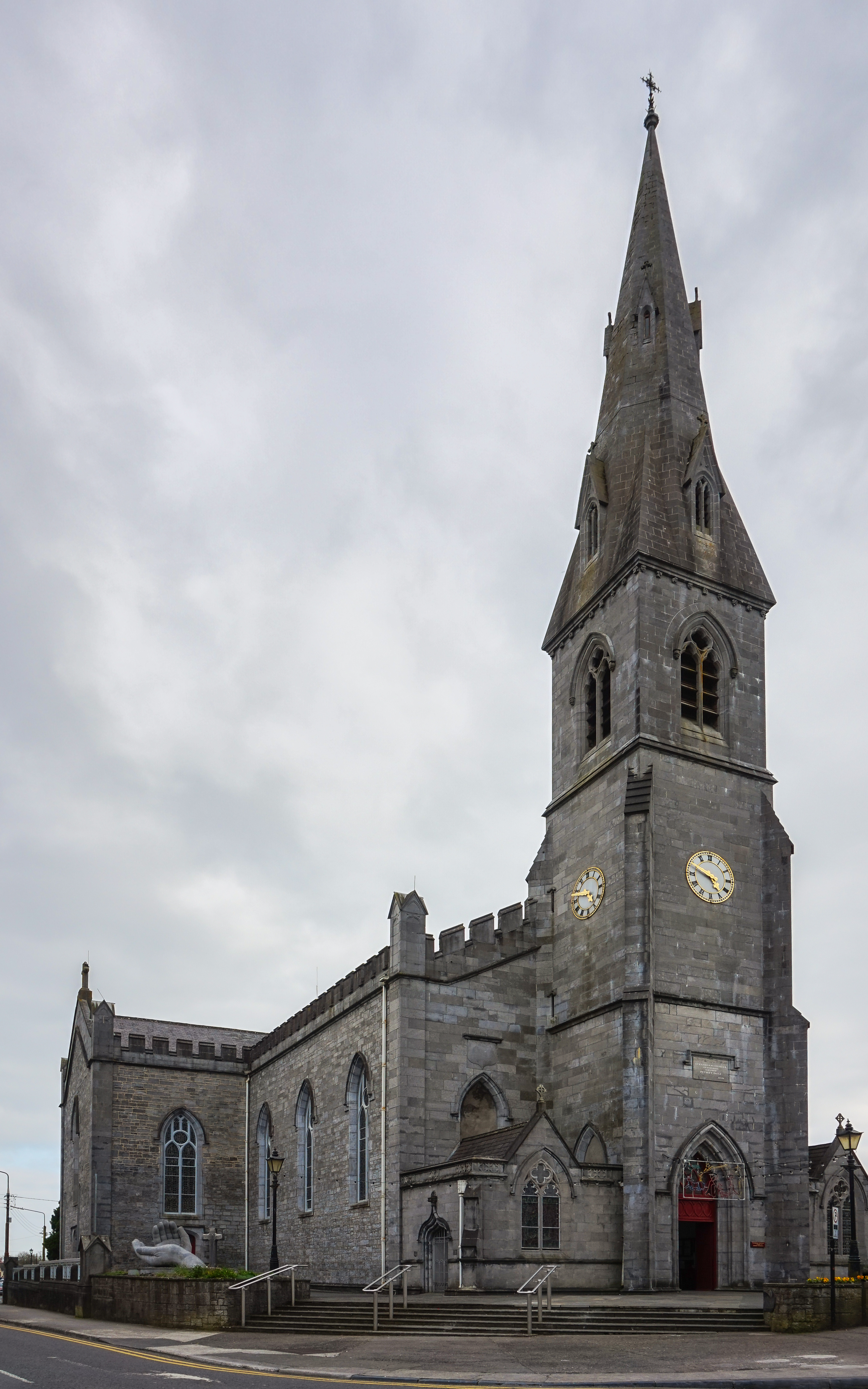
Cathedral of Saints Peter and Paul

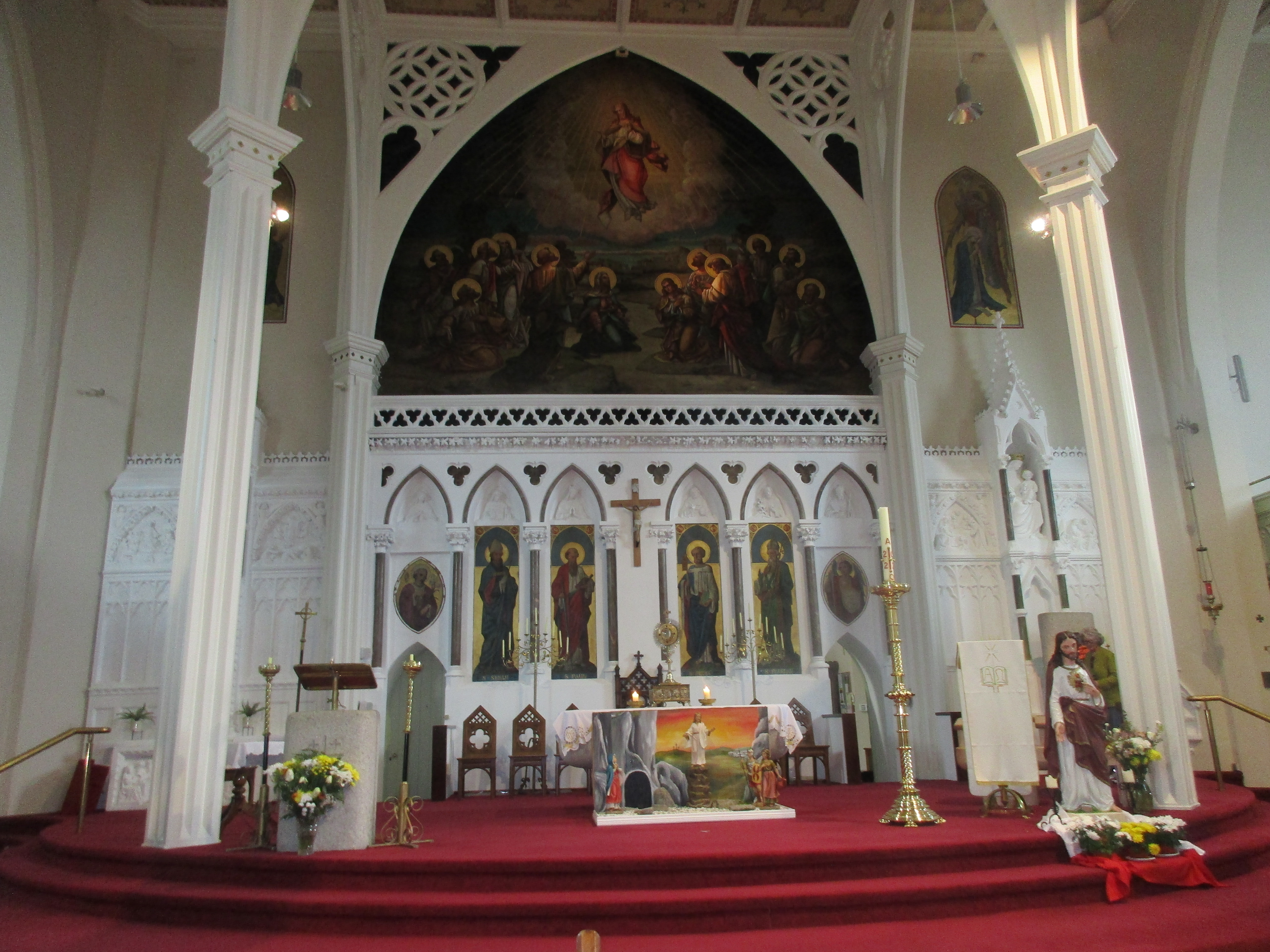
Cathedral of Saints Peter and Paul - altar

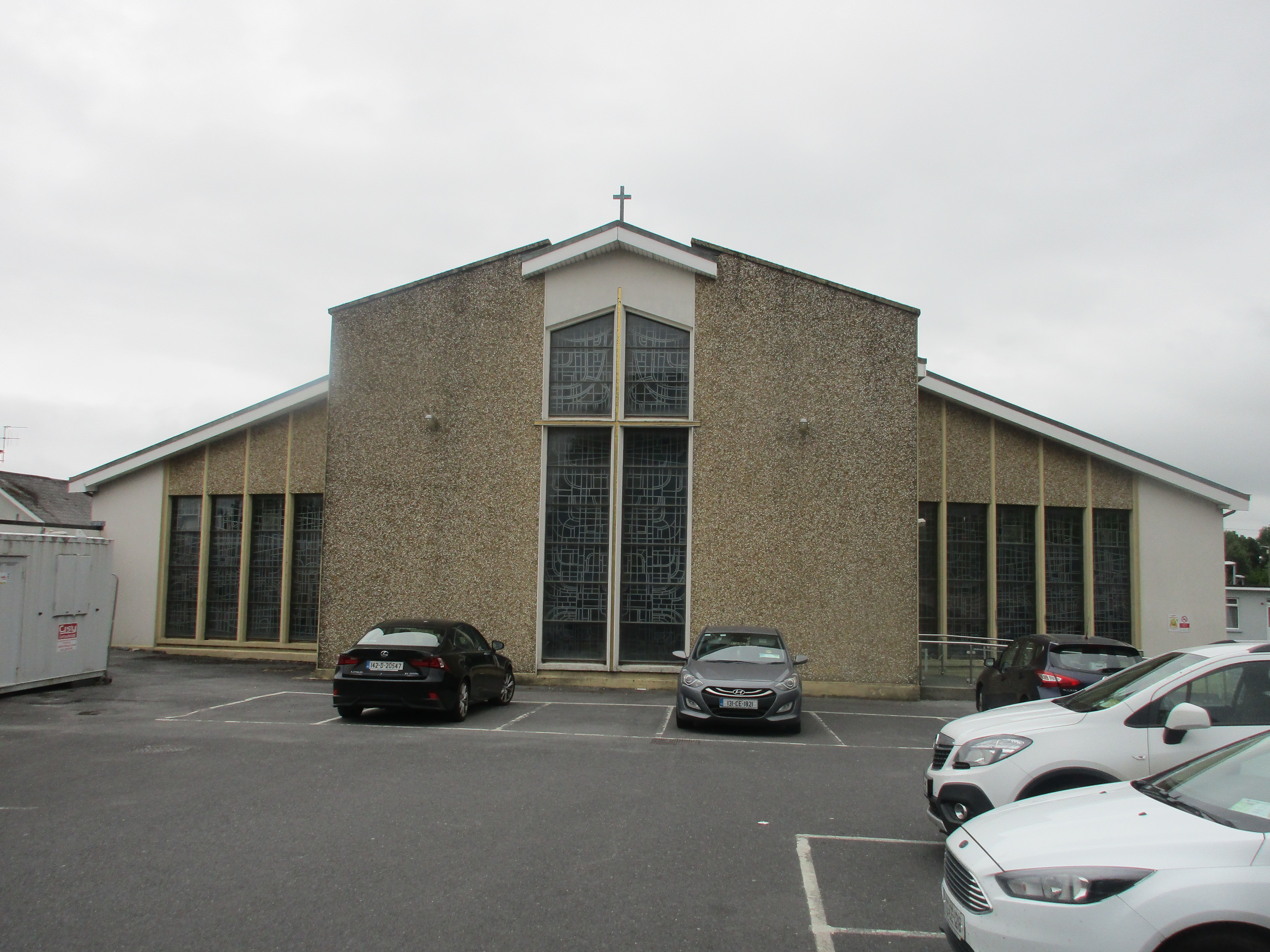
The outside of St. Joseph's Church

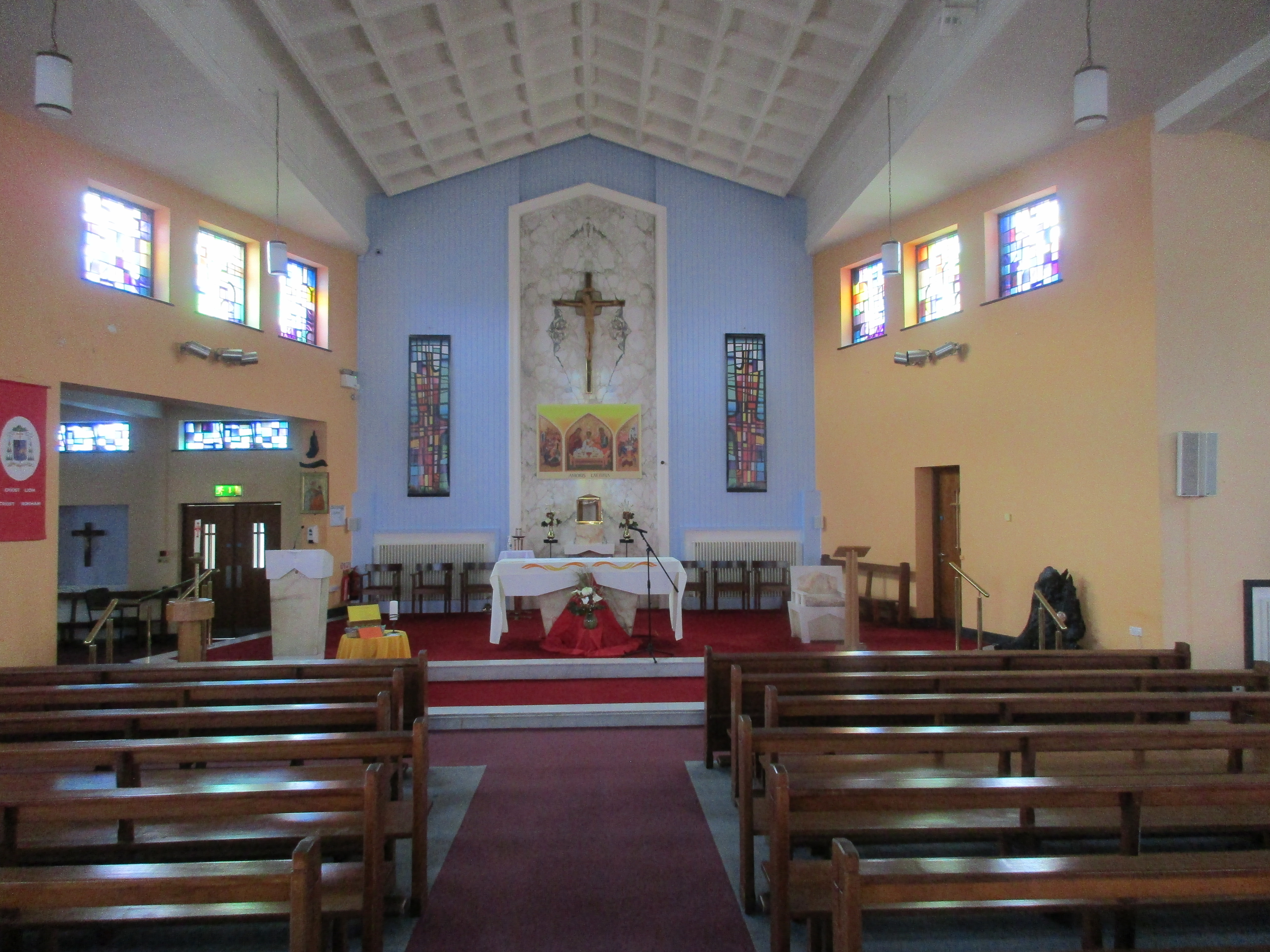
St. Joseph's Church - altar

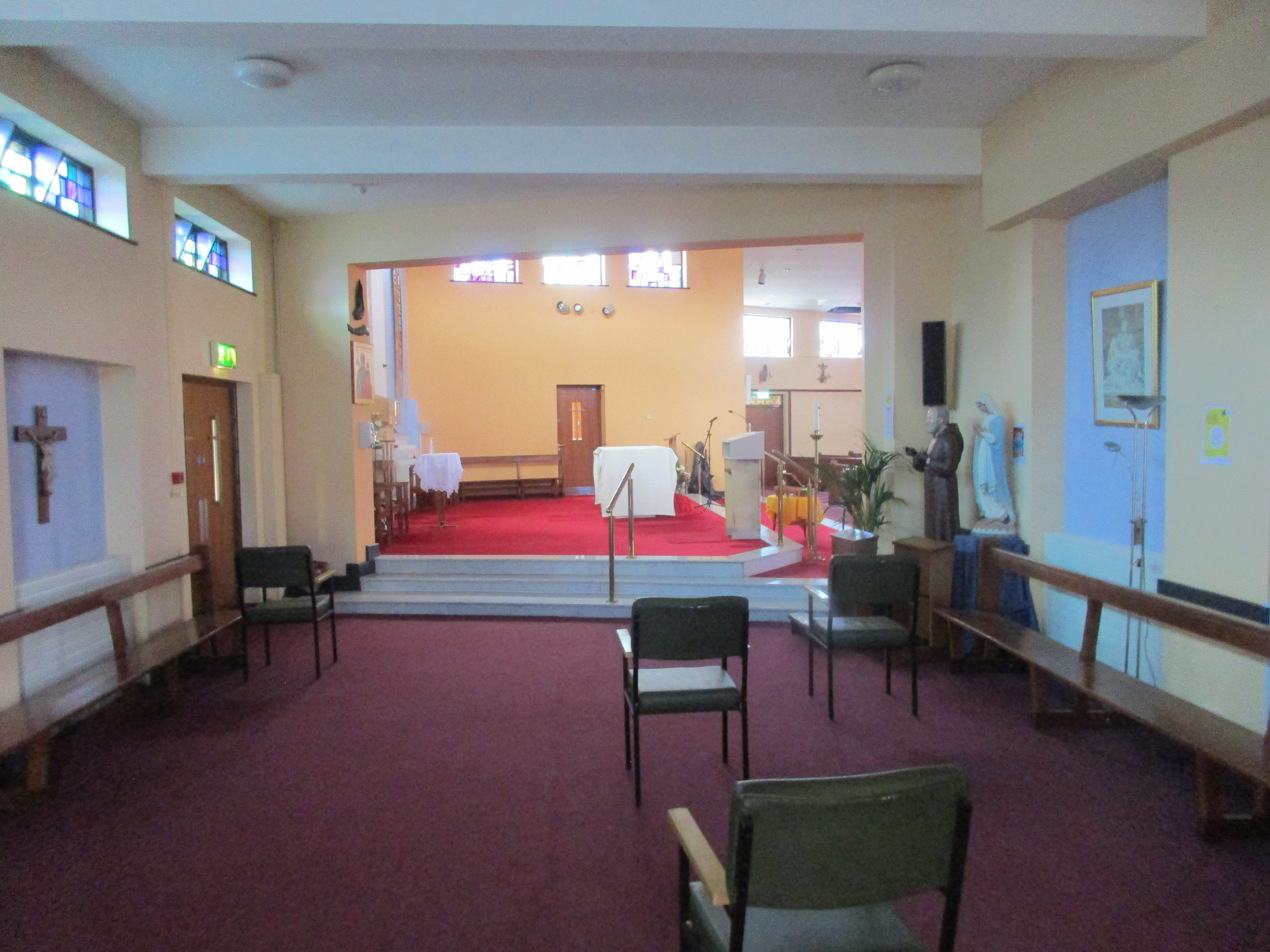
St. Joseph's Church - side chapel for patients of St. Joseph's Hospital

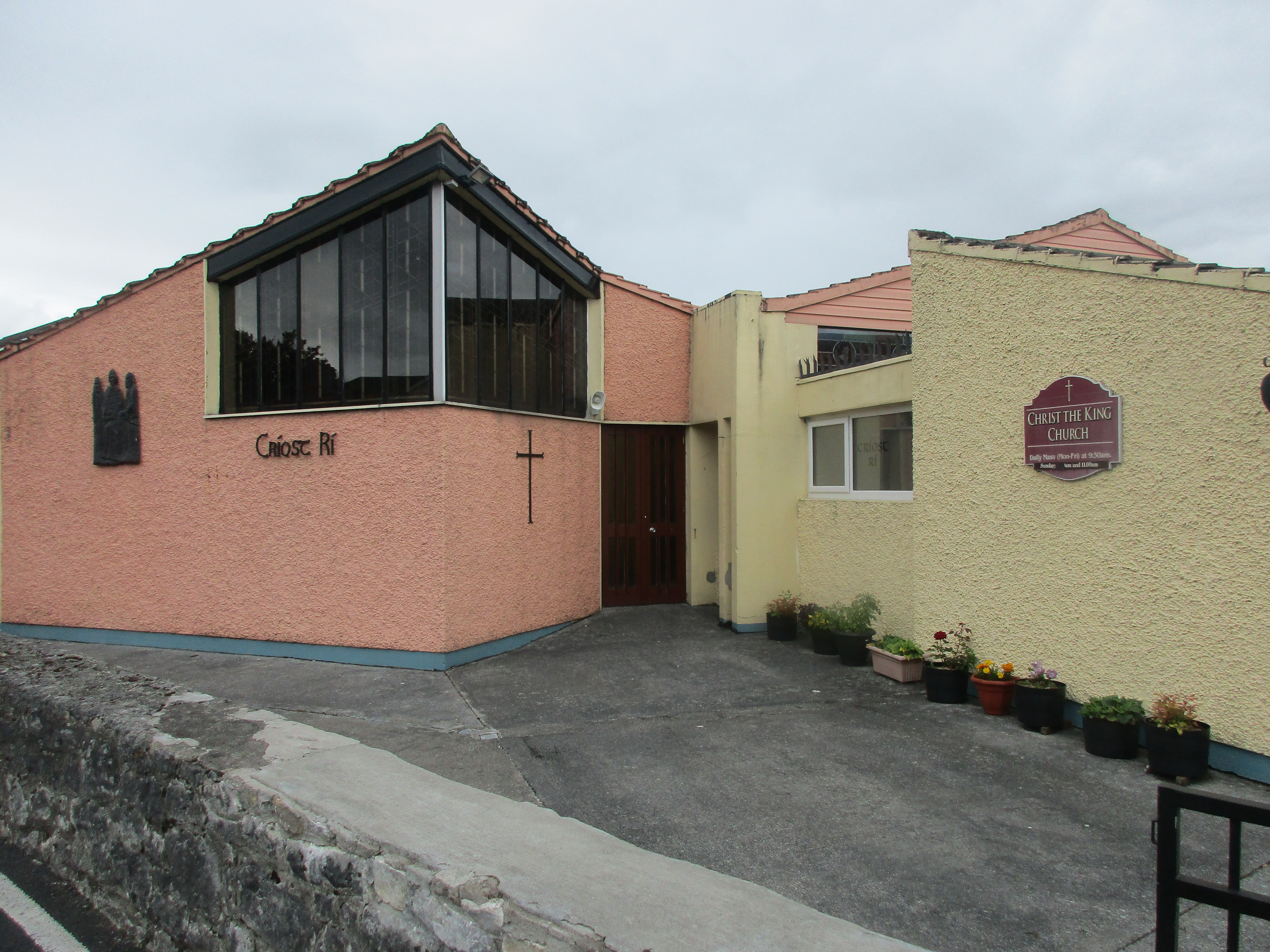
Outside of Christ the King Church

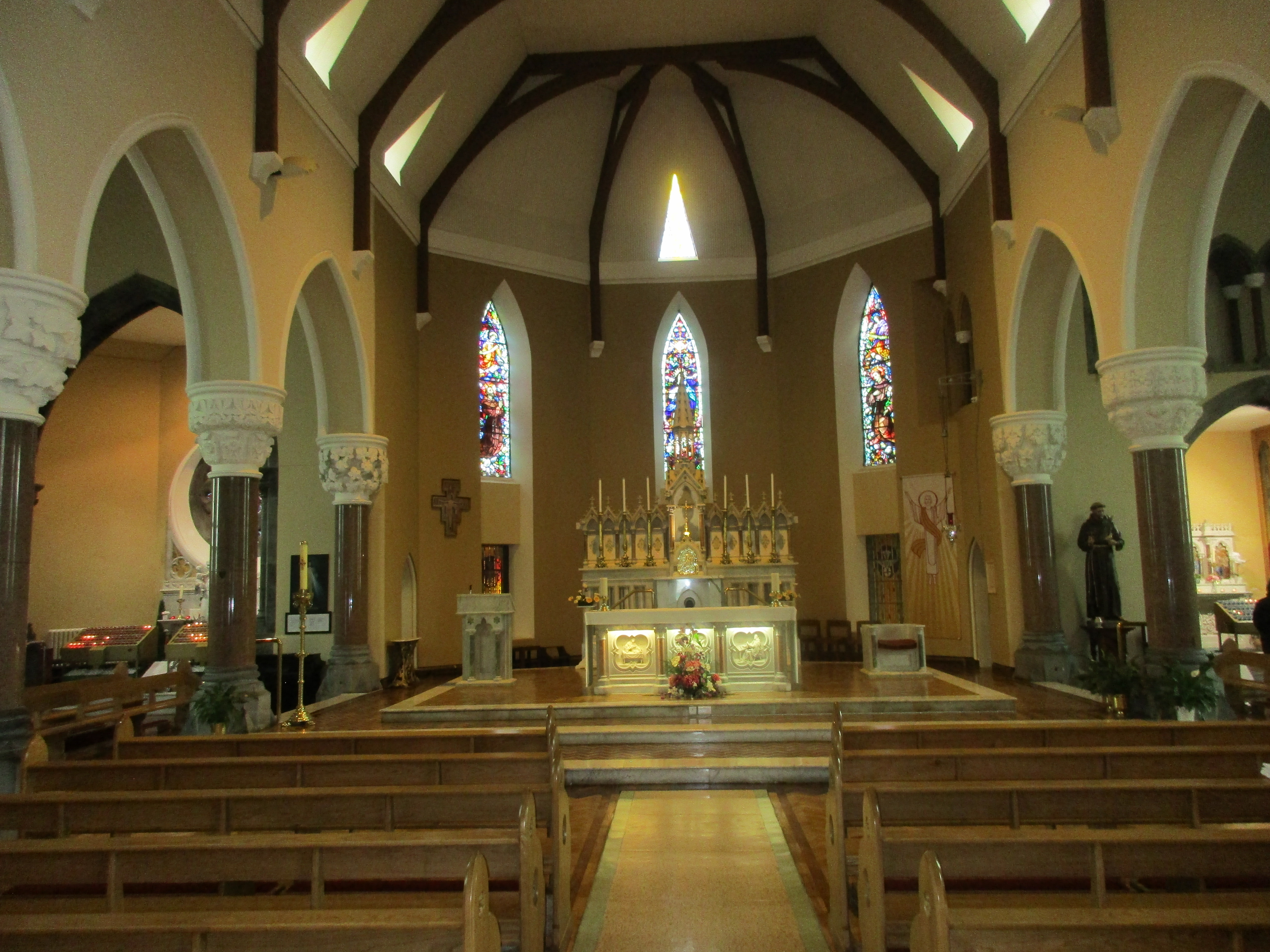
Franciscan Friary - altar

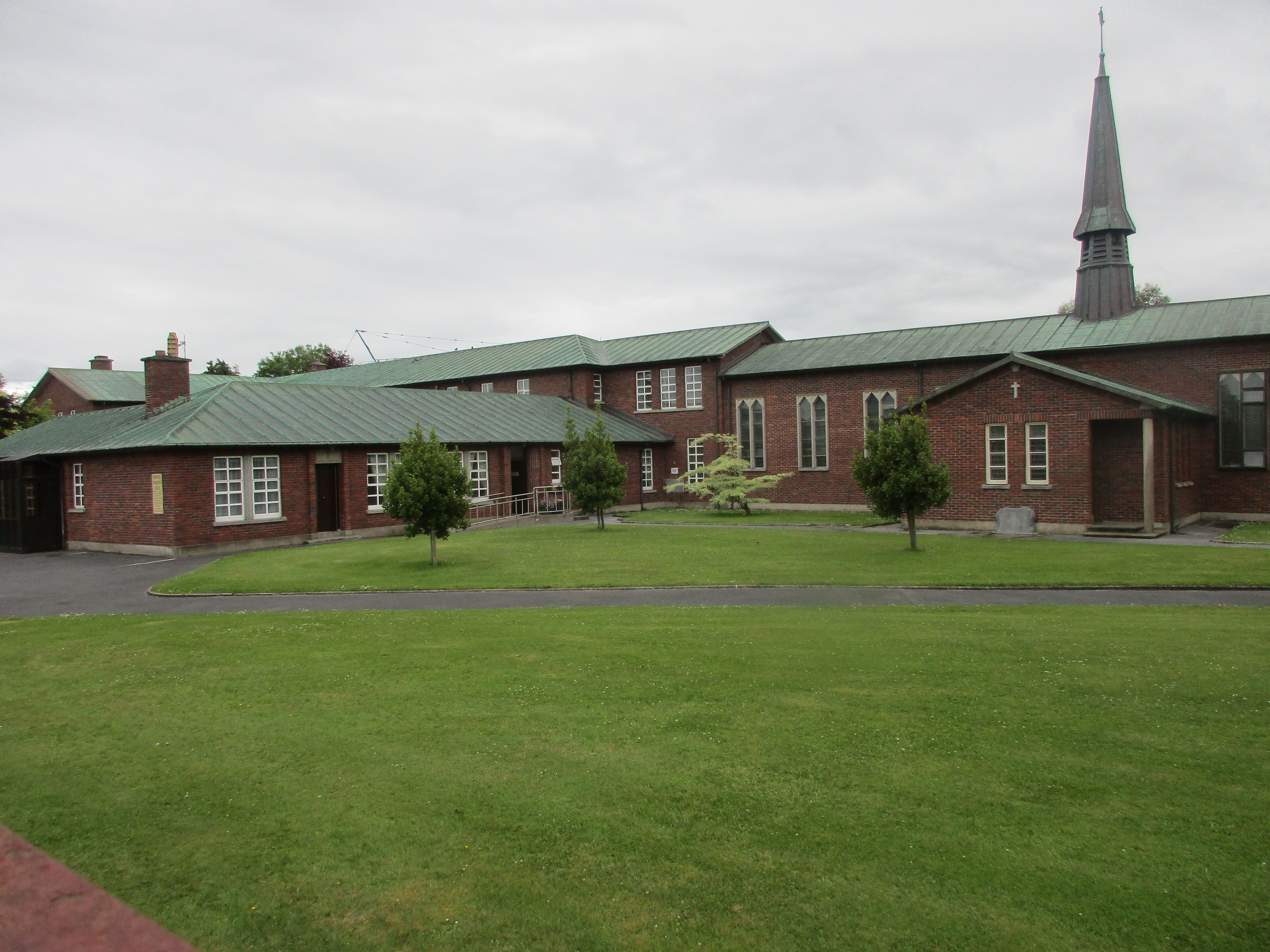
Poor Clares Monastery

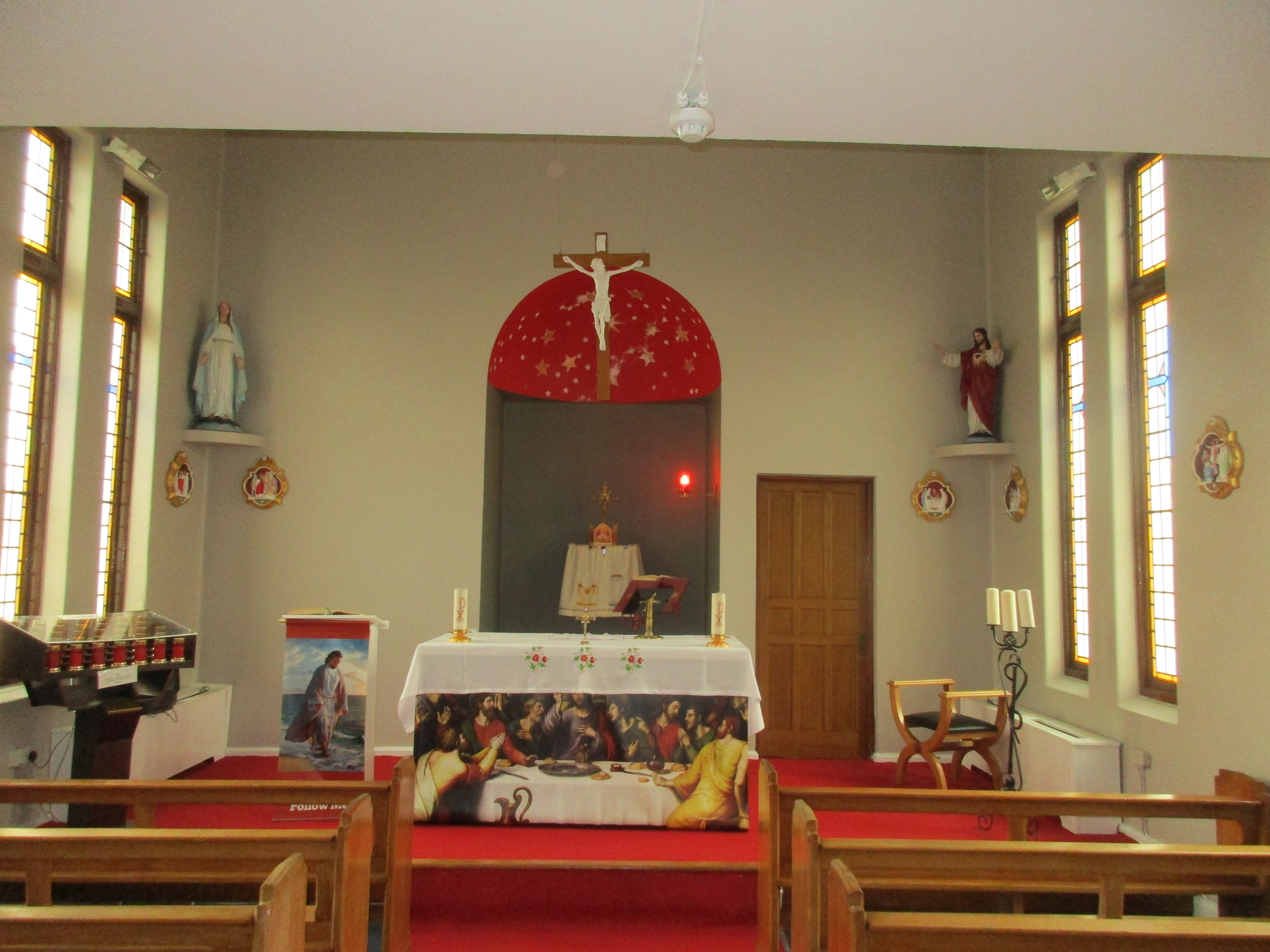
Ennis Hospital - chapel
