= Tulla (parish) =

- Roman Catholic parish
- Location in Ireland
- Coordinates: 52.869°N 8.76°W
- Country: Ireland
- Province: Munster
- County: County Clare
- Time zone: UTC+0 (WET)
  - Summer (DST): UTC-1 (IST (WEST))

Tulla is a parish in County Clare, Ireland, and part of the Ceantar na Lochanna grouping of parishes within the Roman Catholic Diocese of Killaloe.

As of 2021, the co-parish priest is Brendan Quinlivan.

The main church of the parish is the Church of Saints Peter and Paul in Tulla, built from 1832 to 1837. The building was renovated in 1971, receiving a far more modest exterior. It was rededicated by bishop Harty.

The second church of the parish is the Church of Immaculate Conception in Drumcharley. This church was built in 1838-1839 and was during construction severely damaged in the Night of the Big Wind. The third church is the St. James's Church in Knockjames, built in the period 1882–1884.
