= Ballynacally-Lissycasey (parish) =

Roman Catholic parish in County Clare, Ireland

- Roman Catholic parish
- Location in Ireland
- Coordinates: 52°43′6.52″N 9°4′1.08″W
- Country: Ireland
- Province: Munster
- County: County Clare
- Time zone: UTC+0 (WET)
  - Summer (DST): UTC-1 (IST (WEST))

Ballynacally-Lissycasey is a parish in County Clare, Ireland, and part of the Radharc na n-Oiléan grouping of parishes within the Roman Catholic Diocese of Killaloe.

As of 2022, the co-parish priest is Brendan Kyne.

The parish is an amalgamation of the mediaeval parishes of Kilchreest and Clondegad.

The main church of the parish is the Our Lady of the Wayside in Lissycasey. This church is built in 1979 and resembles a dolmen. It replaced a church dedicated by bishop Michael Flannery in 1859, that was serving till 1977.

The second church of the parish is the Church of Christ the King in Ballycorick. This church was built in 1860 on land donated by the landlord T.R. Henn

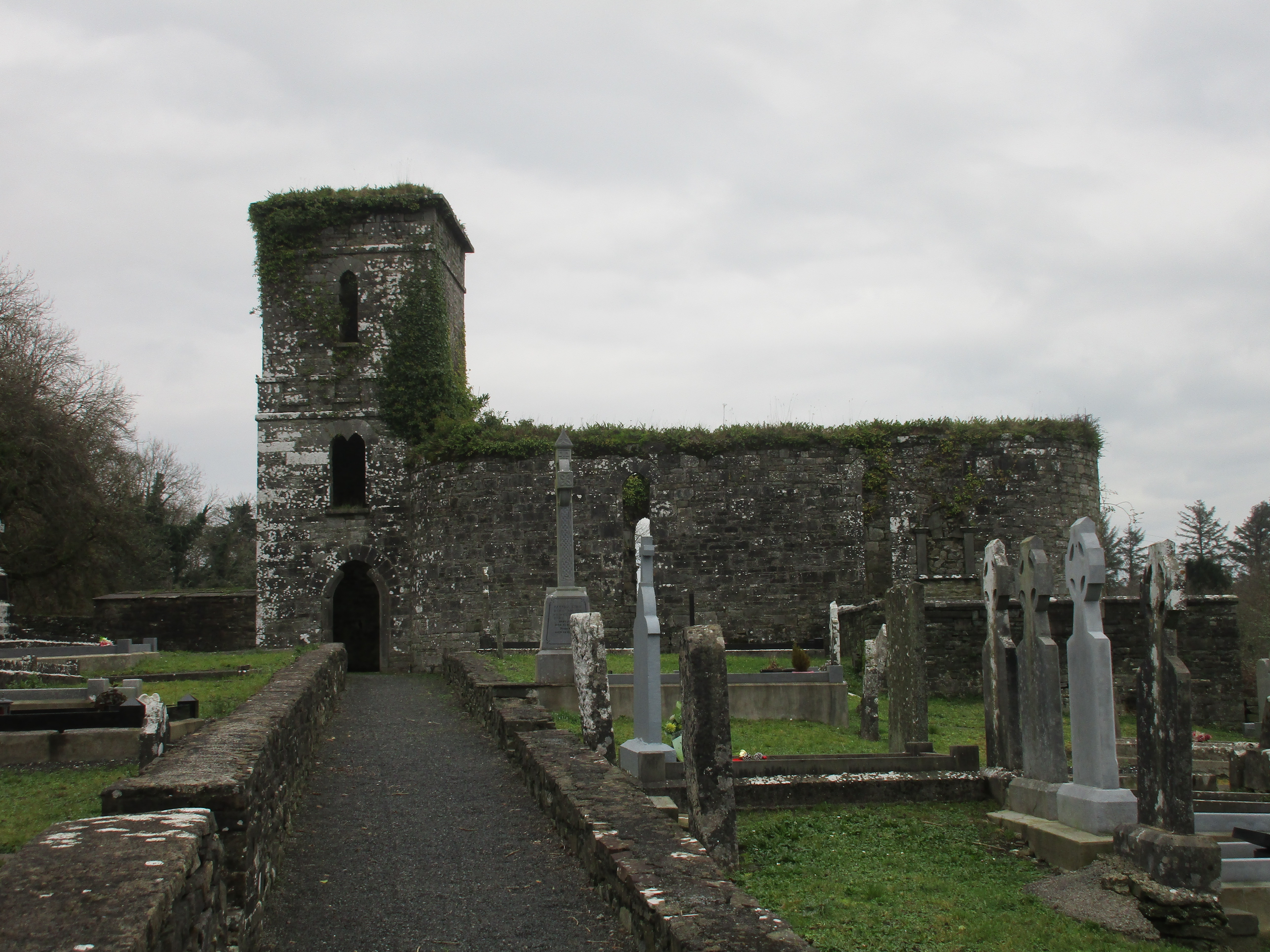
The former protestant church in Clondegad, built at the location of the mediaeval catholic church

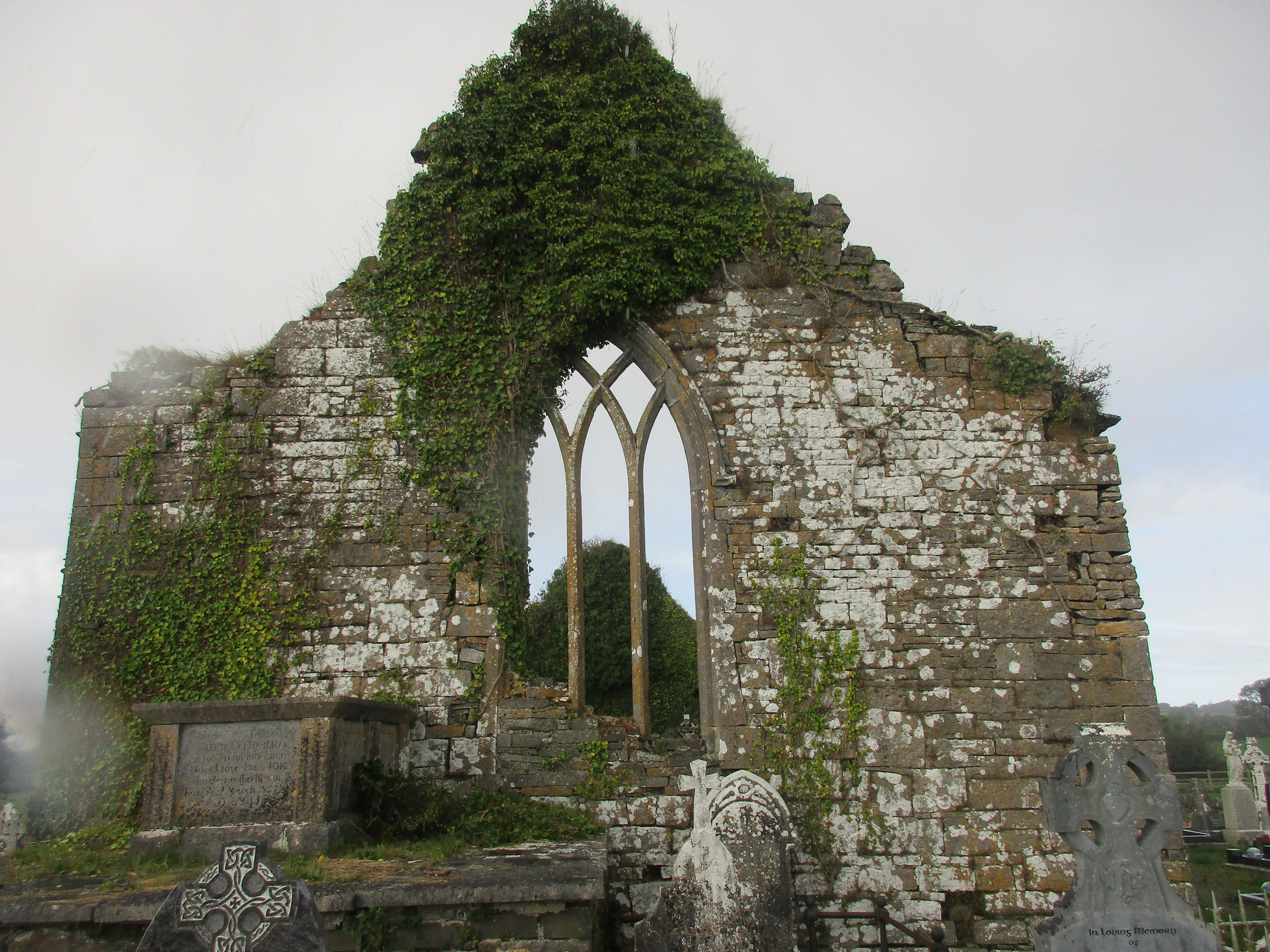
South wall of the church of the mediaeval parish of Kilchreest

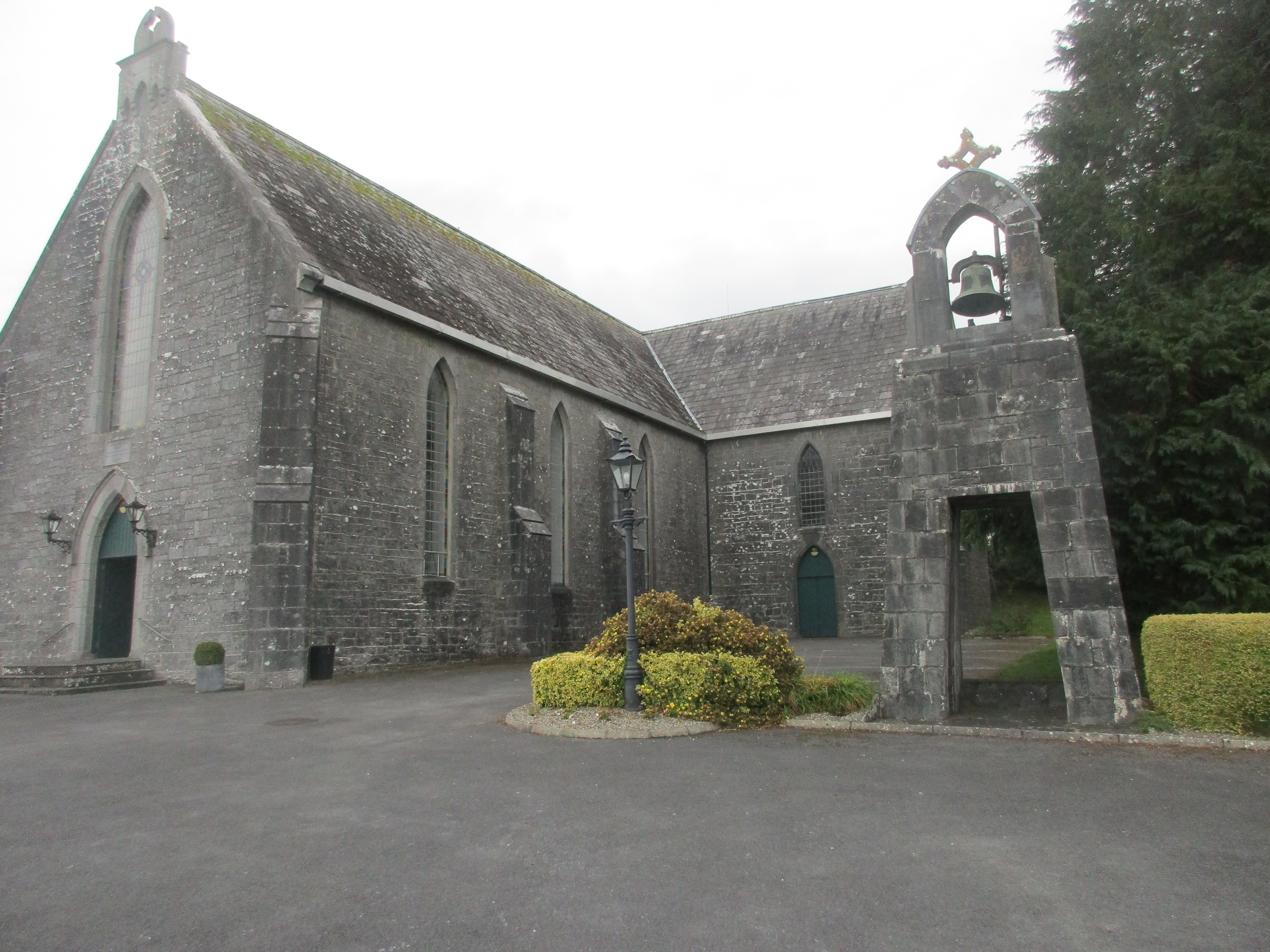
Church of Christ the King in Ballycorick

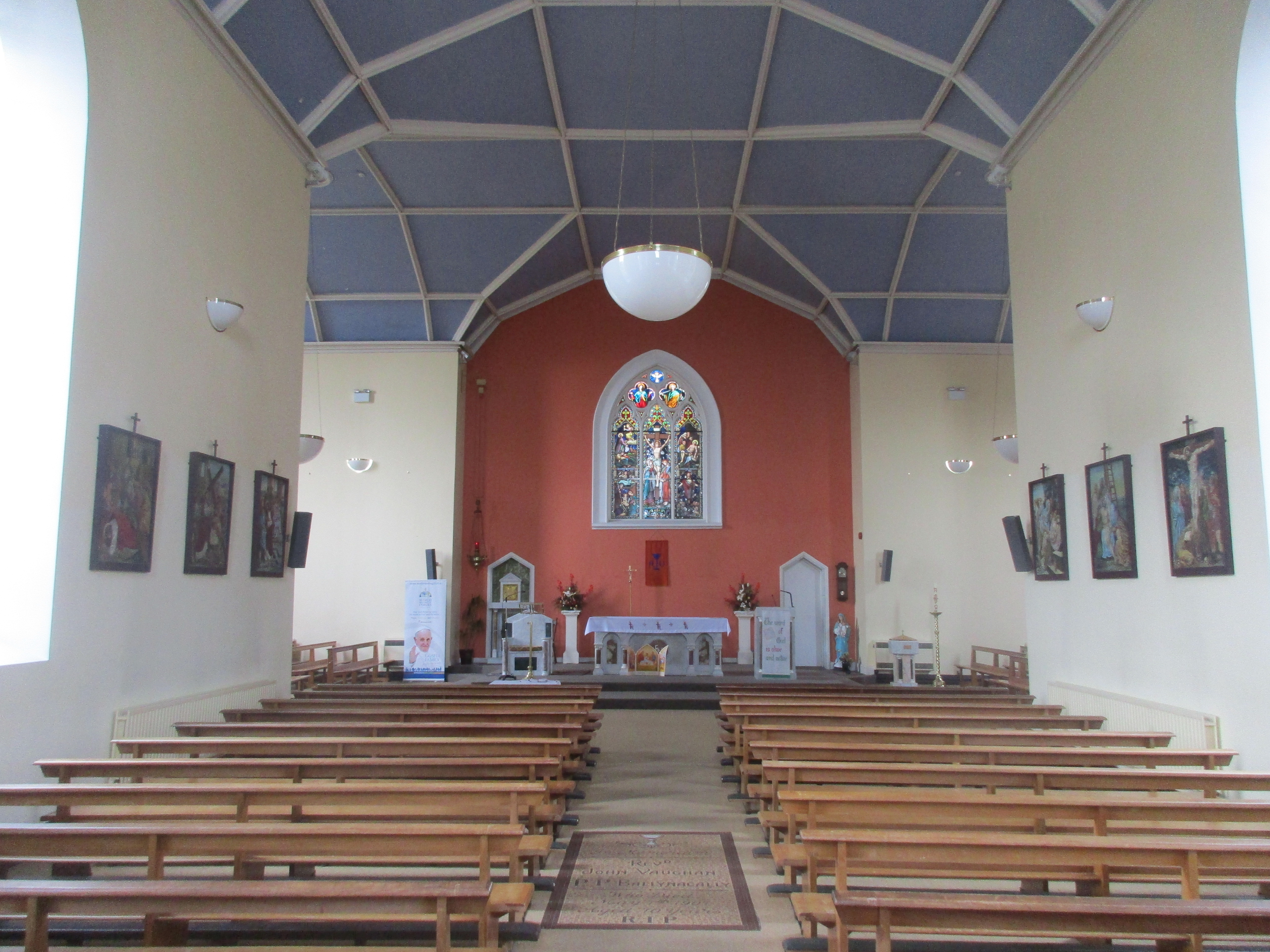
Altar and stained windows

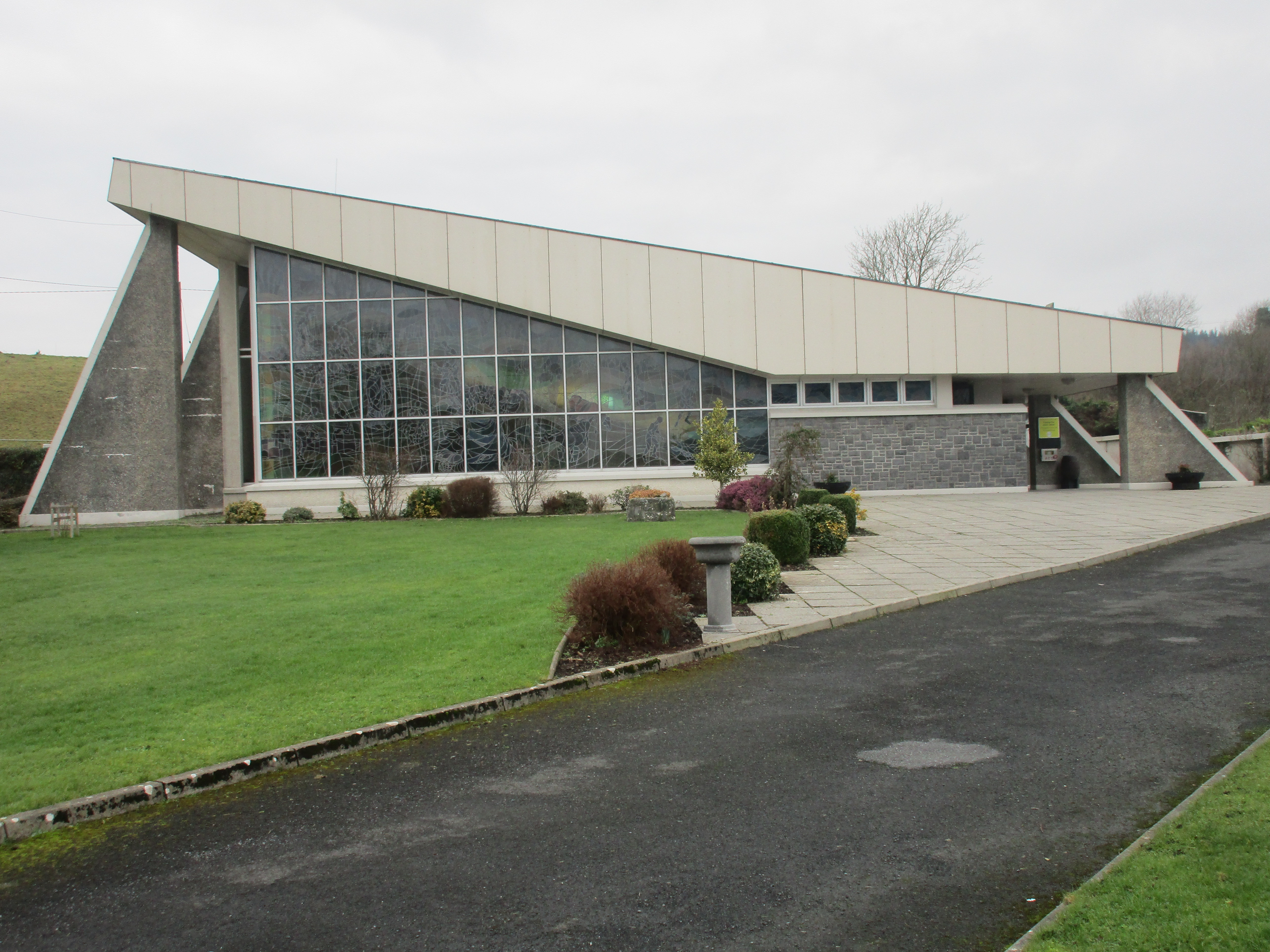
Outside of Our Lady of the Wayside in Lissycasey, built to resemble a dolmen
