= St Flannan's College =

Secondary school in Ennis, Ireland

Coordinates: 52.8336°N 8.9834°W

Saint Flannan's College
- Coláiste Fhlannáin Naofa
- Collegium Sancti Flannani
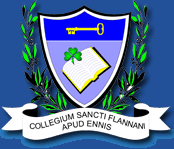
- Crest of the college(Top)
- Ennis, County Clare, Ireland

Information
- Patron saint: Saint Flannan
- Established: 1846; 180 years ago
- Principal: Donal Cahir
- Staff: 105 (2025)
- Enrollment: 1,276 (2025)
- Website: www.stflannanscollege.ie
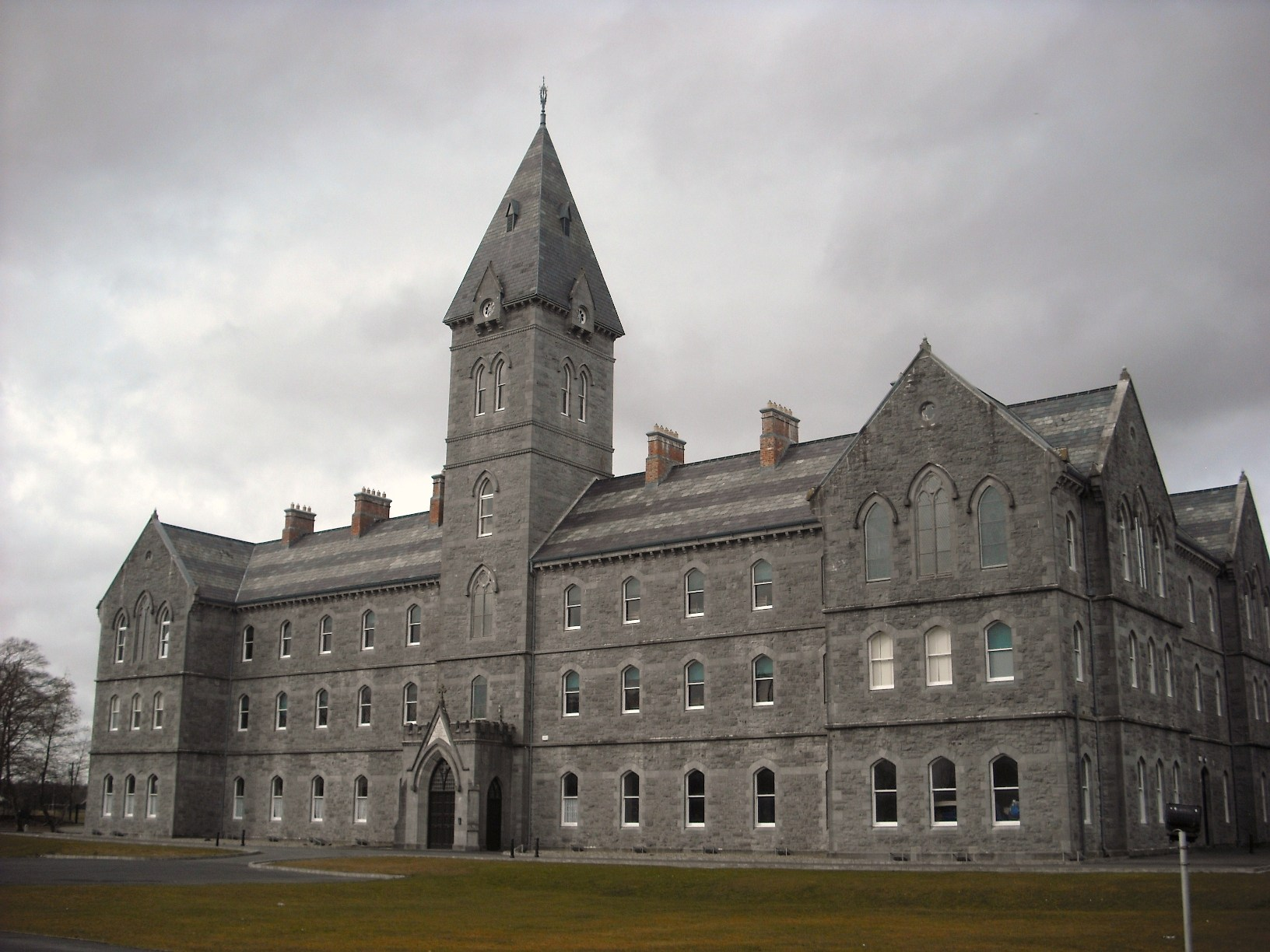
- View of the front of the College

Saint Flannan's College is an Irish co-educational secondary school located in Ennis, County Clare, which takes its name from the 7th century patron saint of the Dál gCais. It was formerly an all-boys boarding school. The first co-ed class began in 2002 for First Year students. In 2003 an extension which added over 20 new rooms and extensive new facilities to the college was completed. The school had rapidly expanded since 1962, when there were some 370 pupils, 140 of whom were day boys, and only 37 teachers. By 2004, enrollment had risen to more than 1,000 students, and Staff numbers had risen to 60. In 2005, the boarding portion of the school was closed. In the 2010–11 school year there were 1,206 students. This has since grown again to 1,276 students in 2025-2026. St. Flannan's College is the largest Secondary School in Munster.

== History ==
In 1846, the Diocese of Killaloe lent its prestige and patronage to the private academy conducted at Springfield House, Ennis, by a Mr Fitzsimons. Fortified by diocesan support, the school would henceforth function as both a diocesan seminary and as a day and boarding school for Catholic boys. Under this arrangement, the Springfield House school flourished, and by the early 1850s was already enticing pupils away from Erasmus Smith College, College Road. Springfield pupils were conspicuously successful in obtaining scholarships to the Queen's Colleges at Galway and Cork (now UG and UCC). In 1859, Fitzsimons added a new wing to the college in order to cater for the increased number of students. The same year, Springfield affiliated to the newly established University of London as a preparatory college. In 1862, financial difficulties caused Fitzsimons to terminate his connection with Springfield, and under his successor the college changed direction sharply. The affiliation with the University of London was dropped for one with Newman's Catholic University in Dublin. Fitzsimons embarked on a new career in Argentina, where within the space of a few years he set up four schools. He died there in 1871 during an outbreak of yellow fever.

In 1865 the diocese broke with Springfield altogether and set up a diocesan college completely under its control at #12 Bindon Street, now a solicitor's office, and soon after became known as St. Flannan's Literary Institute, under a clerical headmaster, known for the first time as a president. The following year, the institute was able to acquire the Springfield premises after the school there closed. After a comparatively short interval, a search was begun to find a site on which a larger college campus could be developed. Work finally began in 1879 on land acquired on the Limerick Road, and the college was built to a rather severe neo-Gothic design. Financial problems occasioned by the bankruptcy of the builder led to alterations in the plans, and some of the finishing touches were postponed, never to be completed. Visitors to the college are often shown such features as the plain uncarved label stops around the Gothic windows and the Clock Tower, with no clock — all now part of the fabric of college tradition.

Perhaps the most famous president of the college was Canon William Kennedy, head of St. Flannan's between 1919 and 1932. During the Anglo-Irish War, the college was a hotbed of separatist sentiment, from where the Canon personally organised the collection of the famous Dáil Loan in Clare. Still preserved in the college are letters from both Éamon de Valera and Michael Collins in connection with this undertaking. Canon Kennedy was arrested in July 1921 by British forces and interned on Bere Island. The early decades of the new state were grim as only limited funding was available for secondary education, and most costs had to be met out from the college's resources alone, but some curriculum development did take place. In 1937, for example, Physics was introduced as a subject for the Leaving Certificate, remaining for many years the only science subject available at that level.

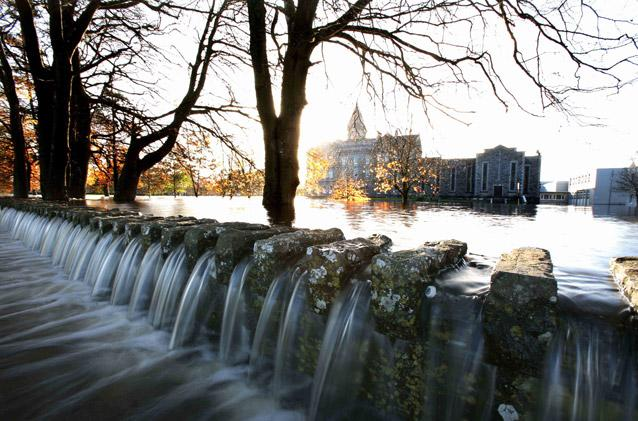
St.Flannan's submerged in water (2009)

The measure of the expansion that has taken place over the past thirty years is considerable; in 1962 there were some 370 pupils in St. Flannan's (140 of whom were day boys) and only 17 teachers. By 2004, the numbers had risen to more than 1,000 students and staff numbers had risen to 66. In September 2002, Coed classes were introduced in First Year. In September 2003, a new wing containing new facilities was opened. The college experienced very severe flooding in November 2009: much of the college grounds was submerged, and water breached the perimeter wall because of a small stream that runs underneath the college.

== Ranking ==
St Flannan's was ranked third in Ireland according to one of the most comprehensive league tables, published in The Irish Times, to date. The table was compiled by a research team at the University of Ulster and the Kemmy Business School at the University of Limerick in 2009.

== Notable staff ==
- Gary Brennan - the Clare dual player teaches P.E. and Irish
- Jamesie O'Connor - the Clare hurler teaches business studies
- Thomas McRedmond - the first president of the Diocesan College in 1866, later Bishop of Killaloe
- Willie Walsh - the future bishop joined the staff in 1963

== Notable past pupils ==
Academia

- Nicholas Canny – NUI Galway Professor Emeritus of History

Clergy

- Rev. Harry Bohan – priest and former manager of the Clare hurling team
- Rev. Austin Flannery OP – Dominican priest
- Rev. Thomas Flynn – Columban priest murdered in the Philippines
- Bishop Michael Fogarty – Professor in Carlow College & Maynooth College, Bishop of Killaloe (1904–54)
- Bishop Michael Harty – served as Bishop of Killaloe (1967–1994)
- Bishop Denis Kelly – served as Bishop of Ross (1897–1924)
- Bishop John McCarthy DD (1858-1950) – served as Bishop of Sandhurst in Victoria, Australia (1917–1950)
- Bishop Joseph Rodgers – served as Bishop of Killaloe (1955–1966)
- Bishop Willie Walsh – served as Bishop of Killaloe (1994–2010)

Politics

- Sylvester Barrett – former Minister for Environment, Minister for Defence and MEP (Fianna Fáil)
- Michael D. Higgins – former Minister for Arts, Culture and the Gaeltacht and ninth President of Ireland (Labour Party)
- Tony Killeen – former Minister for Defence (Fianna Fáil)
- Tomás Mac Giolla – former Lord Mayor of Dublin, former TD and former President of the Workers' Party
- Michael O'Kennedy – former Minister for Foreign Affairs, Minister for Finance, Minister for Agriculture, and European Commissioner (Fianna Fáil)
- Pat Upton – former Labour TD and Senator

Sport

- Anthony Daly – Dublin GAA senior hurling manager and double All-Ireland winning captain
- Jamesie O'Connor – Double All-Ireland winner, former GAA TV pundit on TV3, current hurling analyst on Sky Sports
- Davy Fitzgerald – Double All-Ireland winning goalkeeper, All-Ireland winning manager with Clare senior hurling team and current Wexford hurling manager
- Ger Loughnane – All-Ireland winning manager, GAA TV pundit on RTÉ's The Sunday Game

Television

- Maurice O'Doherty – Irish broadcaster best known as a newsreader for RTÉ News from 1966 until 1983
- Seán Munsanje – TV presenter
- Marty Morrissey – sports presenter

Military

- Seán Clancy – Chief of Staff of the Irish Defence Forces
