= Michael Fogarty (bishop) =

Irish Roman Catholic prelate

The Most Reverend Michael Fogarty D.D.
- Archbishop of Killaloe
- Church: Roman Catholic
- Diocese: Killaloe
- Installed: 4 September 1904
- Term ended: 25 October 1955
- Predecessor: Thomas McRedmond
- Successor: Joseph Rodgers
- Previous posts: Lecturer at Saint Patrick’s College, Maynooth and Saint Patrick's, Carlow College

Orders
- Ordination: 13 September 1885
- Consecration: 4 September 1904 by Thomas Fennelly

Personal details
- Born: 12 October 1859 Kilcolman, Youghalarra, County Tipperary, United Kingdom of Great Britain and Ireland
- Died: 25 October 1955 (aged 96) Ennis, County Clare, Ireland
- Buried: Cathedral of Saints Peter and Paul, Ennis, County Clare, Ireland
- Education: Saint Patrick’s College, Maynooth

Michael Fogarty (11 October 1859 – 26 October 1955) was an Irish Roman Catholic prelate who served as Bishop of Killaloe between 1904 and 1955. He was made archbishop ad personam in 1954.

== Early life ==
Fogarty was born on 11 October 1859 in Kilcolman, in the parish of Youghalarra, near Nenagh, County Tipperary, one of seven children to Matthew and Mary Fogarty.

He attended primary school in Kilcolman National School and secondary school in St Flannan's College, before entering St Patrick's College, Maynooth, in September 1878. Known to have a wide range of academic interests, Fogarty was considered to be an outstanding student, being awarded distinctions in elocution, French, mathematics, natural philosophy and metaphysics.

He was ordained to the priesthood on 13 September 1885. His brother, Daniel, was also ordained to the priesthood, and died on 8 January 1903.

== Presbyteral ministry ==
Following his ordination, Fogarty's first appointment was as a curate in Toomevara.

He was appointed professor of philosophy and canon law in St Patrick's, Carlow College in 1886 and subsequently as professor of dogmatic and moral theology in St Patrick's College, Maynooth in 1890. His professorships were notable for his clarity of expression and depth of knowledge, with no subject being considered too unfathomable for his penetrating brain.

Fogarty was appointed as vice-president of St Patrick's College, Maynooth, on 13 October 1903.

== Episcopal ministry ==
=== Bishop of Killaloe ===
Following the death of Thomas McRedmond on 5 April 1904, Fogarty was appointed Bishop of Killaloe by Pope Pius X on 8 July. He was consecrated by the Archbishop of Cashel-Emly, Thomas Fennelly, on 4 September in the Pro-Cathedral of Saints Peter and Paul, Ennis.

During his episcopate, Fogarty involved himself closely in the social and political challenges facing Ireland, frequently speaking out against landlordism and supporting tenant ownership and agricultural self-sufficiency. He also intervened in labour disputes in the early part of his episcopate, intervening in the West Clare Railway strike in 1910.

Fogarty was also known for his oratory skills, and was chosen to give the graveside oration at the burial of the Bishop of Limerick, Edward O'Dwyer, in May 1917.

While it was said that he disapproved of the Easter Rising, Fogarty signed the 1917 manifesto against the partition of Ireland, and later protested against the "hideous atrocities" perpetrated by the triumph of British culture on Irish nationalists. He also shared a platform with Éamon de Valera in the 1917 East Clare by-election campaign, and in the lead-up to the 1918 general election decried the threat of conscription being introduced to Ireland, insisting that the Irish were "not slaves" of the British Empire. Fogarty developed a close relationship with the first President of the Executive Council, W. T. Cosgrave.

In 1919, Fogarty purchased Westbourne House on the western outskirts of Ennis, for use as a residence for him and his successors.

As well as acting as a trustee for the first Dáil loan in December 1920, he held talks on peace proposals in Dublin with the Archbishop of Perth and Clare native, Patrick Clune, during what was regarded as an assassination attempt by Black and Tans who attacked his Westbourne residence in Ennis. On the evening of 2 December, Fogarty received a telegram from the Archbishop of Melbourne, Daniel Mannix, asking him to meet Clune in All Hallows College on 4 December, to which he reluctantly agreed. He set off on 3 December, staying the night in St John's Hospital, Limerick, while four auxiliaries of the Black and Tans raided Westbourne with the intent "to take [his] body, carry [him] off, and, according to General Crozier, bury [his] body in the Shannon".

Fogarty's Lenten pastoral letter in 1921 stayed true to the republican position, insisting that Irish nationalists only had to "remain steadfast to win" a united Ireland, and that "anyone who knows the psychology of the Irish people is well aware that brute force will never appease them nor intimidate them into surrender of their national rights".

While he was a vocal supporter of republicans during the War of Independence, Fogarty surprised many by supporting the Anglo-Irish Treaty, insisting that rejecting it would be "an act of national madness", and later insisting in his Lenten pastoral letter in 1922 that the problem of partition would be solved in time. Writing to the rector of the Irish College in Rome, Patrick Hagan, he criticised anti-Treaty propaganda, suggesting that voters should "pay no attention to all the talk about surrendering their birthright", for "they know their own minds".

Although his interest in politics receded after independence, Fogarty is believed to have found it difficult to forgive de Valera for his actions during the Civil War, criticising the Anglo-Irish trade war that followed Fianna Fáil's victory in the 1932 general election as "tariff madness".

Fogarty unveiled a memorial to Arthur Griffith, Michael Collins and Kevin O'Higgins in Dublin in 1951, paying generous tribute to their role in the foundation of the Irish state. He was also known to be a passionate horseman, cattle breeder and agriculturist, winning prizes at agricultural shows throughout the country for his horticultural produce.

=== Archbishop ===
On 8 July 1954, in recognition of his long and distinguished episcopate, Fogarty was honoured with the "privileges and honours of bishops assisting at the pontifical throne" and conferred with the title of archbishop ad personam by Pope Pius XII.

Fogarty celebrated the golden jubilee of his episcopate on 29 August 1954, itself an almost unique event in the history of the church. It was considered to be the most magnificent religious spectacle ever seen in Ennis, with guests including the Primacy of All Ireland, John d'Alton, and President Seán T. O'Kelly among those who participated in festivities marking the occasion. The people of Ennis honoured the occasion by erecting a statue of the Virgin Mary in the grounds of the Pro-Cathedral.

He had the longest episcopate in the recent history of the Catholic hierarchy in Ireland, and it was only towards the end of his life that he availed of the assistance of a coadjutor bishop, to which Joseph Rodgers was appointed on 10 January 1948. Rodgers lived at Ashline House on the Kilrush Road in Ennis, which had been made available for him by Fogarty by means of an eviction.

== Death and burial ==
Fogarty died at his Westbourne residence in Ennis on 25 October 1955. He is buried in the grounds of the Cathedral of Saints Peter and Paul, Ennis.

Catholic Church titles
Preceded by Thomas McRedmond	Bishop of Killaloe; 1904–1955	Succeeded by Joseph Rodgers
