= Willie Walsh (bishop) =

Irish Roman Catholic prelate (1935–2025)

The Most Reverend, Dr. William Walsh DCL
- Bishop of Killaloe
- Church: Roman Catholic
- Diocese: Killaloe
- Appointed: 8 August 1994
- Installed: 2 October 1994
- Term ended: 18 May 2010
- Predecessor: Michael Harty
- Successor: Kieran O'Reilly
- Previous posts: Coadjutor Bishop of the Diocese of Killaloe; Administrator at Ennis Cathedral; Teacher at St Flannan's College and Coláiste Éinde

Orders
- Ordination: 21 February 1959 by Luigi Traglia
- Consecration: 2 October 1994 by Dermot Clifford

Personal details
- Born: 16 January 1935 Roscrea, County Tipperary, Ireland
- Died: 19 February 2025 (aged 90) Ennis, County Clare, Ireland
- Education: Saint Patrick’s College, Maynooth; Pontifical Irish College; Pontifical Lateran University
- Motto: Cineáltas Chríost (The gentleness of Christ)

Styles of Willie Walsh
- Reference style: The Most Reverend
- Spoken style: Your Grace
- Religious style: Bishop

William Walsh (16 January 1935 – 19 February 2025) was an Irish Roman Catholic prelate who served as Bishop of Killaloe between 1994 and 2010.

== Early life ==
Walsh was born in Glenbeha, Roscrea, County Tipperary on 16 January 1935, the youngest of six children to William and Ellen Walsh. He attended primary school in Corville National School and Roscrea Boys National School and secondary school as a boarder in St Flannan's College, where he sat his Leaving Certificate in 1952.

Walsh won a scholarship to St Patrick's College, Maynooth, obtaining a bachelor's degree in science while studying for the priesthood. He completed his theology studies at the Pontifical Irish College, Rome, and was ordained to the priesthood by Archbishop Luigi Traglia on 21 February 1959 in the Archbasilica of Saint John Lateran.

== Presbyteral ministry ==
Following his ordination, Walsh returned to the Pontifical Lateran University to complete a doctorate in canon law. On his return to Ireland in 1962, he was appointed to the staff of Coláiste Éinde, Salthill, while studying for a higher diploma in education at University College, Galway.

Walsh was appointed to the staff of St Flannan's College in 1963, where he taught mathematics, science, physics and religion. He was also involved in the foundation of the Catholic Marriage Advisory Council in the Diocese of Killaloe in 1970, working with marriage tribunals at diocesan, regional and national levels. He was involved in coaching hurling teams at all levels, coaching St Flannan's College to five Dr Harty Cup and Dr Croke Cup titles between 1976 and 1987, and Éire Óg to the Clare Senior Hurling Championship in 1990.

Walsh was appointed curate at Ennis Cathedral in 1988, and subsequently administrator in 1990, a position he held until his appointment as coadjutor bishop of Killaloe on 21 June 1994. Following the sudden death of Michael Harty on 8 August 1994, Walsh succeeded to the see, and was ordained as Bishop of Killaloe by the Archbishop of Cashel-Emly, Dermot Clifford, on 2 October in the Cathedral of Saints Peter and Paul, Ennis.

== Episcopal ministry ==
Bishop Walsh came to national attention in 1998, when he allowed a Traveller family to set up home on the grounds of his Westbourne residence in Ennis. Four years later, he gave refuge to more than 50 Travellers who were being moved on from an illegal encampment by letting them move onto the grounds of Westbourne, after Gardaí in the town began removing caravans from public areas.

As part of Jubilee 2000, Walsh began a three-week Pilgrimage of Reconciliation across the Diocese of Killaloe on 30 November 1999. Addressing pilgrims in Newmarket-on-Fergus on 8 December, he told them that the pilgrimage was a way of "recognising, acknowledging, painful though it may be, serious wrongs have been done, and deep hurts have been caused by people working with our church down the years".

In 2002, he was the first senior figure in the Catholic Church in Ireland to publicly acknowledge that bishops had prioritised the protection of the institution over the protection of children. Five years later, abuse survivors' support group One in Four commended Walsh for showing “tremendous courage” in his approach to the issue of child abuse, noting how he had acted “way beyond [the practice of] any bishops” on the issue since as far back as 1995.

Addressing the Association of European Journalists in Dublin in November 2009, Walsh spoke of the past oppressive influence of the Church, adding that the big challenge for media today is how not to use its influence as a means of oppression.

== Personal views ==
Both during his episcopate and in retirement, Walsh expressed personal views on issues that are considered at odds with official church teaching.

In November 2009, he openly challenged a Papal ban on discussions surrounding the ordination of women, while on another occasion, he challenged the practice of closed communion in the Catholic Church, which almost completely excluded Protestants from receiving the Eucharist. Walsh stated that he had never suggested to members of the Church of Ireland that they were not welcome to receive the sacrament in his churches.

In an interview with The Irish Times in November 2010, Walsh expressed personal views on key issues such as homosexuality, birth control and family planning, the ordination of women, clerical celibacy and the existence of the afterlife. He asserted to have been "stunned" upon hearing about the publication of Humanae vitae, a document reaffirming traditional church teaching on family planning, in 1968, saying that "[that] was a watershed. Up to that time, I think, practically all Catholics accepted that, whether they disobeyed Catholic teaching or not, the teaching was right. It was there that the questioning began."

At a civic reception held in his honour in July 2010, Walsh expressed his sadness at the deep hurt caused to homosexuals, saying that they deserved to be treated "with the deep respect to which every human being is entitled".

Following the passing of a referendum permitting same-sex marriage in the Republic of Ireland on 22 May 2015, Walsh said that he could not support remarks made by Cardinal Secretary of State Pietro Parolin labelling the result as "not only a defeat for Christian principles, but also a defeat for humanity", and seriously doubted that Parolin's sentiments were shared by Pope Francis.

In an interview on Newstalk's The Pat Kenny Show on 30 August 2021, Walsh opined that land owned by the Catholic Church was owned by the people and should be made available for housing if necessary.

=== Clerical sex abuse ===
==== Ryan Report ====
Following the publication of the Ryan Report on 20 May 2009, Walsh said it would be "a second injustice [in addition to the abuse of children] if the religious alone were singled out to carry all the blame. All adults share some responsibility (for what went on then), but they didn't want to know."

==== Murphy Report ====
Following the publication of the Murphy Report on 26 November 2009, Walsh called on Cardinal Desmond Connell to issue a statement. Connell released "a personal statement" on 26 November, noting that it had been "severely critical of the diocesan response (to abuse allegations), particularly in [his] earlier years in office", expressing his "distress and bewilderment" that priests could behave in such a way. He also wished "to express without reservation [his] bitter regret that failures on [his] part contributed to the suffering of victims in any form", apologising to those hurt and asking forgiveness.

The report also heavily criticised Donal Murray for his actions during his time as an auxiliary bishop in the Archdiocese of Dublin. Walsh opined that calls for Murray to resign as Bishop of Limerick were based on a "gross misreading" of the report on the Archdiocese of Dublin, stating his discomfort with a public trial and questioning whether calls for Murray's resignation were about healing for survivors or a desire for a need "to get a head on a plate". In an interview on RTÉ Radio 1's Morning Ireland on 30 November, he also admitted that he hadn't had time to examine the report in detail, "but I do know, I do know for a fact, some of the interpretation put on that and being placed against Bishop Murray is a misreading of the report. I do know that from somebody who has read in detail the report and I am satisfied with that."

In an interview on Clare FM's Morning Focus on 1 December, Walsh broke down and cried after saying he didn't want to pass judgment onto others. He admitted his remark about a "head on a plate" was an unfortunate phrase that came across the wrong way, and apologised unreservedly for any hurt caused.

Walsh said that the crisis in the Church was also a time of opportunity to remove what was wrong in the past, adding that every crisis "is also an opportunity, an opportunity for serious change, to begin again, to renew our faith, our hope and indeed our love." He wept openly after a parish priest declared the people's love for him at the blessing and dedication of a new adoration chapel in Shannon. Fr. Tom Ryan told Walsh, "we love you", and thanked him for his fifteen years of inspirational leadership on both a diocesan and a national level.

==== "John's" allegations ====
An anonymous complainant, "John", alleged that he had been raped by three priests, Frs. T, U and V, in the early 1980s, and had been told by Walsh in 2005 to report the incidents to the police. Walsh had paid "John" €20,000 personally, as well as €45,000 out of diocesan funds in 2008 and 2009 – though Walsh said he never formally sought compensation – and promised to seek a further €30,000 from the diocese and the alleged offending priests in 2010. Walsh himself believed "John"'s story, saying that Fr. T was "the worst offender in that he started it. But the other two did worse". The three priests had been in the same class at St Patrick's College, Maynooth as "John", who alleged that his attempt to complain about them to then-President of the college, Msgr. Micheál Ledwith, had been brushed off.

The McCullough Report had investigated and dismissed claims of homosexual behaviour at the college.

== Retirement and death ==
In accordance with canon law, Walsh submitted his episcopal resignation to the Congregation for Bishops on his 75th birthday on 16 January 2010, but was expected to remain in the see until a successor was appointed.

At a civic reception held in Ennis honouring his service on 26 March 2010, Walsh received a standing ovation and said that the position of Irish bishops was hazardous for sad reasons, and at risk from mistakes made up to 50 years previously. Reflecting on his time as bishop, he found it a heavy responsibility, but tried to be open, honest and transparent at all times, and hoped that he managed to get to the end of it. Walsh said he was "very honoured and chuffed" to be granted the civic reception "in a town... that has given [him] so much".

Walsh remained in the see until the appointment of his successor, Kieran O'Reilly, on 18 May 2010.

He published a book of memoirs called No Crusader in 2016.

Walsh died suddenly at his residence in Ennis, on 19 February 2025, at the age of 90.

His funeral Mass took place on 24 February in the Cathedral of Saints Peter and Paul, Ennis, with burial afterwards in the cathedral grounds.

== Bibliography ==
- Walsh, Willie (2016). No Crusader. Columba Press. ISBN 9781782182535.

== See also ==
Catholic Church titles
Preceded by Michael Harty	Bishop of Killaloe; 2 October 1994 – 18 May 2010	Succeeded by Kieran O'Reilly
