= Flannán =

7th-century Irish saint

Saint Flannan
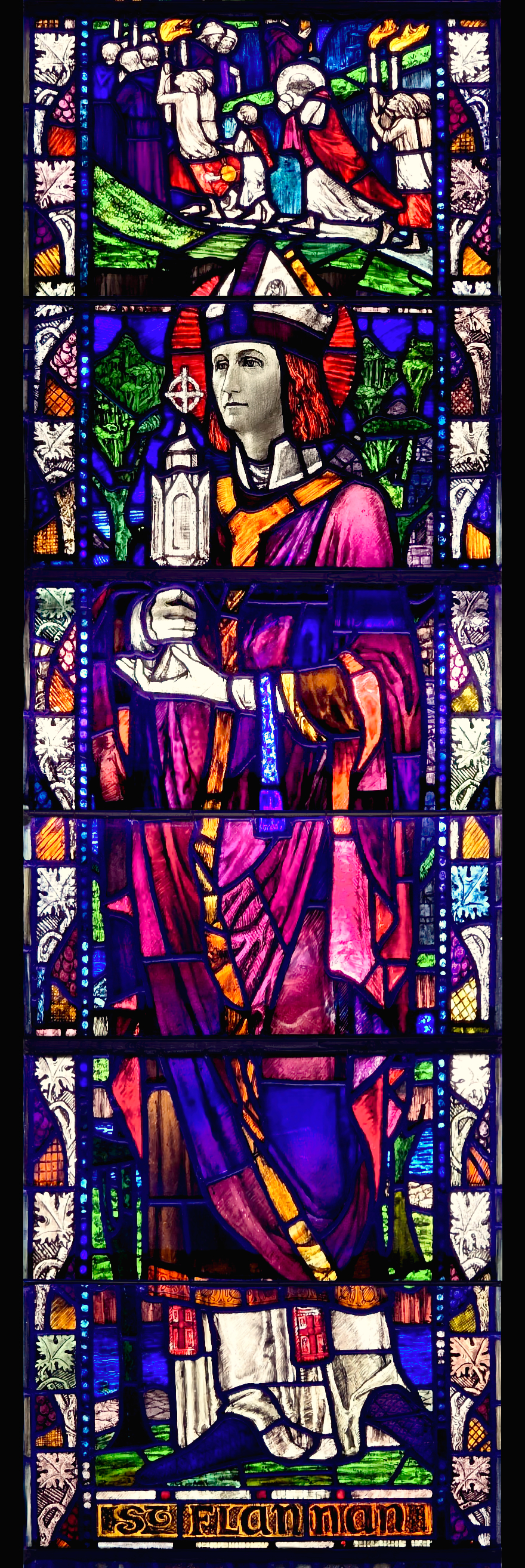
- St Flannan by Catherine O'Brien at the Honan Chapel

Abbot and Bishop of Killaloe
- Born: 6th-7th century Kingdom of Munster
- Died: 7th-8th century Killaloe, Munster
- Venerated in: Roman Catholic Church; Eastern Orthodox Church
- Feast: 18 December

Flannán mac Toirrdelbaig (Latin: Flannanus; fl. 640) was an Irish saint who lived in the 7th century and was the son of an Irish chieftain, Toirdhealbhach of Dál gCais. He entered Mo Lua's monastery at Killaloe, where it is believed he became an Abbot. He is remembered as a great preacher. He made a pilgrimage to Rome where Pope John IV consecrated him as the first Bishop of Killaloe, of which he is the Patron Saint. He also preached in the Hebrides. His feast day is 18 December.

== See also ==
- Roman Catholic Diocese of Killaloe
- Diocese of Limerick and Killaloe (Church of Ireland)
- St. Flannan's College
- Flannan Isles
