= Joseph Rodgers (bishop) =

Irish Roman Catholic prelate

The Most Reverend Joseph Rodgers D.D.
- Bishop of Killaloe
- Church: Roman Catholic
- Diocese: Killaloe
- Appointed: 25 October 1955
- Installed: 29 October 1955
- Term ended: 9 July 1966
- Predecessor: Michael Fogarty
- Successor: Michael Harty
- Previous posts: Coadjutor Bishop of the Diocese of Killaloe; Titular Bishop of Sebela; Teacher at Saint Flannan's College

Orders
- Ordination: 20 June 1927
- Consecration: 7 March 1948 by Jeremiah Kinane

Personal details
- Born: 25 March 1903 Liss, Killanena, County Clare, Ireland
- Died: 9 July 1966 (aged 63) Ennis, Ireland
- Buried: Cathedral of Saints Peter and Paul, Ennis, County Clare, Ireland
- Education: Saint Patrick’s College, Maynooth

Joseph Rodgers (25 March 1903 – 10 July 1966) was an Irish Roman Catholic prelate who served as Bishop of Killaloe between 1955 and 1966.

== Early life ==
Rodgers was born in Liss, in the parish of Killanena, County Clare, on 25 March 1903. He attended secondary school in St Flannan's College between 1915 and 1920.

Rodgers entered St Patrick's College, Maynooth in September 1920, and was ordained to the priesthood in the College Chapel, Maynooth, County Kildare, on 19 June 1927.

== Presbyteral ministry ==
Following his ordination, Rodgers returned to St Flannan's College as a teacher.

He also obtained a Doctorate in Divinity.

== Episcopal ministry ==
=== Coadjutor Bishop of Killaloe ===
Rodgers was named coadjutor bishop of Killaloe and titular bishop of Sebela on 10 January 1948, and was consecrated by the Archbishop of Cashel-Emly, Jeremiah Kinane, on 7 March in the Pro-Cathedral of Saints Peter and Paul, Ennis.

During his coadjutorship, he lived at Ashline House on the Kilrush Road in Ennis, which had been made available for him by the incumbent, Michael Fogarty, by means of an eviction.

=== Bishop of Killaloe ===
Following the death of Fogarty on 25 October 1955, Rodgers succeeded him as Bishop of Killaloe on 29 October.

He participated in all four sessions of the Second Vatican Council.

==== Clonlara affair controversy ====
In May 1956, two members of Jehovah's Witnesses were attacked in Doonass, near Clonlara, County Clare, which led to a district court case in Limerick at which local curate Fr. Patrick Ryan and nine of his parishioners were charged with assaulting the two members and maliciously damaging IR£3 worth of books, Bibles and other literature being distributed by them. All charges made against Ryan and his parishioners were dropped, in part due to an intervention on the part of Rodgers, who was present at the trial.

The presiding judge declared that the two Jehovah’s Witnesses had been "guilty of blasphemy", and that they had "come into this village [of Clonlara] and attack and outrage all that these simple Irishmen hold dear. I think the two men were lucky to escape so lightly."

Rodgers was so outraged by the whole affair that he wrote to the then Taoiseach, John A. Costello, expressing his anger that the Attorney General could proceed with the case "against one of [his priests] for upholding and defending the fundamental truths of our treasured Catholic faith", given the "pernicious and blasphemous literature distributed and sold in [his] diocese" by the two members. While Costello was not unmindful of "the just indignation aroused among the clergy and the people by the activities of the Jehovah’s Witnesses", he insisted that the law had to be upheld.

== Death and burial ==
Rodgers took a walk in the garden of his Westbourne residence in Ennis on the evening of 10 July 1966, but suffered a heart attack and was found dead the following morning.

He is buried in the grounds of the Cathedral of Saints Peter and Paul, Ennis.

Catholic Church titles
Preceded by Michael Fogarty	Bishop of Killaloe; 1955–1966	Succeeded by Michael Harty
