= Bishop of Killaloe =

Diocesan bishop in Ireland

The Bishop of Killaloe (/ˌkɪləˈluː/ kil-ə-LOO) is an episcopal title which takes its name after the town of Killaloe in County Clare, Ireland. In the Roman Catholic Church it remains a separate title, but in the Church of Ireland it has been united with other bishoprics.

== History ==
The Diocese of Killaloe was one of the twenty-four dioceses established at the Synod of Rathbreasail in 1111. The boundaries of the diocese consisted of almost all of County Clare, the northern part of County Tipperary and the western part of County Offaly. Its Irish name is Cill-da-lua (Church of Lua), so named from St Mo Lua, an abbot who lived in the late 6th century. At the Synod of Kells in March 1152, Killaloe some lost territory when the dioceses of Kilfenora, Roscrea and Scattery Island were created.

Following the Reformation, there are now parallel Killaloe dioceses: one of the Church of Ireland and the other of the Roman Catholic Church.

In Church of Ireland

The pre-Reformation Cathedral Church of St Flannan, Killaloe continued as the Church of Ireland bishop's seat (cathedra). The Church of Ireland title was united with Kilfenora in 1752, and again with Clonfert & Kilmacduagh in 1834. Since 1976, it has been part of the united bishopric of Limerick and Killaloe.

In the Roman Catholic Church

The Roman Catholic bishop's seat is located at St Peter and St Paul Cathedral in Ennis, County Clare. The current bishop of the Roman Catholic Diocese of Killaloe is the Most Reverend Fintan Monahan who succeeded on 25 September 2016.

== Pre-Reformation bishops ==
Pre-Reformation Bishops of Killaloe
From	Until	Incumbent	Notes
unknown	1098	Domnall Ua hÉnna I	died 1 December 1098
dates unknown		Gilla Pátrick Ua hÉnna	
unknown	1131	Domnall Ua Conaing ^{[A]}	translated to Cashel in 1131
c. 1131	c. 1137/38	Domnall Ua Lonngargáin ^{[B]}	translated to Cashel c. 1137 or 1138
c. 1138	1161	Tadg Ua Lonngargáin	died in office
c. 1161	1164	Donnchad mac Diarmata Ua Briain	died in office
bef. 1179	1194	Constantín mac Toirrdelbaig Ua Briain	died in office
1194	1195	Diarmait Ua Conaing	died in office
bef. 1201	1216	Conchobhar Ua h-Énna	died in office; also known as Cornelius
1216	unknown	Domnall Ua h-Énna II	elected 1216; confirmed by Pope Honorius III 1219; consecrated 1221; also known as Donatus
1217	1221/26	Robert Travers	elected before 14 January 1217; consecrated after 14 January 1217; deprived 1221, and again May 1226
1231	1252	Donat O'Kennedy	elected before 1231; died before 1252; also known as Donatus
1253	1267	Ísóc Ó Cormacáin	elected before 5 April 1253; appointed and consecration 23 June 1253; resigned before 10 November 1267; also known as Isaac
1268	1281	Mathgamain Ó h-Ócáin	elected before 20 March 1268; died 12 August 1281; also known as Matthaeus
1281	1298	Mauricius Ó h-Ócáin	elected 23 November 1281; died before October 1298
1299	1317	David Mac Mathghamna	elected 7 January 1299; consecrated May 1299; died 9 February 1317; also known as David Mac Mahon
1317	1322	Tomás Ó Cormacáin I	elected before 2 July 1317; died 31 July 1322
1323	c. 1325	Brian Ó Coscraig	elected before 1 August 1323; died c. 1325; also known as Benedictus
1326	1342	David Mac Briain	elected before May 1326; appointed 25 May 1326; died 12 December 1342; also known as 'David of Emly'
? 1326	1334	Unatus O Heime	possibly elected in 1326; died 1334; also may known as Uaithne Ó hÉnna
unknown	1354	Tomás Ó h-Ógáin	died 30 October 1354
1355	1382	Tomás Ó Cormacáin II	elected before May 1355; appointed 27 May 1355; died 1382
1389	1400	Mathghamhain Mág Raith	appointed before August 1398; died before February 1400; also known as Matthaeus
1400	1421	Donatus Mág Raith, O.S.A.	appointed before 8 February 1400; consecrated before 9 April 1400; died after August 1421
1409		Robert Mulfield, O.Cist.	appointed 9 September 1409, but did not get possession; acted as a suffragan bishop in the Diocese of Lichfield c. 1418 to 1440
1418	1431	Eugenius Ó Faoláin	translated from Kilmacduagh; resident in a portion of the diocese; died before 24 July 1431
1423	1443	Thaddaeus Mág Raith I	appointed 25 October 1423; consecrated after 5 November 1423; died before July 1443
1429	1443	Séamus Ó Lonnghargáin	translated from Annaghdown 9 December 1429; consecrated c. December 1429; resigned c. July 1443
1443	1460	Donnchadh mac Toirdhealbhaigh Ó Briain	appointed 26 July 1443; consecrated after 12 August 1443; died before August 1460
1460	1463	Thaddaeus Mág Raith II	appointed 18 August 1460; consecrated 2 September 1460; died before May 1463
1463	1483	Matthaeus Ó Gríobhtha	appointed 23 May 1463; consecrated after 7 July 1463; died c. September 1483
1483	1526	Toirdhealbhach mac Mathghamhna Ó Briain	appointed 19 September 1483; died before August 1526; also known as Theodoricus or Thaddaeus
1526	1542	Séamus Ó Cuirrín	appointed 24 August 1526; swore the Oath of Supremacy at Clonmel early in 1539; resigned 5 May 1542; died before June 1554; also known as James O'Currin

== Post-Reformation bishops ==
=== Church of Ireland bishops ===
Church of Ireland Bishops of Killaloe
From	Until	Incumbent	Notes
1546	c. 1554	Cornelius O'Dea	nominated by King Henry VIII 30 May 1546; consecrated 12 July 1546; died between 1568 and 1576
1554	1569	Turlough O'Brien ^{[C]}	appointed bishop of both successions on 25 June 1554 when they were temporarily reunited under Queen Mary I; in a letter of 12 October 1561, the papal legate Fr David Wolfe SJ described all the bishops in Munster as 'adherents of the Queen'; died 1569; also known as Terence O'Brien
1570	1612	Murtogh O'Brien-Arra	nominated 17 May 1570. Queen Elizabeth I ordered the revenues of the see to be allowed to him until he should be old enough to be consecrated. In 1575, the queen still considered he was too young. He resigned in 1612 and died 30 April 1632
1612	1632	John Rider	nominated 5 July 1612; consecrated 12 January 1613; died 12 November 1632
1633	1646	Lewis Jones	previously Dean of Cashel (1607–33); nominated 14 December 1632; consecrated 12 April 1633; died 2 November 1646; buried at St Werburgh's Church, Dublin
1647	1650	Edward Parry	nominated 29 December 1646; consecrated 28 March 1647; died of the plague in Dublin 20 July 1650 and buried at St. Audoen's Church, Dublin.
1650	1660	See vacant	
1660	1669	Edward Worth	native of County Cork; nominated 7 August 1660; consecrated 27 January 1661; died in Hackney 2 August 1669 and buried at St Mildred's Church, Bread Street, London
1669	1675	Daniel Witter	nominated 4 August and consecrated September 1669; died 16 March 1675
1675	1692	John Roan	a Welshman; nominated 28 March and consecrated June 1675; died 5 September 1692 and buried in Killaloe Cathedral
1693	1695	Henry Rider	nominated 13 May and consecrated 11 June 1693; died in Dublin 30 January 1696
1695	1713	Thomas Lindsay, D.D.	nominated 12 February and consecrated 22 March 1696; translated to Raphoe 6 June 1713, and subsequently to Armagh 4 January 1714
1713	1714	Sir Thomas Vesey, 1st Baronet	son of John Vesey, Archbishop of Tuam (1679–1716); nominated 11 May 1713 and consecrated 12 July 1713; translated to Ossory 28 April 1714
1714	1716	Nicholas Forster	senior Fellow of Trinity College Dublin; nominated bishop 7 October and consecrated 7 November 1714; translated from Killaloe to Raphoe.
1716	1739	Charles Carr, M.A.	previously chaplain of the Irish House of Commons; nominated bishop 26 May and consecrated in June 1716; died in Dublin on 26 December 1739
1740	1742	Joseph Story, M.A.	previously Dean of Ferns (1734–40); nominated 16 January and consecrated 10 February 1740; translated to Kilmore 29 January 1742
1742	1743	John Ryder, D.D.	nominated 18 January and consecrated 21 February 1742; translated to Down and Connor 1 August 1743
1743	1745	Jemmett Browne	previously Dean of Ross (1733–43); nominated 29 August and consecrated 9 October 1743; translated to Dromore 16 May 1745
1745	1746	Richard Chenevix, D.D.	nominated 26 April and consecrated 28 July 1745; translated to Waterford and Lismore 15 January 1746
1746	1752	Nicholas Synge, D.D.	nominated 23 December 1745 and consecrated 26 January 1746; became Bishop of Killaloe and Kilfenora in 1752
In 1752, the Church of Ireland see became the united bishopric of Killaloe and Kilfenora.

=== Roman Catholic succession ===
Roman Catholic Bishops of Killaloe
From	Until	Incumbent	Notes
appointed 1539		Richard Hogan, O.F.M.	appointed Apostolic Administrator of Killaloe (and Bishop of Clonmacnoise) 16 June 1539; died later in the same year
appointed 1539		Florence Kirwan, O.F.M.	appointed Apostolic Administrator of Killaloe (and Bishop of Clonmacnoise) 5 December 1539; died c. 1555
appointed 1542		Dermot O'Brien	appointed Apostolic Administrator of Killaloe 5 May 1542
1554	1569	Turlough O'Brien ^{[D]}	appointed bishop of both successions on 25 June 1554 when they were temporarily reunited under Queen Mary I; died 1569; also known as Terence O'Brien
1569	1571	See vacant	
1571	1576	Malachy O'Moloney	appointed 10 January 1571; translated to Kilmacduagh 22 August 1576
1576	1616	Cornelius O'Mulrian, O.F.M.	appointed 22 August 1576; died 1616; also known as Cornelius Ryan
1616	1619	See vacant	
1619	1630	Malachy O'Queely	appointed vicar apostolic to administer the see by Papal brief 30 August 1619; translated to Tuam 22 April 1630
1630	1651	John O'Mollony I	appointed 12 August 1630; consecrated in November 1630; died October 1651
appointed 1652		John O'Molony II	appointed vicar apostolic to administer the see by Papal brief 17 October 1652; afterwards became bishop in 1671
appointed 1657		Denis Harty	appointed vicar apostolic to administer the see by Papal brief 17 April 1657; also known as Dionysius Harty
appointed 1666		John de Burgo	formerly vicar apostolic of Cashel; appointed vicar apostolic to administer the see of Killaloe in 1666
appointed 1668		Denis Harty (again)	appointed vicar apostolic to administer the see of Killaoe again in August 1668
1671	1702	John O'Molony II	previously vicar apostolic of Killaloe; appointed bishop 26 May 1671; consecrated in March 1672; translated to Limerick 24 January 1698, although continued as Apostolic Administrator of Killaloe until his death on 3 September 1702
1702	1713	See vacant	
1713	1729	Eustace Browne	appointed 30 June and consecrated 16 August 1713; died c. 1729
1729	1739	Sylvester Lloyd, O.F.M.	appointed 25 September 1729; translated to Waterford 29 May 1739
1739	1752	Patrick MacDonogh	appointed 14 August 1739; died 25 February 1752
1752		Patrick O'Nachten	appointed 12 May 1752, but was not accepted
1752	1753	Nicholas Madgett	appointed 11 December 1752; consecrated 23 February 1753; translated to Ardfert and Aghadoe 23 February 1753
1753	1763	William O'Meara	translated from Ardfert and Aghadoe 23 February 1753; died after 1763
1763	1765	See vacant	
1765	1807	Michael Peter MacMahon, O.P.	appointed 5 June and consecrated 4 August 1765; died 20 February 1807
1807	1828	James O'Shaughnessy	appointed coadjutor bishop 23 September 1798; consecrated 13 January 1799; succeeded 20 February 1807; died 5 August 1828
1828	1836	Patrick MacMahon	appointed coadjutor bishop 8 August and consecrated 18 November 1819; succeeded 5 August 1828; died 7 June 1836
1836	1851	Patrick Kennedy	appointed coadjutor bishop 31 May 1835; consecrated 17 January 1836; succeeded 7 June 1836; died 19 November 1851
1851	1859	Daniel Vaughan	appointed 30 March and consecrated 8 June 1851; died 29 July 1859
1859	1891	Michael Flannery	appointed coadjutor bishop 6 July and consecrated 5 September 1858; succeeded 29 July 1859; died 19 June 1891
1891	1904	Thomas McRedmond	appointed coadjutor bishop September 1889; consecrated 12 January 1890; succeeded 19 June 1891; died 5 April 1904
1904	1955	Michael Fogarty (bishop)	appointed 8 July and consecrated 4 September 1904; died 25 October 1955
1955	1966	Joseph Rodgers	appointed coadjutor bishop 10 January and consecrated 7 March 1948; succeeded 25 October 1955; died 10 July 1966
1967	1994	Michael Anthony Harty	appointed 28 September and consecrated 19 November 1967; died 2 October 1994
1994	2010	William (Willie) Walsh	appointed coadjutor bishop of Killaloe on 21 June 1994; episcopal ordination 8 August 1994; succeeded 2 October 1994; retired 18 May 2010
2010	2014	Kieran O'Reilly, S.M.A.	appointed 18 May 2010 and received episcopal ordination on 29 August 2010; appointed Archbishop of Cashel & Emly on 22 November 2014 and installed to that see on 8 February 2015
2016	Incumbent	Fintan Monahan	Appointed 29 July 2016 and received episcopal ordination on 25 September 2016.

== Notes ==
- There is some doubt as to whether Ua Conaing ^{A} and Ua Lonngargáin ^{B} were Bishop of Killaloe as well as Archbishop of Cashel at the time of their death.
- ^{C} ^{D} Turlough O'Brien was bishop of both successions.
