= Sylvester Lloyd =

Welsh Franciscan bishop

Sylvester Lloyd, O.F.M. (1680–1747) was of Welsh descent and Protestant origins. In his youth he served in the Williamite army, but later was received into the Catholic Church where he trained as a Franciscan. He received priesthood education from English Franciscans in Douai College in France. He entered the monastery of the Order of St. Jerome in Lisbon that he was ordained on 30 May 1711.

He served as bishop of Killaloe (1728–1739) and subsequently of Waterford and Lismore (1739–1747). He was active but not particularly successful in drumming up support for the Jacobite cause in both Catholic and Protestant circles.

== Sources ==
Patrick Fagan: An Irish bishop of penal times: The chequered career of Sylvester Lloyd O.F.M., Dublin, Four courts Press, 2004
