= Michael Flannery (bishop) =

Roman-catholic bishop

- Bishop of Killaloe
- Church: Catholic Church
- Diocese: Diocese of Killaloe
- In office: 29 July 1859 – 19 June 1891
- Predecessor: Daniel Vaughan
- Successor: Thomas McRedmond
- Previous posts: Titular Bishop of Tiberiopolis (1858-1859); Coadjutor Bishop of Killaloe (1858-1859)

Orders
- Ordination: 5 January 1843
- Consecration: 5 September 1858 by Patrick Leahy

Personal details
- Born: 17 May 1818 Scariff, County Clare, United Kingdom of Great Britain and Ireland
- Died: 19 June 1891 (aged 73) Paris, France

Michael Flannery (b Scarriff 17 May 1818; d Paris 19 June 1891) was an Irish Roman Catholic clergyman who served as the Bishop of Killaloe from 1859 until his death.

Flannery was educated at St Patrick's Pontifical University, Maynooth. After a curacy at Cloughjordan he was on the staff of All Hallows College, Dublin from 1843 until 1858. He was Bishop of Killaloe from 1859 until his death.
