= Kieran O'Reilly (bishop) =

Irish Roman Catholic prelate

The Most Reverend Kieran O'Reilly SMA KC*HS
- Archbishop of Cashel and Emly
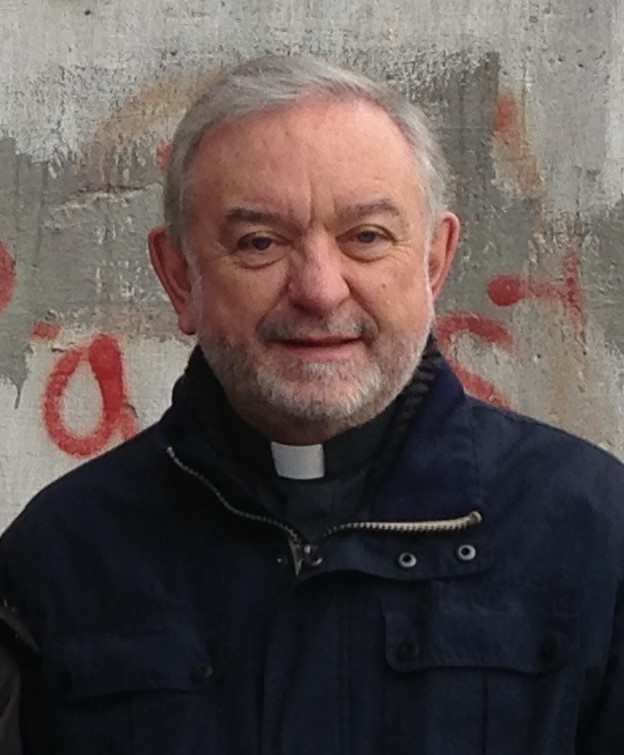
- O'Reilly in 2015
- Church: Roman Catholic
- Archdiocese: Cashel and Emly
- Appointed: 22 November 2014
- Installed: 8 February 2015
- Predecessor: Dermot Clifford
- Previous posts: Bishop of Killaloe; Superior General and Vicar General of the Society of African Missions

Orders
- Ordination: 17 June 1978
- Consecration: 29 August 2010 by Dermot Clifford

Personal details
- Born: 8 August 1952 (age 74) Cork, Ireland
- Education: Coláiste Chríost Rí; St Patrick's College, Maynooth; Pontifical Biblical Institute
- Motto: Verbum tuum veritas (Your word is truth)
- Coat of arms

Kieran Andrew O'Reilly SMA KC*HS (born 8 August 1952) is an Irish Roman Catholic prelate who has served as Archbishop of Cashel and Emly since 2015.

== Early life and education ==
O'Reilly was born in Cork on 8 August 1952, the first of five children to Seán and Theresa O'Reilly. He attended primary school in Scoil Chríost Rí and secondary school in Coláiste Chríost Rí, before entering the novitiate of the Society of African Missions in Wilton, Cork in 1970.

O'Reilly subsequently attended courses in philosophy and theology at St Patrick's College, Maynooth, being awarded bachelor's degrees in literature in 1974 and theology in 1977. He was later awarded a diploma in missionary studies in 1978. O'Reilly became a permanent member of the Society of African Missions by professing perpetual vows on 10 April 1977, and was ordained a priest on 17 June 1978.

== Presbyteral ministry ==
Following his ordination, O'Reilly served for two years in pastoral ministry in the Archdiocese of Monrovia, Liberia, before he was recalled two years later to undertake studies in sacred scripture at the Pontifical Biblical Institute in Rome, from where he was awarded a licentiate in 1984. He was then appointed Professor of Biblical Studies at the major seminary of Saints Peter and Paul in Ibadan, Nigeria, where he taught until 1988.

O'Reilly was elected to the Provincial Council of the Society of African Missions by members of the Society's Irish province in 1989, and subsequently appointed Vicar General of the Society in 1995. He was elected Superior General of the Society on 5 May 2001, the fourth Irishman to serve in this post, and re-elected in 2007.

== Episcopal ministry ==
=== Bishop of Killaloe ===
O'Reilly was appointed Bishop-elect of Killaloe by Pope Benedict XVI on 18 May 2010. He was consecrated by the Archbishop of Cashel-Emly, Dermot Clifford, on 29 August in the Cathedral of Saints Peter and Paul, Ennis.

He was a popular and accessible bishop with one only public controversy in August 2014, when men were invited to apply for a restoration of the Permanent Diaconate in the diocese. Women, "who do the majority of the work in the parishes", had been "hurt and greatly disappointed" by O'Reilly's male-only invitation, forcing him to decide to "not now proceed with the introduction of the permanent diaconate at this time".

=== Archbishop of Cashel and Emly ===
O'Reilly was appointed Archbishop-elect of Cashel and Apostolic Administrator-elect of Emly by Pope Francis on 22 November 2014. Following the formal union of the metropolitan see of Cashel with the diocese of Emly to form the Archdiocese of Cashel and Emly on 26 January 2015, he was installed as the first archbishop of the new archdiocese on 8 February, in the Cathedral of the Assumption, Thurles.

Catholic Church titles
Preceded by Willie Walsh	Bishop of Killaloe; 29 August 2010 – 8 February 2015	Succeeded by Fintan Monahan
Preceded by Dermot Clifford	Archbishop of Cashel and Emly since 8 February 2015	Succeeded by Incumbent
