= Fintan Monahan =

Bishop of Killaloe

The Most Reverend Fintan Monahan KC*HS
- Bishop of Killaloe
- Church: Roman Catholic
- Diocese: Killaloe
- Appointed: 29 July 2016
- Installed: 25 September 2016
- Predecessor: Kieran O'Reilly
- Previous posts: Diocesan Secretary of the Archdiocese of Tuam; Teacher and Chaplain at St Jarlath's College

Orders
- Ordination: 16 June 1991 by Joseph Cassidy
- Consecration: 25 September 2016 by Kieran O'Reilly

Personal details
- Born: 23 January 1967 (age 59) Tullamore, County Offaly, Ireland
- Education: St Patrick’s College, Maynooth; NUI Galway
- Motto: Críost liom, Críost romham (Christ with me, Christ before me)
- Coat of arms: Fintan Monahan's coat of arms

Ordination history of Fintan Monahan
History
Diaconal ordination
- Ordained by: Michael Smith
Priestly ordination
- Ordained by: Joseph Cassidy
Episcopal consecration
- Principal consecrator: Kieran O'Reilly
- Co-consecrators: Charles John Brown; Michael Neary

Styles of Fintan Monahan
- Reference style: The Most Reverend
- Spoken style: Your Grace
- Religious style: Bishop

Fintan Monahan KC*HS (born 23 January 1967) is an Irish Roman Catholic prelate who has served as Bishop of Killaloe since 2016.

== Early life ==
Monahan was born in Tullamore, County Offaly, on 23 January 1967, one of three children to Tom Monahan and his wife Peg (née Conneely). He moved with his family to An Cheathrú Rua, County Galway, in 1980 where his father was principal at Scoil Chuimsitheach Chiaráin, and subsequently to his mother's native Castlegar in 1996.

Monahan attended primary school in Tullamore and secondary school in Scoil Chuimhsotheach Chiaráin, An Cheathrú Rua, before studying for the priesthood in St Patrick's College, Maynooth, in 1984, completing a Bachelor of Science in NUI Maynooth, in 1987, and a Bachelor of Divinity in the Pontifical University in 1990.

He was ordained a priest for the Archdiocese of Tuam on 16 June 1991.

== Presbyteral ministry ==
Monahan's first pastoral assignment was as curate in An Tulach, Baile na hAbhann, between 1992 and 1993, during which he completed a licentiate in biblical theology in 1992 and a higher diploma in education from NUI Galway in 1993.

Between 1993 and 2006 he taught science, mathematics, Irish and religion at Saint Jarlath's College, Tuam, while also coaching basketball and hurling.

Monahan was appointed chaplain to Saint Jarlath's College and Assistant Diocesan Secretary of the Archdiocese of Tuam in 2006, before being appointed Diocesan Secretary in 2007, during which time he worked in the area of communications, promoting vocations, and editing the diocesan magazine, New Dawn. He was also appointed secretary of the diocesan finance committee, director of vocational pastoral care, and designate for child protection.

Monahan was appointed to the Council for Communications of the Irish Catholic Bishops' Conference in 2013.

== Episcopal ministry ==
Monahan was appointed Bishop-elect of Killaloe by Pope Francis on 29 July 2016. He was consecrated by his predecessor, the Archbishop of Cashel and Emly, Kieran O'Reilly, on 25 September in the Cathedral of Saints Peter and Paul, Ennis.

During his episcopate, Monahan has also authored a series of books on people whose lives and literary works have inspired him, namely John Henry Newman, Thomas Merton, C. S. Lewis and Pope Benedict XVI.

== Bibliography ==
- Monahan, Bishop Fintan (2019). A Perfect Peace: Newman, Saint for Our Time. Veritas. ISBN 9781847309341.
- Monahan, Bishop Fintan (2020). Peace Smiles: Rediscovering Thomas Merton. Veritas. ISBN 9781847309709.
- Monahan, Bishop Fintan (2022). Peace Apart: Lasting Impressions of C.S. Lewis. Veritas. ISBN 9781800970250.
- Monahan, Bishop Fintan (2023). His Homeward Journey: The Life and Works of Pope Benedict XVI. Veritas. ISBN 9781800970144.
- Monahan, Bishop Fintan (2023). Chronicles of Faith: A Catholic Perspective on C.S. Lewis. Our Sunday Visitor. ISBN 978-1639661602.
