= Diocese of Killaloe =

Diocese in Ireland

The Diocese of Killaloe (/ˌkɪləˈluː/ kil-ə-LOO) may refer either to a Roman Catholic or a Church of Ireland (Anglican) diocese, in Ireland.

== Roman Catholic diocese ==
The Diocese of Killaloe is the second largest Roman Catholic diocese in Ireland.

It comprises the greater part of County Clare, a large portion of County Tipperary, and parts of Counties Offaly, Laois and Limerick, stretching from Birr Parish in the north to Toomevara Parish in the East and to Cross Parish on the Loop Head peninsula in the south-west of the diocese.

The Pro-Cathedral for the Catholic Diocese is in Ennis.

Killaloe is a suffragan diocese of Cashel.

Bishop Fintan Monahan is the current Bishop of Killaloe.

== Church of Ireland Diocese ==
In the Church of Ireland divisions, the diocese is now part of the Diocese of Tuam, Limerick and Killaloe. The pre-Reformation St. Flannan's Cathedral is the cathedral.

The present bishop is Michael Burrows.

== See also ==
- Bishop of Killaloe
- Bishop of Killaloe and Kilfenora
- Bishop of Killaloe and Clonfert
- Bishop of Limerick and Killaloe
