= Cornelius O'Dea =

Bishop in Ireland

Cornelius O'Dea (died 1569) was a bishop in Ireland during the first half of the sixteenth century.

He was nominated to be the Bishop of Killaloe by King Henry VIII on 30 May 1546; and was consecrated on 12 July 1546. He held the post until 1554.
