= Michael Harty (bishop) =

Former Irish Roman Catholic prelate

The Most Reverend Michael Harty D.D.
- Bishop of Killaloe
- Church: Roman Catholic
- Diocese: Killaloe
- Appointed: 28 September 1967
- Installed: 19 November 1967
- Term ended: 8 August 1994
- Predecessor: Joseph Rodgers
- Successor: William Walsh
- Previous posts: Secretary of the National Committee of Liturgical Consultors of the Irish Catholic Bishops' Conference; Editor of The Ordo and the Irish Catholic Directory; Senior Dean, Secretary to the President, Junior Dean and Lecturer at Saint Patrick's College, Maynooth; Teacher at Saint Flannan's College

Orders
- Ordination: 23 June 1946 by John Charles McQuaid
- Consecration: 19 November 1967 by William Conway

Personal details
- Born: 2 February 1922 Toomevara, County Tipperary, Ireland
- Died: 8 August 1994 (aged 72) Dublin, Ireland
- Buried: Cathedral of Saints Peter and Paul, Ennis, County Clare, Ireland
- Education: Saint Patrick’s College, Maynooth; University College Galway

Michael Anthony Harty (6 February 1922 – 8 August 1994) was an Irish Roman Catholic prelate who served as Bishop of Killaloe between 1967 and 1994.

== Early life ==
Harty was born in Lismore House, Toomevara, County Tipperary, on 6 February 1922, one of seven children to Patrick Harty, a farmer, and his wife Eileen (née Cleary). He attended primary school in Ballinree National School between 1928 and 1934, where he was known to be a very prominent scholar, and secondary school as a boarder in St Flannan's College between 1934 and 1939, where he won scholarships on the results of his Intermediate and Leaving Certificate examinations.

Harty entered St Patrick's College, Maynooth in 1939, obtaining Bachelor of Arts degrees in English, Languages and Literature in September 1942, and Theology in 1945. He was ordained to the priesthood in the College Chapel, Maynooth, County Kildare on 23 June 1946.

== Presbyteral ministry ==
Following his ordination, Harty undertook postgraduate studies at St Patrick's College, obtaining a Licentiate of Canon Law in June 1948 and later a Doctorate in Divinity. He also obtained a higher diploma in education from University College, Galway.

Harty returned to St Flannan's College as a teacher in September 1948, where he taught English and history, filling the vacancy in staff left by the appointment of Joseph Rodgers as coadjutor bishop of Killaloe the previous January. His return to St Flannan's College was brief, however, as he was appointed junior dean of St Patrick's College in October 1949, while also lecturing in liturgy.

Harty was granted a year's leave of absence in September 1953, to gain pastoral experience working as an assistant in a parish in Los Angeles. While in the United States, he travelled widely to study pedagogical systems in seminaries.

On his return to Ireland, Harty served as secretary to the President of St Patrick's College between 1955 and 1959. He was also appointed dean of St. Joseph's Division in St Patrick's College in October 1957, as well as editor of the Ordo and the Irish Catholic Directory.

Harty was appointed senior dean of St Patrick's College in October 1960, and Supervisor of University Examinations in the National University of Ireland, Maynooth, between 1960 and 1963. He returned to the United States in summer 1964 as locum in a parish in Los Angeles and to attend the national Liturgical Conference in St. Louis.

On returning to Ireland, Harty was appointed secretary of the National Committee of Liturgical Consultors set up by the Irish Catholic Bishops' Conference in February 1965. Because of his keen interest in liturgical renewal, he served on the organising committee of the Glenstal Liturgical Congress, to which he lectured on a number of occasions.

Harty later served as chairman of the Liturgy Commission, editing a number of books: The People's Mass Book and The People's Book for Holy Week and Easter, both commissioned in 1966 to give effect to the new liturgical changes ensuing from the Second Vatican Council, as well as The New Irish Supplement for the Missal and Breviary and The Lectionary for Week-days. He was also a founding subscriber and regular contributor to The Furrow, as well as the Irish Ecclesiastical Record, Christus Rex and Doctrine and Life.

== Episcopal ministry ==
Following the sudden death of Joseph Rodgers on 10 July 1966, Harty was appointed Bishop of Killaloe on 28 September 1967. He was consecrated by the Archbishop of Armagh, William Conway, on 19 November in the Pro-Cathedral of Saints Peter and Paul, Ennis.

Harty's episcopacy witnessed the extension of parish boundaries and the construction of ten new churches and over twenty new schools. His concern for his people was marked by his insistence that priests in the diocese be trained in community development and social work. Harty was also deeply concerned about social marginalisation and the difficulties faced by the poor in obtaining credit, an issue for which he advocated while serving on the Irish Catholic Bishops' Conference Commission for Finance.

A prominent member of the Rural Housing Association, a group founded to maintain rural population, his main concern was with the problem of emigration. He was also an outspoken critic of successive governments’ attitudes to the emigrants' plight throughout his episcopate, regularly sending priests of the diocese to minister to the Irish abroad.

Known for walking the streets of Ennis to learn the concerns of his people, Harty advocated a practical church, placing a greater emphasis on community projects such as pre-marriage courses and marriage counselling. He was also actively involved in world development programmes and a past chairman of the Irish Commission for Justice and Peace.

Recognising the need for a body to co-ordinate the activities of voluntary organisations in County Clare, particularly those in the provision and development of local services for the elderly, at a time when there were relatively few social services in Ireland, Harty called a meeting to consider the formation of a Social Service Council in the county. The inaugural meeting of the Clare Social Service Council, now known as Clarecare, took place in Ennis on 12 November 1968.

Following a series of renovations – including a significant re-ordering of the building in 1973 to make it suitable for the new liturgical changes ensuing from the Second Vatican Council – and 100 years after it was first declared a pro-cathedral, Harty solemnly dedicated Ennis Cathedral as the cathedral church of the Roman Catholic Diocese of Killaloe on 18 November 1990.

== Death ==
Harty died suddenly at his sister's home in Dublin on 8 August 1994, having attended the All-Ireland Senior Hurling Championship semi-finals in Croke Park the previous day, as he had a lifelong interest in Gaelic games. After Cahal Daly, he was the longest-serving member of the Catholic hierarchy in Ireland at his death.

He was buried in the grounds of the Cathedral of Saints Peter and Paul in Ennis.

His alma mater, Ballinree National School, was renamed in his honour.

== Bibliography ==
- Harty, Rev. Michael, ed. (1966). The People's Book for Holy Week and Easter – Special Edition for Ireland. London-Dublin: Geoffrey Chapman. ASIN B00257NUQM.
- Harty, Rev. Michael, ed. (1966). The People's Mass Book – Edition for Ireland. London-Dublin: Geoffrey Chapman. ASIN B007X5WHQK.

Catholic Church titles
Preceded by Joseph Rodgers	Bishop of Killaloe; 1967–1994	Succeeded by Willie Walsh
