= Principal teacher =

A principal teacher (PT) is a promoted post within Scottish state schools who is a member of the school's middle leadership team. The position is not the same as a school principal in other countries; principal teachers usually report to a deputy head teacher within larger schools, or directly to the head teacher in smaller schools. Principal teachers may be appointed in primary schools, secondary schools, additional support for learning schools, and at local authority level. A principal teacher may or may not have a teaching commitment, though all principal teachers are fully registered teachers with the General Teaching Council for Scotland.

== Principal teachers in secondary schools ==
In secondary schools, principal teachers include the heads of departments or faculties within the school. In addition to these "curricular" principal teachers, secondary schools may also have principal teachers of pupil support/ pastoral care and support for learning. In some secondary schools and local authorities, principal teacher posts involve specific whole management responsibilities, such as principal teachers of raising attainment, digital technologies, literacy (whole school), numeracy (whole school), STEM, etc.

== Principal teachers in primary schools ==
In primary schools, a principal teacher may have management responsibilities for specific curricular areas (such as literacy or numeracy), pastoral care, support for learning, or development of school initiatives and policies.

== Faculty heads in secondary schools ==
Many local authorities have been following a policy of reducing the number of principal teachers in secondary schools by combining departments and having principal teachers titled 'curriculum leaders' or 'faculty heads'. Faculty heads lead a number of subject areas, which in the past would have been led by separate principal teachers. Common examples of this include faculty heads of science who lead biology, chemistry and physics departments within the school. Historically, these subject areas would have had their own principal teachers.

Scottish teachings unions have expressed concern that the replacement of groups of departmental principal teachers with fewer faculty principal teachers is being driven by the desire to cut costs, rather than about improving the management of secondary schools.

== Pay scale ==
All principal teachers in Scotland are placed on the appropriate point on the principal teachers salary scale, as set out by the Scottish Negotiating Committee for Teachers. Principal teachers are paid on an 8-point scale depending on a job-sizing process which takes into consideration the management responsibilities associated with the post. The salary scale points on which principal teachers are placed is between £55,155 and £71,181 as of August 1 2024.

== Example organisation ==
State schools in Scotland will have a staffing complement proportionate to the school roll, and decided by the local authority. This includes the determination of the structure of senior leadership within schools. Most state schools in Scotland have one head teacher and a number of depute head teachers. Head teachers and local authorities will identify the number of principal teachers an individual school may appoint. In secondary schools, this will include principal teachers of pupil support/ pastoral care (guidance), and a number of curricular principal teachers, and others with whole-school responsibilities as decided by the head teacher.

== See also ==
- Education in Scotland
