= Thomas McRedmond =

Roman-catholic bishop

- Bishop of Killaloe
- Church: Catholic Church
- Diocese: Diocese of Killaloe
- In office: 19 June 1891 – 5 April 1904
- Predecessor: Michael Flannery
- Successor: Michael Fogarty
- Previous posts: Titular Bishop of Verinopolis (1889-1891); Coadjutor Bishop of Killaloe (1889-1891)

Orders
- Ordination: 1860
- Consecration: 12 January 1890 by Thomas Croke

Personal details
- Born: 1 July 1838 Parsonstown, County Offaly, United Kingdom of Great Britain and Ireland
- Died: 5 April 1904 (aged 65) Blarney, County Cork, United Kingdom of Great Britain and Ireland

Thomas McRedmond (1 July 1838, Birr, County Offaly – 5 April 1904, Blarney, County Cork) was an Irish Roman Catholic bishop.

McRedmond was educated at St Patrick's College, Maynooth and ordained in 1860. He appointed bishop’s chaplain and curate of Nenagh in 1861. He became the first President of the Diocesan College (St Flannan's College), Ennis in 1866; and parish priest of Killaloe and vicar-general in 1876. He was appointed coadjutor bishop of Killaloe in September 1889; and consecrated on 12 January 1890. He succeeded as diocesan on 19 June 1891, and held the post until his death in 1904. He received the degree of Doctor of Divinity (DD).

Catholic Church titles
Preceded by Michael Flannery	Bishop of Killaloe; 1891–1904	Succeeded by Michael Fogarty
