= Roman Catholic Diocese of Killaloe =

Catholic diocese in Ireland

Coordinates: 52°50′55.73″N 8°59′22.71″W

Diocese of Killaloe Dioecesis Laoniensis Deoise Chill Dalua

Catholic
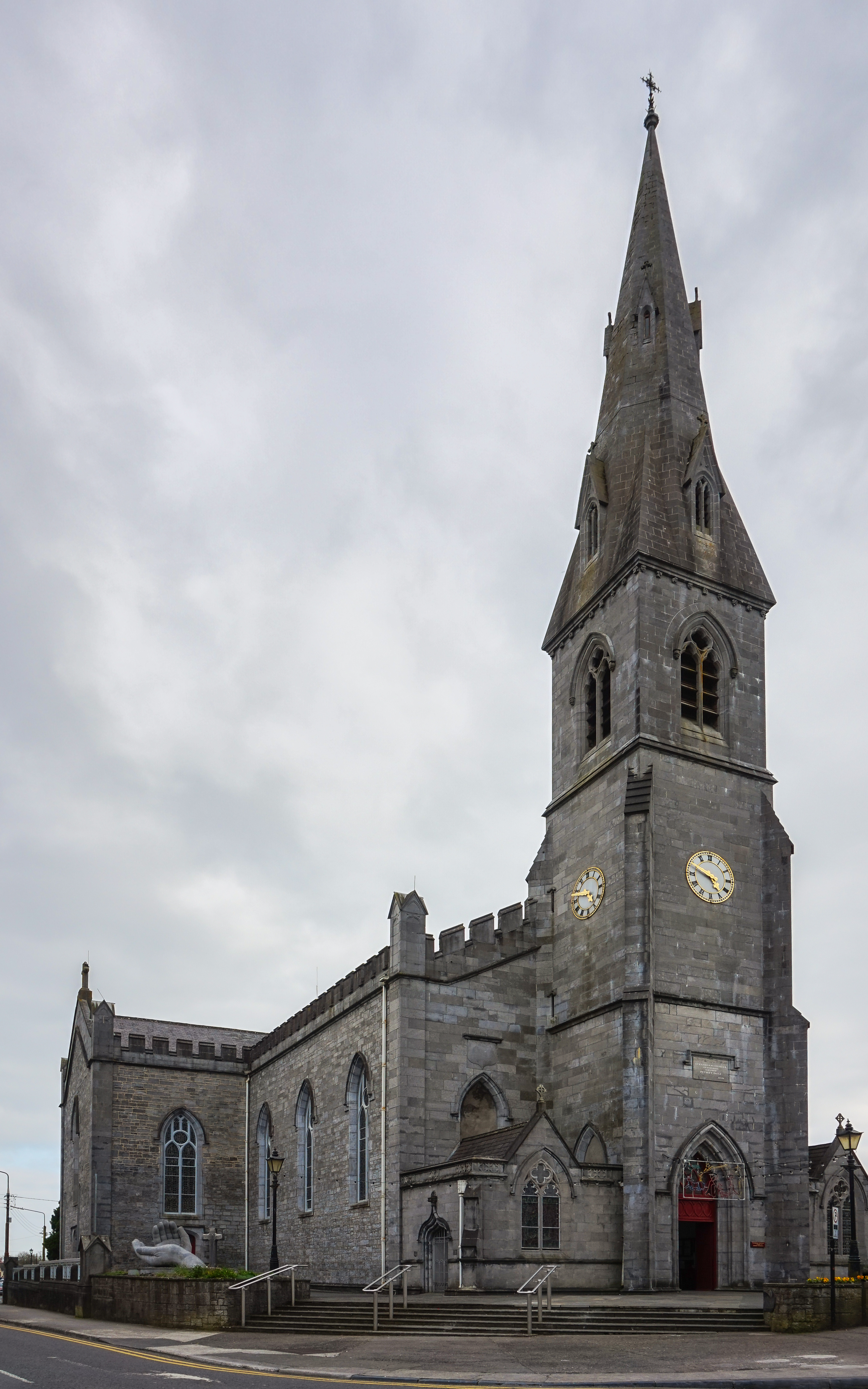
- Cathedral of Ss Peter and Paul, Ennis.

Location
- Country: Ireland
- Territory: Parts of counties Clare, Laois, Limerick, Offaly and Tipperary
- Ecclesiastical province: Cashel and Emly
- Metropolitan: Cashel and Emly

Statistics
- Area: 1,747 sq mi (4,520 km^{2})
- Population: Total; Catholics: (as of 2016); 129,436; 119,313 (92.2%)
- Parishes: 58

Information
- Denomination: Catholic
- Sui iuris church: Latin Church
- Rite: Roman Rite
- Established: 1111
- Cathedral: Ss Peter and Paul, Ennis
- Patron saint: Flannan
- Secular priests: 70 (as of 2020)

Current leadership
- Pope: Leo XIV
- Bishop: Fintan Monahan, Bishop of Killaloe
- Metropolitan Archbishop: Kieran O'Reilly, Archbishop of Cashel and Emly
- Vicar General: Fr. Desmond Hillery

Map
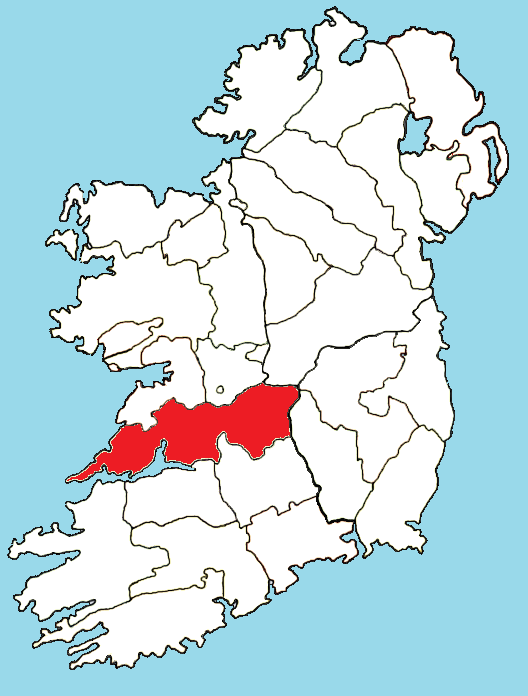

Website
- killaloediocese.ie

The Diocese of Killaloe (/ˌkɪləˈluː/ kil-ə-LOO; Irish: Deoise Chill Dalua) is a Latin diocese of the Catholic Church in mid-western Ireland, one of six suffragan dioceses in the ecclesiastical province of Cashel and Emly.

The cathedral church of the diocese is the Cathedral of Ss Peter and Paul in Ennis, County Clare.

The incumbent bishop of the diocese is Fintan Monahan.

== Geography ==
The diocese is divided into 58 parishes, which are spread across five counties: 38 in Clare, thirteen in Tipperary, five in Offaly, one in Limerick, and one group parish in Laois.

The parishes are grouped into 15 Pastoral Areas, where groups of priests are appointed to cover a number of parishes between them.

As of 2018, there were 90 priests in the diocese: 52 under and 38 over the mandatory retirement age of 75. However, by 2020, this had decreased to 70: 36 under and 34 over 70.

Aside from the cathedral town of Ennis, the main towns in the diocese are Birr, Kilrush, Nenagh, Roscrea and Shannon.

Pastoral Area	Parishes or Group Parishes
Cois Fharraige	Cross (Kilballyowen); Carrigaholt; Kilkee (Kilfearagh); Doonbeg (Killard)
Inis Cathaigh	Kilrush; Killimer; Cooraclare (Kilmacduane); Kilmihil
Radharc na n-Oileán	Kilmurry McMahon-Labasheeda; Coolmeen-Cranny (Kilfidane); Kildysart; Ballynacally-Lissycasey (Clondegad)
Críocha Callan	Mullagh (Kilmurry-Ibrickane); Milltown Malbay (Kilfarboy); Inagh and Kilnamona; Kilmaley and Inch
Abbey	Ennis; Doora-Barefield (Doora and Kilraightis); Quin and Clooney; Clarecastle-Ballyea (Clare Abbey)
Tradaree	Newmarket-on-Fergus; Shannon; Sixmilebridge
Ceantar na Lochanna	Tulla; O'Callaghan's Mills-Kilkishen; Broadford
Imeall Bóirne	Tubber (Kilkeedy); Corofin (Kilnaboy and Rath); Ruan and Dysart; Crusheen (Inchicronan)
Inis Cealtra	Killanena and Flagmount; Feakle; Scariff and Moynoe; Mountshannon (Clonrush) and Whitegate; Bodyke (Kilnoe and Tuamgraney); Ogonnelloe
Scáth na Sionnaine	Killaloe; Clonlara (Doonas and Truagh); Castleconnell and Ahane
Odhrán	Portroe (Castletown Arrha); Youghalarra (Burgess and Youghal); Puckane (Cloghprior and Monsea); Nenagh; Silvermines; Templederry (Kilenaive)
Ollatrim	Cloughjordan; Dunkerrin; Toomevara
Cois Deirige	Terryglass and Kilbarron; Borrisokane; Lorrha and Dorrha
Brendan	Birr; Shinrone; Kilcolman; Kinnitty
Crónán	Roscrea; Bournea (Couraganeen); Kyle and Knock

== Ordinaries ==
The following lists the ten most recent bishops:

- Patrick Kennedy (1836–1851)
- Daniel Vaughan (1851–1859)
- Michael Flannery (1859–1891)
- Thomas McRedmond (1891–1904)
- Michael Fogarty (1904–1955)
- Joseph Rodgers (1955–1966)
- Michael Harty (1967–1994)
- Willie Walsh (1994–2010)
- Kieran O'Reilly (2010–2015)
- Fintan Monahan (2016–present)

== See also ==
- Catholic Church in Ireland
- Church of Ireland Diocese of Limerick and Killaloe
- Middle Third
- Thomond
