= Ennis Cathedral =

Coordinates: 52°50′30″N 8°59′00″W

- Cathedral of Ss Peter and Paul
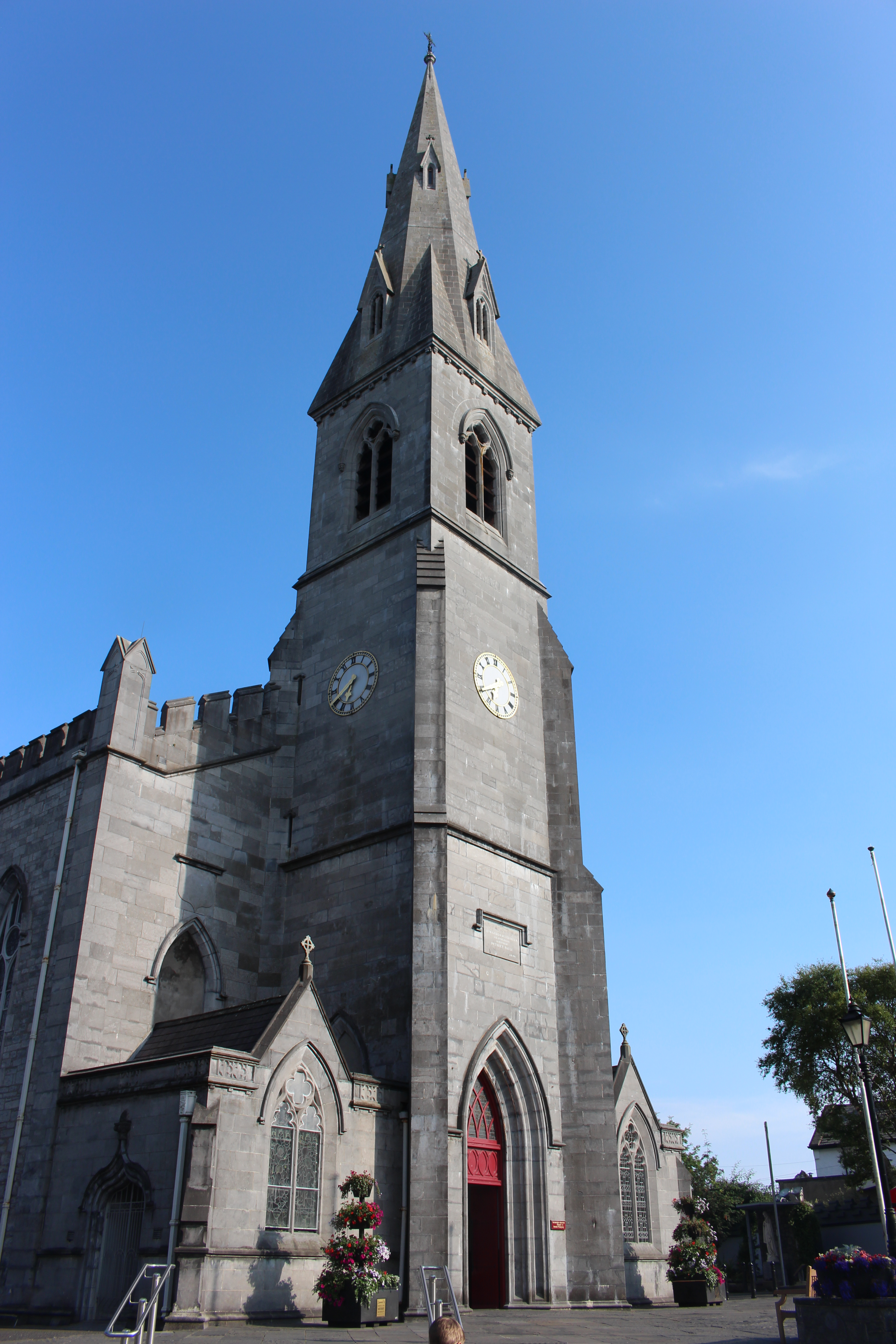

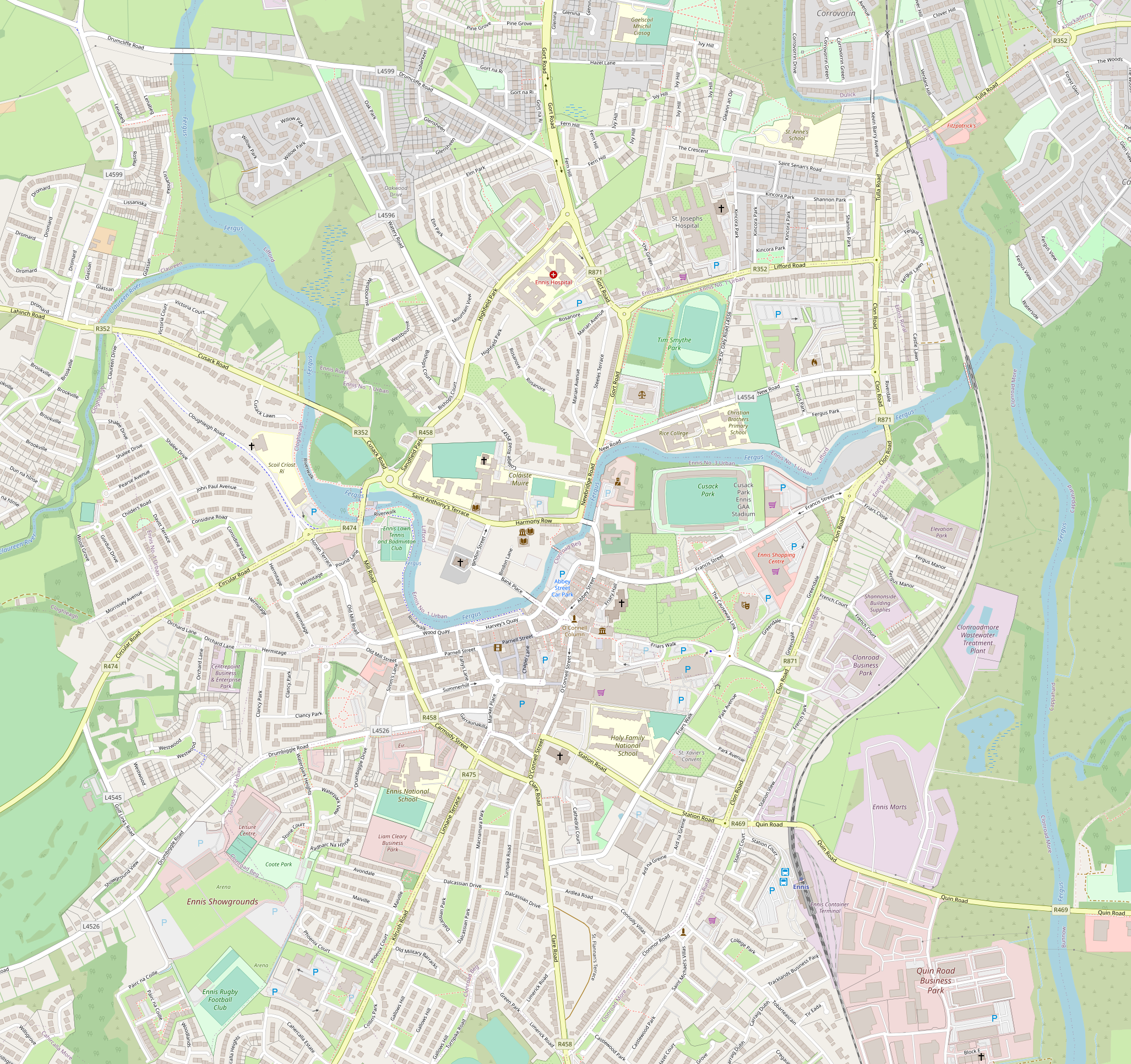
- Location within Ennis Location within Ireland
- Location: Ennis, County Clare
- Country: Ireland
- Denomination: Roman Catholic
- Tradition: Christian
- Website: www.ennisparish.com

History
- Status: Cathedral (also parish church)
- Dedicated: 26 February 1843 by Bishop Patrick Kennedy

Architecture
- Functional status: Active
- Architect(s): Maurice Fitzgerald; JJ McCarthy (interior decorations); Andrew Devane (altar)
- Years built: 1830s 1970s (renovation)

Specifications
- Materials: Stone

Administration
- Archdiocese: Cashel and Emly
- Diocese: Killaloe

Clergy
- Bishop: Fintan Monahan
- Dean: Canon Tom Ryan
- Priest: Fr Martin Blake

The Cathedral of Saints Peter and Paul (also known as Ennis Cathedral), is the cathedral church of the Roman Catholic Diocese of Killaloe. It is located in Ennis, County Clare, Ireland.

== History ==
The site of the cathedral was donated to the diocese in 1828 for the construction of a parish church for Ennis. Building works were commenced and continued with slow progress, and the unfinished church was first used to hold Mass in 1842. The church was then dedicated to saints Peter and Paul a year later.

Development of the church largely stopped during the Great Famine, but afterwards works to the interior design of the church were undertaken. The tower and spire of the church were completed in 1874. The parish church was elevated to pro-cathedral status in 1889, with the Bishop taking residence in Ennis.

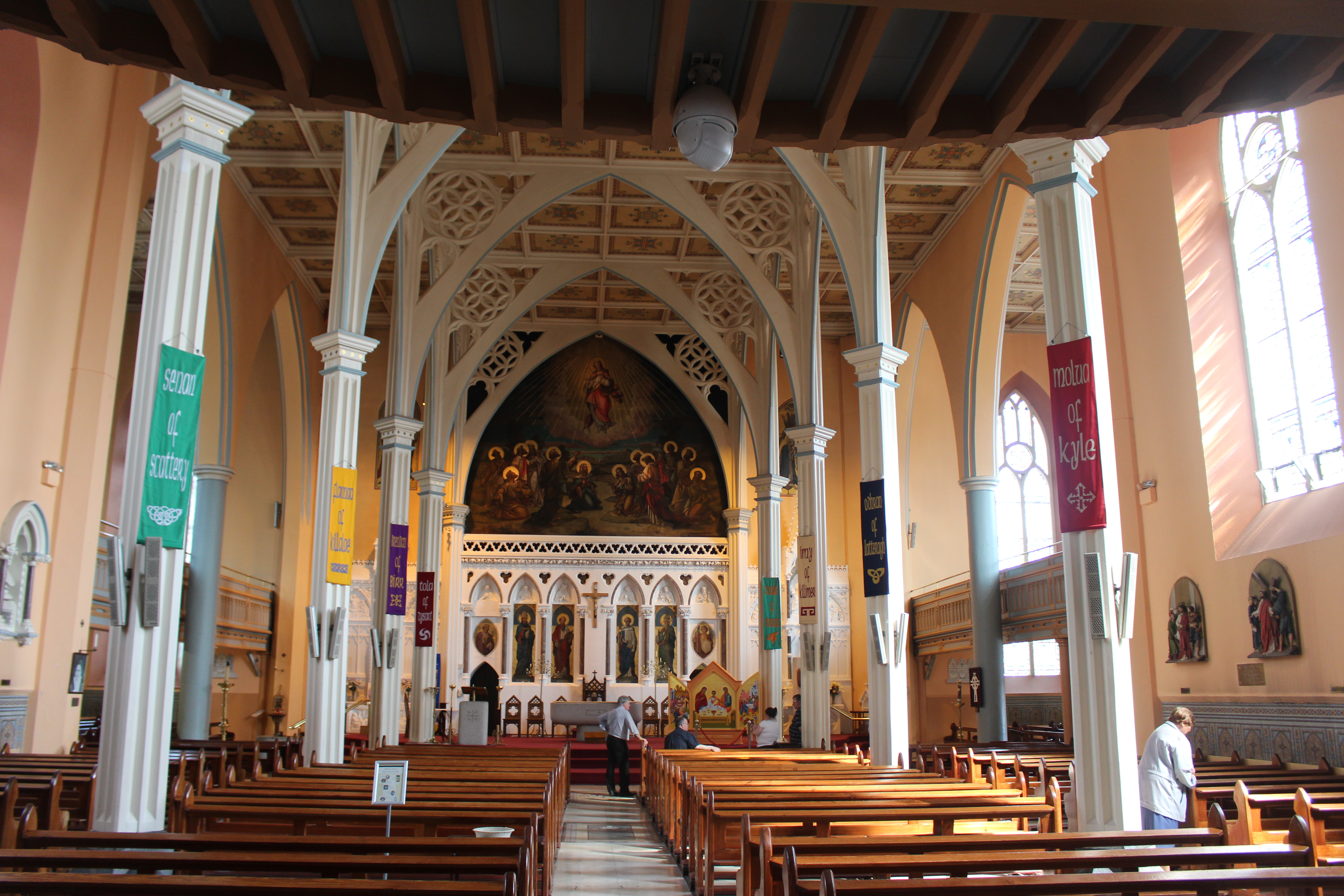
Interior of the cathedral in 2018

In 1890, Thomas J. McRedmond became the Bishop of Killaloe, and decided to base the bishopric at the church in Ennis. Thus, the parish church was designated as the pro-cathedral of the Diocese of Killaloe.

In 1894, the main entrance of the cathedral was constructed, and extensive redecoration of the building was undertaken. In the 1930s, a new sacristy and chapter room were added to the building, and the present pipe organ and chapter stalls were installed.

The cathedral was closed for six months in 1973, while work was undertaken to remodel the building to the requirements of the Second Vatican Council. The pipe organ was refurbished in 1985.

The pro-cathedral was rededicated as a cathedral in 1990. After a fire in the cathedral in 1995, the sanctuary was rebuilt and the interiors were redecorated, with works completed at the end of 1996.
