= Glynn (surname) =

Glynn is a surname. Notable people with the surname include:

- Alan Glynn (born 1960), Irish writer
- Bill Glynn (entrepreneur), American entrepreneur
- Carlin Glynn (1940–2023), American actress
- Christopher Glynn (born 1974), British classical pianist and festival director
- Connie Glynn (born 1994), English YouTuber and author
- Dominic Glynn (born 1960), British composer
- Eleanor Glynn (born 1986), British model
- Erica Glynn (born 1964), Australian filmmaker, daughter of Freda Glynn
- Eugene David Glynn (1926–2007), American psychoanalyst, writer, art critic and partner of writer and illustrator Maurice Sendak for 50 years
- Freda Glynn (born 1939), Australian photographer, mother of Erica Glynn
- Holly Glynn (1966–1987), American suicide victim
- Ian Glynn (1928–2022), British biologist
- Jeanne Glynn (1932–2007), television screenwriter
- John Joseph Glynn (1926–2004), American bishop
- Joseph Glynn (engineer) (1799–1863), British steam engine designer
- Martin Glynn (criminologist) (born 1957), British poet, theatre director and cultural activist
- Martin Glynn (priest) (1729–1794), last Rector of the Irish College in Bordeaux
- Martin Glynn (Rector) (died 1794), last Rector of the Irish College of Bordeaux
- Mary Ann Glynn, American academic
- Paul Glynn (1928–2022), Australian priest
- Pauline McLynn (born 1962), actress, comedian and author
- Phin Glynn, British film and television producer and writer
- Rona Glynn (1936–1965), first Aboriginal Australian teacher in Alice Springs, sister of Freda Glynn
- Ronan Glynn, Irish public health physician and physiotherapist who rose to prominence during the COVID-19 pandemic
- Ruairi Glynn (born 1981), installation artist
- Thomas Robinson Glynn (1841–1931), British physician
- Tom Glynn-Carney (born 1995 as Tom Glynn-Whitehead), English actor
- Tony Glynn (1926–1994), Australian missionary in Japan
- Victor Glynn (born 1956), British film and television producer and writer
- William Burns Glynn (1923–2014), British engineer and researcher of the Pre-Columbian era in Peru

== Fictional characters ==
- Ben Glynn, police officer investigating the death of Joe McIntyre in Coronation Street
- Warden Leo Glynn, the warden of the Oswald state correctional facility in the HBO drama Oz

== Military ==
- Clive Glynn (1893–1946), British soldier
- Henry Richard Glynn (1768–1856), British admiral
- James Glynn (1800–1871), U.S. Navy officer
- James F. Glynn, U.S. Marine officer

== Politicians ==
- Alexander Glynn Campbell (1796–1836), Isle of Wight politician
- Brendan Glynn (1910–1986), Fine Gael Teachta Dála
- Camillus Glynn (born 1941), Irish politician
- George Glynn Petre (1822–1905), British diplomat
- James P. Glynn (1867–1930), U.S. congressman from Connecticut
- John Glynn (1722–1779), English lawyer and Member of Parliament
- Joseph Glynn (politician), (1869–1943), politician, knight and historian
- Josh Fenton-Glynn, British politician
- Martin H. Glynn (1871–1924), American politician
- Paddy Glynn (1855–1931), Irish-Australian Attorney General
- Ronnie Glynn, American politician
- Theodore A. Glynn (1881–1950), American politician
- Thomas Glynn (died 1648), Welsh politician
- Thomas Glynn Walker (1899–1993), American attorney and judge

== Sportsmen ==
- Ben Glynn (born 1991), British rugby union player
- Bill Glynn (baseball) (1925–2013), baseball player
- Bill Glynn (footballer) (1900–1978), Australian rules footballer
- Brian Glynn (born 1967), German-born Canadian hockey player
- Brian Glynn (cricketer) (1940–2007), English cricketer
- Dessie Glynn (1928–2017), Republic of Ireland international footballer
- Gene Glynn (born 1956), American baseball player and coach
- Jack Glynn (born 2000), Irish Gaelic footballer
- Johnny Glynn (c. 1917–1959), President of the Irish Rugby Football Union
- Jonathan Glynn (born 1993), Irish hurler
- Leighton Glynn (born 1982), Irish hurler and Gaelic footballer
- Martin Glynn (bobsleigh) (born 1951), Canadian Olympian
- Peter Glynn (1952–2024), English rugby league player
- Ryan Glynn (born 1974), American baseball player
- Steve Glynn, American college football coach
- Steven Glynn (born 1988), Canadian sports analyst known as Steve Dangle
- Terry Glynn (born 1958), English footballer
- William Glynn (cricketer) (1846–1895), Australian cricketer

== See also ==
- Glyn (surname)
- Flann Mac Flainn, Archbishop of Tuam (1250–56)
- Nicol Mac Flainn, Archbishop-elect of Tuam, fl. 1283
- Pádraig Mag Fhloinn, also known as Pat Glynn, scribe, fl. 1828–1835
- Seán Mag Fhloinn, scribe, fl. 1843–1915
