= William Glynn =

William or Bill Glynn may refer to:

- William Glyn (bishop) (1504–1558), bishop of Bangor
- William Glynn (cricketer) (1846–1895), Australian cricketer
- William Burns Glynn (1923–2014), British engineer and researcher of the pre-Columbian era in Peru
- Bill Glynn (footballer) (1900–1978), Australian rules footballer
- Bill Glynn (baseball) (1925–2013), Major League Baseball first baseman
- Bill Glynn (entrepreneur) (born 1968), American entrepreneur
