= Klaxon (disambiguation) =

A klaxon is a type of an electromechanical horn or alerting device, originally a brand name.

Klaxon(s) or The Klaxon(s) may also refer to:

== Music ==
- The Klaxon, a 1993 album by English rock band And Also the Trees
- Klaxon (EP), an EP by Immi
- "The Klaxon", a 1930 song composed by Henry Fillmore
- Klaxons, an English indie rock band
- The Klaxons (Belgian band), a Belgian accordion-based band
- "Klaxon", a song by K-pop girl group (G)I-dle from their 7th EP I Sway

== Publications ==
- The Klaxon (magazine), a defunct Irish literary magazine from 1923 to 1924
- Klaxon (magazine), a Brazilian literary magazine
- The Klaxon (website), an Australian independent news website
- The Klaxon.com, an online news organization focused on emergencies and disasters around the world

== Other uses ==
- Klaxon Oil Corporation, a fictional company in the 1979 thriller novel Nothing Lasts Forever
