= The Klaxon (magazine) =

Irish literary magazine

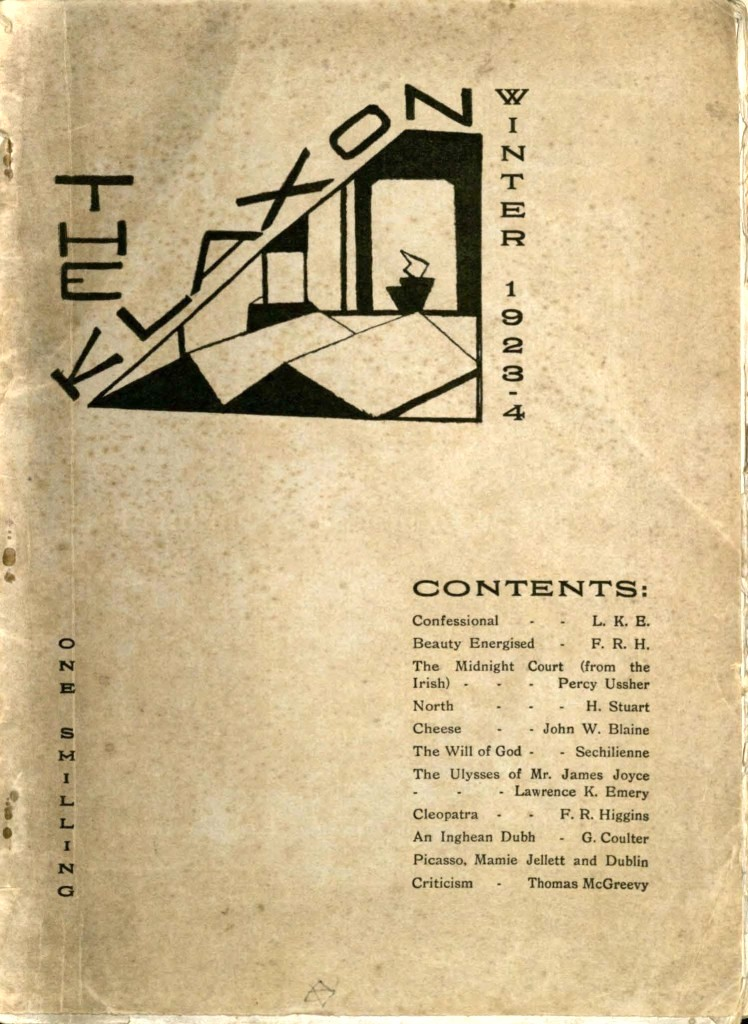
Front cover of the only issue of The Klaxon (Winter 1923/1924)

The Klaxon: An Irish International Quarterly was an avant-garde literary magazine of literature, art, and criticism published in Dublin. The magazine ran for a single issue between 1923-1924. It was created and edited by A.J. "Con" Leventhal. Leventhal decided to start the magazine after his review of Ulysses was rejected by Seumas O'Sullivan's The Dublin Magazine on account of the printers' refusal to publish a positive review of James Joyce. Among its contributors were Thomas MacGreevy, Francis Stuart, F.R. Higgins, and Cecil Ffrench Salkeld.

The Klaxon is noteworthy for being the first magazine to publish a critically appreciative review of Ulysses in the Irish Free State. It also included an installment of Arland Ussher's English translation of Brian Merriman's The Midnight Court, the first translation of the poem to be published in the 20th century. The original poetry and criticism published in The Klaxon show an engagement with European modernist movements like imagism, cubism, Dadaism, and surrealism, as well as an interest in Japanese and African art. After failing to secure funding for a second issue, Leventhal and other Klaxon contributors went on to start another avant-garde periodical called To-Morrow, which was published for two issues (August 1924 and September 1924).

== Reception ==
At the time of its publication, The Klaxon was described as "an excellent ambition" by the pro-treaty Freeman's Journal and "unconventional" by the Irish Independent, which compared the magazine to Ford Madox Ford's transatlantic review. George Russell, writing for the Irish Statesman, described the venture as "Irish youth [...] trying desperately to be wild and wicked without the capacity to be anything else but young".

Contemporary scholars have described The Klaxon as "Ireland's first [...] fiercely Modernist magazine." Its design and content are consistent with other periodicals published during the interwar high modernist period, especially little magazines like The Little Review, BLAST, and 391. Like many modernist magazines, The Klaxon featured a manifesto, written by Leventhal, which was aimed at provoking the public: "We railed against the psychopedantic parlours of our elders and their maidenly consorts, hoping the while with an excess of Picabia and banter, a whiff of Dadaist Europe to kick Ireland into artistic wakefulness."

== Content ==
The only issue of The Klaxon, published in Winter 1923/4, included:

- "Confessional," by Lawrence K. Emery (pseudonym of A.J. "Con" Leventhal)
- "Beauty Energised," by F.R. Higgins
- "The Midnight Court," by Brian Merriman (trans. Arland Ussher)
- "North," by Francis Stuart
- "Cheese," by John W. Blaine
- "The Will of God," by "Sechilienne"
- "The Ulysses of Mr. James Joyce," by Lawrence K. Emery (pseudonym of A.J. "Con" Leventhal)
- "Cleopatra," by F.R. Higgins
- "An Inghean Dubh," by G. Coulter
- "Picasso, Mamie Jellett, and Dublin Criticism" (sic), by Thomas MacGreevy
