= Ethna MacCarthy =

- Born: 2 April 1903; Coleraine, County Londonderry
- Died: 24 May 1959 (aged 56); East Ham Memorial Hospital, London
- Known for: poetry
- Relatives: Denis Florence MacCarthy (grandfather), Mary Stanislaus MacCarthy (aunt)

Ethna MacCarthy (2 April 1903 – 24 May 1959) was an Irish poet and paediatrician.

== Early life and education ==
MacCarthy was born in Coleraine, County Londonderry. on 2 April 1903 to Brendan MacCarthy, a doctor and a medical inspector in the Local Government Board, and Eleanor McCarthy (née Dexter). Her paternal grandfather was the poet Denis Florence MacCarthy. She had two brothers Denis Florence and Desmond, and a sister. The family moved to Dublin in the 1900s, when her father took up a position at the headquarters of the Local Government Board in the Custom House. They lived at "Desmond", Sandymount Ave., Ballsbridge. It is likely that MacCarthy attended the local convent school where her aunt, Mary Stanislaus MacCarthy, lived as part of the Dominican Convent, Blackrock. MacCarthy enrolled in a secretarial college, going on to the Royal Academy of Music, and then entering Trinity College Dublin (TCD) in 1922 as a foundation scholar. There she studied French and Spanish, attaining a BA in 1926 and an MA in 1937.

== Career ==
MacCarthy became a lecturer in French and Provençal in TCD. She was remembered by a contemporary as having "beauty and wit threw a vivid light over the front square of Trinity College and over the lectures which were the only function at which, until quite recently, the male and female undergraduates were permitted to forgather. Her presence illumined those occasions." She was also described as a feminist before the coining of the phrase. She had many admirers due to her outgoing nature, including Denis Johnston and Samuel Beckett. MacCarthy appears in Beckett's Dream of fair to middling women as "the Alba", and is said to have been the inspiration for the girl in the punt in Krapp's last tape. MacCarthy is reputed to have been Beckett's first love. Johnston wrote the poem To Ethna for her. She began a long-term relationship with Con Leventhal, with the couple marrying in 1956 after the death of his wife.

In the mid-1930s MacCarthy entered the TCD school of physic, graduating in 1941 with a Bachelor of Medicine, Bachelor of Surgery followed by an MD in 1946. By this time she was interested in paediatrics, taking the position of the physician to the children's dispensary at the Royal City of Dublin Hospital. She left this post in 1954, and was intending on joining the World Health Organization, but failed the obligatory physical examination. She made a few contributions to the Irish Journal of Medical Science on topics relating to public health problems.

== Poetry ==
Much like her grandfather and aunt, MacCarthy was a poet in her own right. Verses such as The invitation, Lullaby and Clinic were published in The Dublin Magazine along with her translations from German and Spanish. In 1937, Ireland Today published her short story Flight. Her one-act play, The uninvited, was published in The Dublin Magazine in 1951. MacCarthy was deemed to be "a good minor poet", and was included in a number of anthologies, including the 1948 New Irish poets by Devin-Adair Publishing Company.

== Death and legacy ==
MacCarthy died on 24 May 1959 at the East Ham Memorial Hospital, London, having suffered from throat cancer for a year. Over her final year, Beckett corresponded with her regularly. He sent her violets picked near this home in Ussy with the note: "This is just my heart to you and my hand in yours and a few wood violets I'd take from their haunt for no one else." Beckett's letters to her are held in the University of Texas at Austin. The TCD collection of Denis Johnston papers include a number of her letter. Professor Eoin O'Brien owns a drawing of her by Seán O'Sullivan. Material by MacCarthy is also held within the TCD Con Leventhal collection.
