= Liam Ó hOisín =

Irish scribe and translator (fl. 1825–1871)

Liam Ó hOisín (fl. 1825–1871) was an Irish scribe and translator.

== Biography ==
Ó hOisín was a native of Cummer, County Galway and a prolific scribe active in the middle years of the 19th century. During his lifetime he recorded poems (including selections by Antoine Ó Raifteirí and the brothers Marcus and Peatsaí Ó Callanáin); Fenian lore and sagas from Irish mythology; and verse in both Irish and English. One of his books was obtained by a later scribe, Seán Mag Fhloinn (1843–1915) who stated that "I got his old book full of charms ('owree' he calls them), poems, recipts and curiosities of all kinds in phonetic Irish and in English, from my friend Mr. Glynn of Tuam."

== See also ==
- Éamann Ó hOrchaidh
