= Éamann Ó hOrchaidh =

Irish scribe and translator

Éamann Ó hOrchaidh (fl. 1817) was an Irish scribe and translator.

== Biography ==
Little is known of Ó hOrchaidh. To date, the only item of his work is a copy of Cúirt an Mheán Oíche ('the Midnight Court') by the Co. Clare poet, Brian Merriman, composed about 1780. The manuscript containing it is held in Dublin at the library of the Royal Irish Academy, but up to 2018 there was no record of it containing a version of the poem. Its value lies in the fact that it is written in the badly-attested Connacht Irish of County Roscommon rather than the Munster Irish of County Clare. Both dialects are now extinct, with Ó hOrchaidh's manuscript one of the last featuring Connacht orthography and vocabulary and how Irish was pronounced in east Co. Galway and south Co. Roscommon (see Uí Maine), rendering its value quite high.

Ó hOrchaidh's version was discovered in 2018 by dialectologist and sociolinguist Professor Brian Ó Curnáin of the Dublin Institute for Advanced Studies. Ó hOrchaidh wrote it in 1817 in An Bhearaidh Bheag (Barry Beg) townland, Kiltoom parish, west of Lough Ree and Athlone. With translation, his scribal note at the end of the text reads:

Crioch le Cúirt an Meón áoighthe liomsa. Édhmonn Ó hórróchodh air an Marráighbheag a nguirr do bhaille athalúin. agus air na chríochneamh an threas lá don Mhaolluis aois an tíagharna náomhtha Dia na glódhaire May 3rd 1817./The end of The Midnight Court by me Éamann Ó hOrchaidh in Barry Beg near Athlone. And finished on the third day of May in the year of the Holy Lord, God of Glory, May 3rd 1817.

The surname is now rendered O'Hora, or Hore.

== See also ==
- Liam Ó hOisín
- Tadhg Ó Neachtain
- Pádraig Mag Fhloinn
- Liam Ó Dúgáin
- Jim O'Hora
