= Lough Graney =

Lake in County Clare, Ireland

- Loch Gréine (Irish)
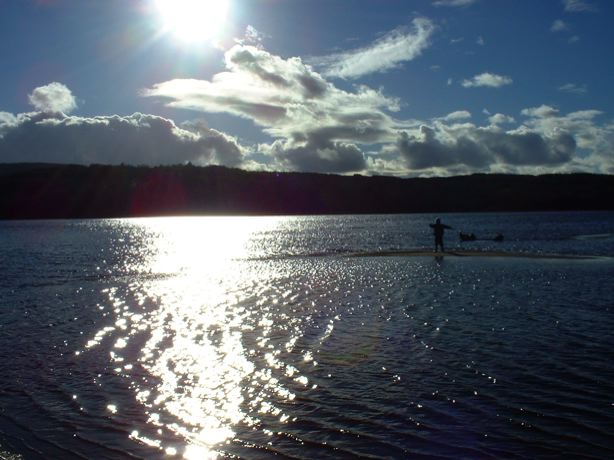

- Location within Ireland
- Location: County Clare, Ireland
- Coordinates: 52.983121°N 8.663227°W
- Primary outflows: River Graney
- Catchment area: River Shannon
- Basin countries: Ireland
- Surface area: 3.7 km^{2} (1.4 sq mi)
- Surface elevation: 49 m (161 ft)
- Islands: Green Island, Sand Island

Lough Graney (Irish: Loch Gréine) is a lake in County Clare, Ireland. The lake's outlet is the short River Graney, which flows through Lough O'Grady and past the town of Scarriff into the west side of Lough Derg.

== Recreation ==
Lough Graney is a site for fishing perch, ferox trout, roach and bream.

== In popular culture ==
The Lough has a place in the history of Irish literature. In 1780, local poet and hedge school master Brian Merriman set the beginning of his mock-Aisling poem Cúirt An Mheán Oíche ("The Midnight Court") along the shores of Lough Graney. A stone, which has been carved with the opening lines of the poem in Munster Irish, stands overlooking the site.

== See also ==
- List of loughs in Ireland
