= Mary Stanislaus MacCarthy =

Irish poet

Sister Mary Stanislaus MacCarthy (1849–1897) was an Irish poet, educator and nun. MacCarthy was a daughter of poet Denis Florence MacCarthy, who wrote as "Desmond of The Nation" and Elizabeth MacCarthy (née Donnelly).

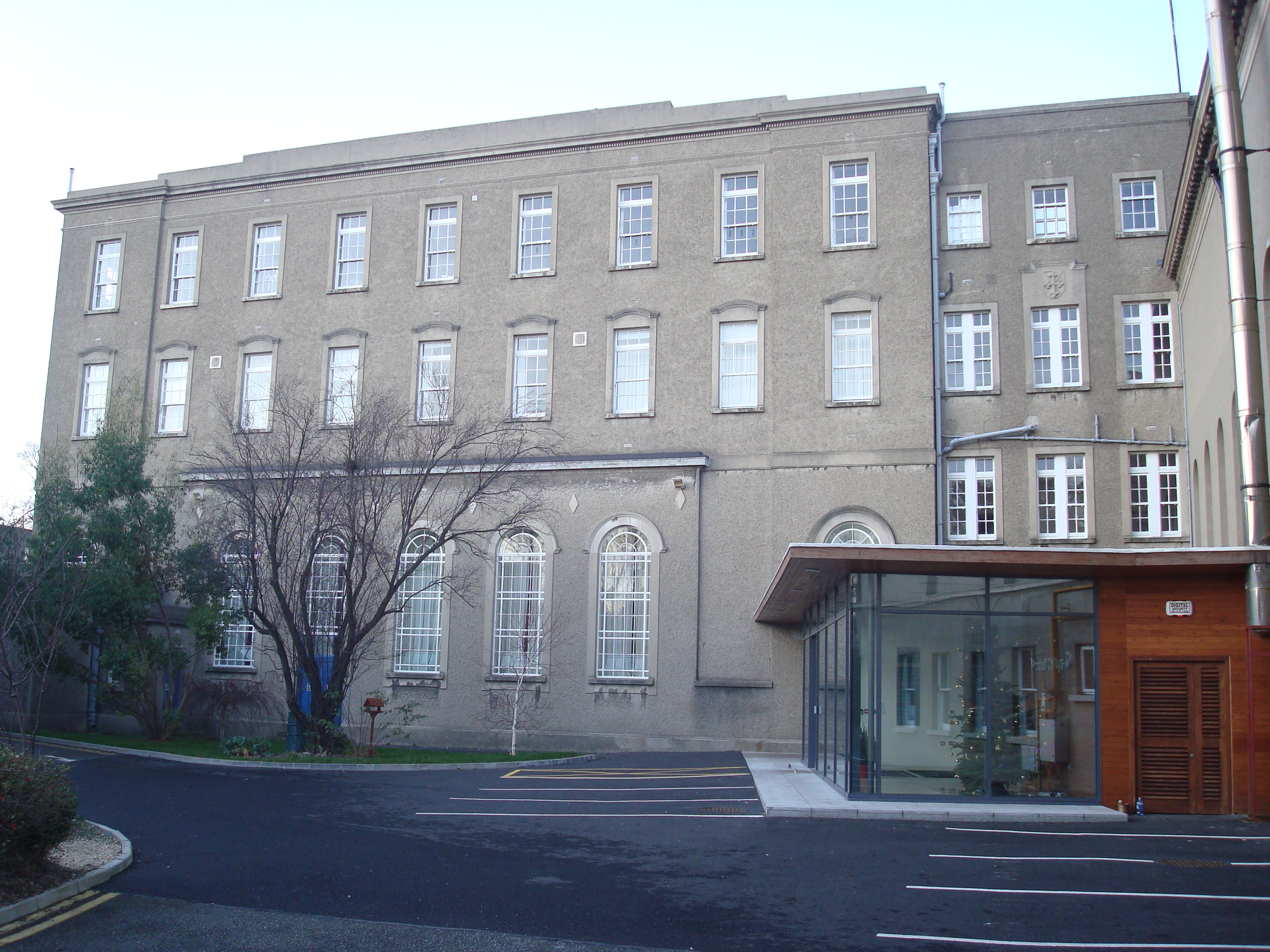
Sion Hill School Original

== Biography ==
Mary MacCarthy was born on 26 December 1849 in Blackrock, County Dublin and was the eldest of nine children. As a child she became a student of St. Catherine's Dominican Convent, Sion Hill, Blackrock, aged 10. She became a novice of the convent on the 18 December 1867, later joining the community in 1869, completing her vows and becoming Sister Mary Stanislaus of the Order of St. Dominick on 14 June 1870. Becoming an English literature teacher, she continued to practice and educate at St Catherine's until she was taken ill with typhoid fever in the summer of 1897, dying on the grounds of St Catherine's on 11 August 1897, aged 47, after having served as a nun for 29 years and 10 months.

== Family and early years ==
In her infancy her father dedicated poetry to her, notably a sentimental piece ‘A valentine: to my daughter “Murillo”, fourteen months old’ on 14 February, which appeared in the Dublin University Magazine in March 1851. At age four, Mary's 13 month old brother, Willie, died on 30 November 1854. Her early years were spent at the family home in Summerfield, Dalkey, County Dublin.

She showed her poetic talent as a young girl when she wrote an unpublished manuscript of sonnets titled 'Extracts and Translations etc.', which contained sonnets about her family members, particularly her brother Florence and historical figure Napoleon Bonaparte. Napoleon was later mentioned in her published work Assumption of the Blessed Virgin.

She admired other figures, including; George Gordon, Lord Byron, Percy Bysshe Shelley, Henry Wadsworth Longfellow, Alfred Tennyson and Cardinal John Henry Newman.

Beginning with the death of Mary's sister, Lillie, on 30 September 1873, the MacCarthy family experienced a great period of sadness. Lillie was just 13. Less than one year later, her sister Josephine died on 19 March 1874, aged 18. Mary's mother, Elizabeth MacCarthy, died just five months later on 22 August 1874, aged 53.

Mary's poem 'A Birthday Book of the Dead' was dedicated to the death of her brother, Florence, who died on 12 December 1886, as well as her sister, Ethna, who died on 16 December 1885.

She was related to a number of other writers including her father Denis, her niece Ethna MacCarthy, and three consecutive generations of MacCarthy poets during her lifetime alone.

== Life's work ==
=== Poetry ===
MacCarthy began writing religious poetry as a young woman and is believed to have had her first work published in the first edition of the Irish Monthly, December 1873. The editor was Matthew Russell. Her association with the magazine continued until June 1895, where her work appeared under the publishing pseudonym S.M.S. She contributed to other Catholic journals, most notably the Rosary. Among MacCarthy's works, she is credited for editing 'Birthday Book of the Dead', containing a poetic extract that was from her father's 'ode on the death of a young Earl in Belfast', its prose written by Father Joeseph Farrell. She is also more widely credited for her published work 'Song's of Sion', which contains a brief sketch of her life and several memorial poems, two of which are written by her father. In all, the Irish Monthly published twenty of her poems between 1873 and 1895. After her death, they published a further two poems anonymously, one in 1898 and another in 1903.

=== Nun and teacher ===
After assisting in preparing a new foundation in Tyrawley House, 19 Eccles St., Dublin, with Mother Antonina Hanley (December 1882–January 1883), she returned to Sion Hill.

In September 1886, she began teaching in the convent's new university department which prepared female students for RUI examinations, the first degree for women in Ireland considered to be on par with their male counterparts. Dominican nuns of Sion Hill, such as MacCarthy, were noted as having challenged accepted gender roles in Irish education, contributing to curriculum reform and encouraging girls to register for public examinations. Due to personal belief or cultural climate, it was not deemed appropriate by the Dominican nuns to campaign publicly for women's educational rights, but MacCarthy and her peers felt comfortable pushing for curriculum reform and acceptance of competitive examinations for girls. Among her earliest undergraduate students was Katherine Murphy (later Hogan), who took first place in Ireland in the BA examinations for 1890. MacCarthy was elected sub-prioress of Sion Hill in 1889 and 1892.

In September 1893 she joined the new community at St Mary's, Merrion Square, Dublin, where she continued her teachings in the English department. She was later appointed sub-prioress of St Mary's community, August 1896.

== Death and legacy ==
McCarthy's funeral was celebrated by clergymen and friends in the convent chapel of Sion Hill proceeding her absolution on 13 August 1897. The chapel was adorned with drapery, her remains enclosed in an oaken coffin. Her grave was covered with wreaths sent by friends and pupils. In memory of MacCarthy's death, Reverend Matthew Russell submitted a poem to The Irish Monthly entitled "When one within thy convent home would die".

== Published works ==
- A Rebukes for mourning the death of a dear child "Ah, cruel Reaper of the Flowers!", 1873.
- My Three: "Oh lovely blossoms of a fruitful tree", 1875.
- A Eucharistic Thought: "How do we treat the Prisoner of our shrine", 1875.
- The homeless one: "The long bright eastern day is done", 1876.
- St. John, the evangelist: "O John, thy Master's dearest earthly friend", 1877.
- Make sure of prayer: "Art thou still young and dost thou glance along", 1877.
- The dead: "How many gaily sing and lightly smile", 1878.
- Lyra Hibernica Sacra, Belfast, 1878.
- A convent elegy: "The young birds trill their sweetest tune", 1880.
- St. Augustine and St. Monica at Ostia: "See the rich glory of the setting sun", 1881.
- On Cardinal Newman's 80th Birthday: "Thus would I have him to remain" was said, 1881.
- Her first anniversary: "In days and weeks that somehow passed", 1883.
- In Memoriam Sister Mary Rose, O.S.D. (Emily Dillon Brady): "Eternal rest and endless light", 1884.
- The island of saints and scholars: "The Irish land, the Irish land", 1885.
- A Saint Among Sinners: Sketch of the Life of St. Emmelia, Mother of St. Basil the Great, Dublin, 1885.
- A Birthday Book of the Dead, Dublin, 1886.
- O Thou who has made me, have mercy on me: "There are times, bitter times, full of doubt and despair", 1886.
- A shamrock of sonnets beginning "Sweet sister, playmate of my earlier years", 1892.
- Domine ut videam!: "Apart into a desert place", 1893.
- Pilgrimages: "I often think when pious pilgrims tell", 1893.
- Three roundels: "We little know when friends are gay", 1895.
- United still by prayer: "The first place vacant in our home below", 1898.
- Songs of Sion, Dublin, 1898.
- Life of Blessed Emily Bicchieri, O.S.D., Dublin, 1902.
- Mother and Child: "The little Infant Jesus, how beautiful is He" 1903.
