= Aisling =

Irish poetic genre

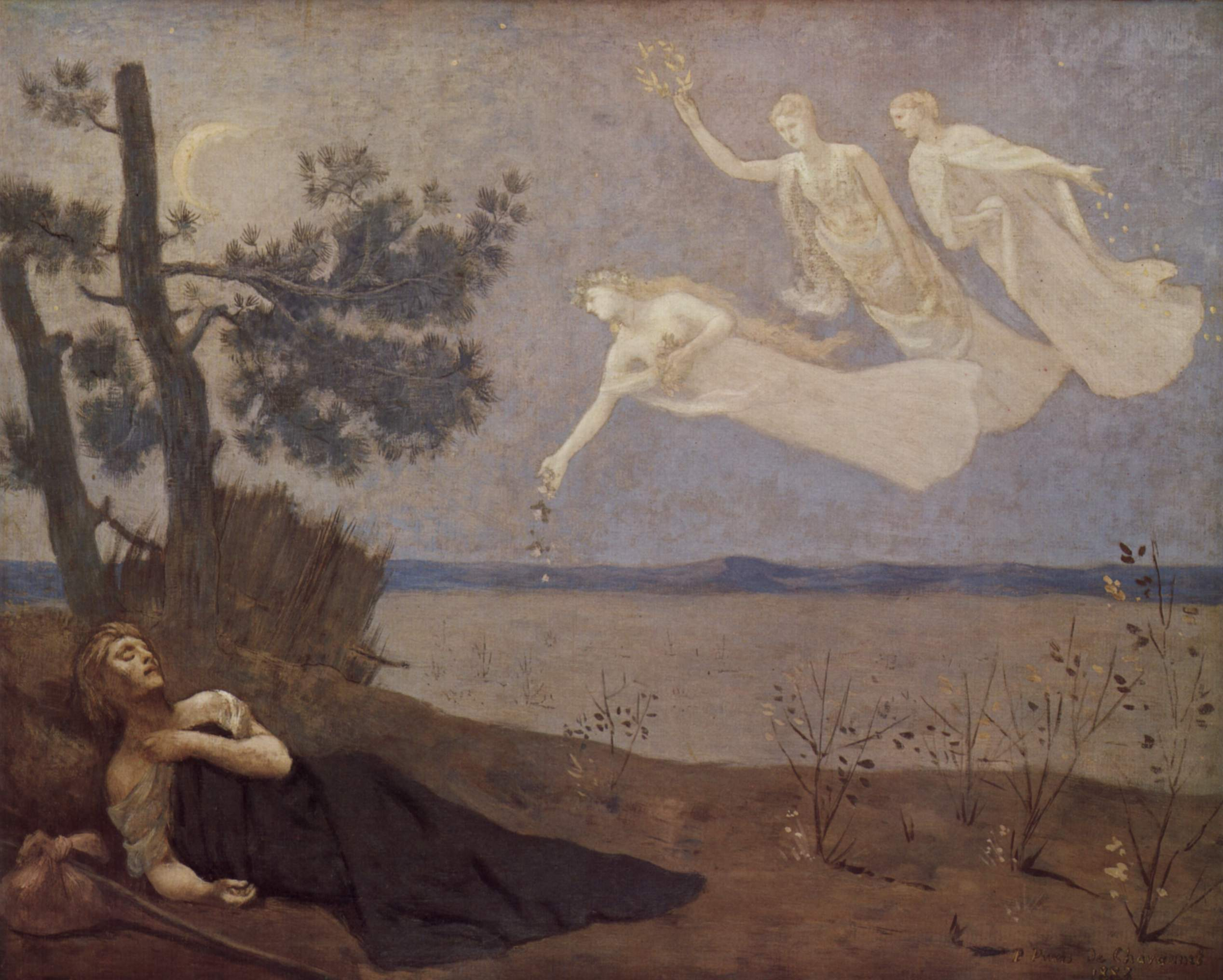
Pierre-Cécile Puvis de Chavannes: An Aisling, 1883

The aisling (Irish for 'dream' / 'vision', pronounced [ˈaʃl̠ʲəɲ], approximately /ˈæʃlɪŋ/ ASH-ling), or vision poem, is a mythopoeic poetic genre that developed during the late 17th and 18th centuries in Irish language poetry. The word may have a number of variations in pronunciation, but the is of the first syllable is always realised as a [ʃ] ("sh") sound.

Many aisling poems are often still sung as traditional sean-nós songs.

== History of the form ==
In the aisling, Ireland appears to the poet in a vision in the form of a woman from the Otherworld: sometimes young and beautiful, other times old and haggard. This female figure is generally referred to in the poems as a spéirbhean (pronounced [ˈsˠpʲeːɾʲvʲanˠ], 'heavenly woman'). She laments the current state of the Irish people and predicts an imminent revival of their fortunes, usually linked to the restoration of the Roman Catholic House of Stuart to the thrones of Great Britain and Ireland.

The form developed out of an earlier, non-political genre akin to the French reverdie, in which the poet meets a beautiful, supernatural woman who symbolizes the spring season, the bounty of nature, and love. Another source was a tradition rooted in Irish mythology in which a god or goddess of the Tuatha Dé Danann, the pre-Christian pantheon, is seen weeping for the recent death of a local hero.

According to Daniel Corkery, the first aisling poems in the Irish language were composed during the early 17th century by the Roman Catholic priest, historian, and poet Geoffrey Keating. Keating's poem Mo bhrón mo cheótuirse cléibh is croidhe ("My sorrow, my gloomy weariness of breast and heart") and his elegy for the 1626 death of John Fitzgerald are both Aislingí. In the latter poem, Keating awakens from a slumber that has overtaken him along the banks of the River Slaney and is confronted by a vision of the pre-Christian Irish goddess Cliodhna weeping for the death of John Fitzgerald.

In Corca Dhuibhne in 1653, an anonymous bard composed a lament over the recent death by hanging of Irish clan chief, poet, and folk hero Piaras Feiritéar at Cnocán na gCaorach in Killarney, for leading his clansmen in war against the Cromwellian conquest of Ireland. The lament begins, Do chonnac aisling are maidin an lar ghil ("I saw a vision on the morning of the bright day"). The vision was the goddess Erin bewailing the death of a man who had overthrown hundreds.

The first of the aisling poets was Aodhagán Ó Rathaille, athair na haislinge ('father of the aisling'). In the hands of Ó Rathaille, the aisling tradition was bound up for the first time with the cause of the House of Stuart and of the Jacobite risings. It was Ó Rathaille who, for the first time, made the woman from the Otherworld lament the continued exile of the Stuart heir.

According to Daniel Corkery, "The Aisling proper is Jacobite poetry; and a typical example would run something like this: The poet, weak with thinking of the woe that has overtaken the Gael, falls into a deep slumber. In his dreaming a figure of radiant beauty draws near. She is so bright, so stately, the poet imagines her one of the immortals. Is she Deirdre? Is she Gearnait? Or is she Helen? Or Venus? He questions her, and learns that she is Erin; and her sorrow, he is told, is for her true mate who is in exile beyond the seas. This true mate is, according to the date of the composition, either the Old or Young Pretender; and the poem ends with a promise of speedy redemption on the return of the King's son."

Among the most famous examples of aisling poetry are Gile na gile by Ó Rathaille and Ceo draíochta i gcoim oíche by Eoghan Rua Ó Súilleabháin, who is also famed for his works in the genre.

The wildly popular sean-nós song "Mo Ghile Mear", which was composed by County Cork bard Seán "Clárach" Mac Domhnaill, is a lament for the defeat of the Jacobite rising of 1745 at the Battle of Culloden. The poem is a soliloquy by the Kingdom of Ireland, whom Seán Clárach personifies as the goddess Erin bewailing her state and describing herself as a grieving widow due to the defeat and exile of her lawful king. Since being popularised by Seán Ó Riada, "Mo Ghile Mear" has become one of the most popular Irish songs ever written. It has been recorded by The Chieftains, Mary Black, Muireann Nic Amhlaoibh, Sting, Sibéal, and many other artists.

In 1753, John Cameron (Scottish Gaelic: An Taillear Mac Alasdair) of Dochanassie in Lochaber, composed (Scottish Gaelic: Òran d'on Doctair Chamshròn) "A Song to Doctor Cameron", an Aisling poem in Scottish Gaelic lamenting the absence from the lands of Clan Cameron of Dr. Archibald Cameron of Lochiel, who had just become the last Jacobite to be executed for high treason at Tyburn.

Cathleen ni Houlihan was based on a figure from aisling poetry but adapted into a stage play by leading members of the Irish Literary Revival in 1902. Cathleen Ni Houlihan is an old and poor woman, a seemingly otherworldly figure that is the embodiment of Irish republicanism and can only be transformed back into a young woman if a young man gives his life for her sake. She also symbolically represents The Morrígan, the goddess of war and sovereignty, from Irish mythology.

In later years, like his fellow Irish-language poets Diarmuid na Bolgaí Ó Sé and Máire Bhuidhe Ní Laoghaire, Ballymacoda-born poet and Deerfield, New York homesteader Pádraig Phiarais Cúndún updated aisling poetry from Jacobitism to more recent religious and political causes of the Irish people. Cúndún's aisling poems helped inspire the more recent Irish-language poetry of Seán Gaelach Ó Súilleabháin, who adapted the aisling tradition to the experiences of the Irish diaspora, the events of the Easter Rising of 1916, and the Irish War of Independence.

In Scottish Gaelic literature, Allan MacDonald's eerily prophetic Aisling poem Ceum nam Mìltean ("The March of Thousands"), describes waking up after a nightmare and feeling a sense of foreboding and dread about thousands of men marching away, through the newly fallen snow, to a conflict they will never return from. Literary scholar Ronald Black wrote that Ceum nam Mìltean deserved to be "first in any anthology of the poetry of World War I" and "would not have been in any way out of place, with regard to style or substance" in Sorley MacLean's groundbreaking 1943 Symbolist poetry collection Dàin do Eimhir.

In modern poetry composed in the Irish language outside Ireland, a major figure remains. Seán Gaelach Ó Súilleabháin was a native of the now-abandoned island of Inishfarnard off the Beara Peninsula of County Cork. Ó Súilleabháin emigrated to the United States in 1905 and settled in the heavily Irish-American mining city of Butte, Montana, where he continued to both collect and compose Modern literature in Irish until his death in 1957.

In his pre-Easter Rising aisling poem Cois na Tuinne ("Beside the Wave"), Seán Gaelach describes pondering the woes of the Gael when he encounters the goddess Érin. Stunned, Seán Gaelach asks whether she is the heroine Medea from Greek mythology or perhaps the lover of 17th-century Irish clan chief Donal Cam O'Sullivan Beare. Although Érin laments her state, Seán Gaelach promises her that the Irish Volunteers will soon rise up and drive the English from the land. He predicts that the post-independence Irish economy will boom and bring everyone prosperity, the Irish language will be restored to the people, and that Ireland will be re-forested and filled with singing birds in all the branches of the trees.

In the 1917 aisling poem Bánta Mín Éirinn Glas Óg ("The Lush Green Plains of Ireland"), Seán Gaelach describes meeting Érin again, proposing marriage to her, and trying to convince her to emigrate with him overseas to tíribh an cheóil ("the land of music"). When Seán Gaelach promises never to abandon her, Érin finally agrees to marry him and join him in America.

Despite the end of the Irish War of Independence in 1922, interest in the aisling form and its use by poets continues.

Lady Hazel Lavery posed for portraits as the personification of a number of aisling figures from Irish history such as James Clarence Mangan's Dark Rosaleen and W.B. Yeats's Cathleen Ni Houlihan. The portraits were painted by her husband Sir John Lavery and appeared on bank notes in numerous forms over the course of the 20th century in Ireland as they were commissioned by the government of the Irish Free State.

During the semicentennial of the Easter Rising in 1966, the Garden of Remembrance, which is dedicated to the memory of "all those who gave their lives in the cause of Irish Freedom", was formally opened by Eamon de Valera. It is located in the northern fifth of the former Rotunda Gardens in Parnell Square, a Georgian square at the northern end of O'Connell Street where the paramilitary Irish Volunteers were founded in 1913.

In 1976, a contest was held to find a poem which could express the appreciation and inspiration of the generations that fought and died in the struggle for Irish independence. The winner of the contest was Dublin-born author Liam mac Uistín, whose poem An Aisling ("We Saw a Vision"), is now written in Irish, French and English upon the stone wall of the monument.

During Queen Elizabeth II's state visit to Ireland in May 2011, Liam mac Uistín's poem was read out in Irish during the Queen's visit to the Garden of Remembrance.

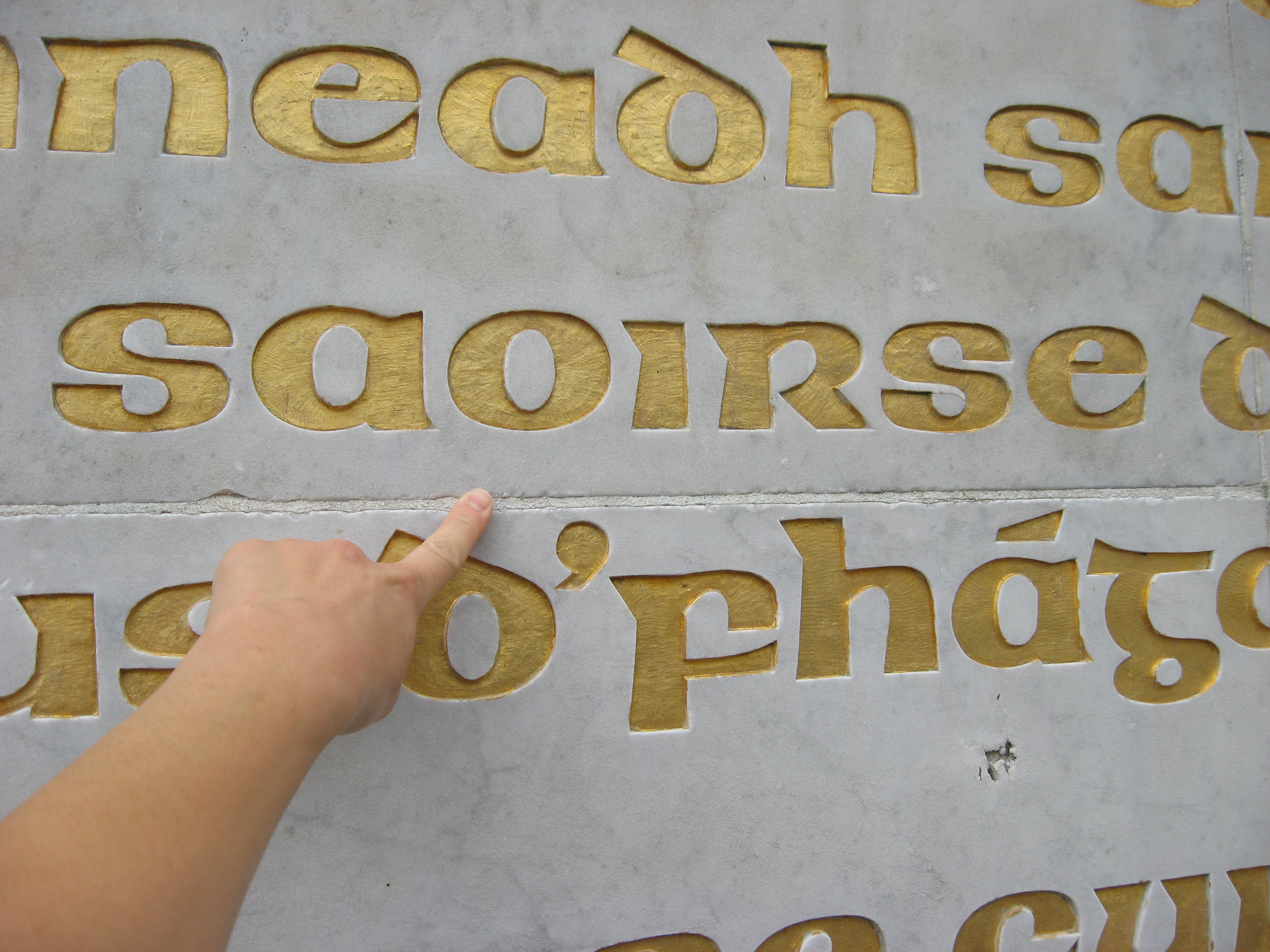
Saoirse (freedom in the Irish language) in the aisling in the Garden of Remembrance.

In Irish, the poem reads:

"An Aisling"

I ndorchacht an éadóchais rinneadh aisling dúinn.

Lasamar solas an dóchais agus níor múchadh é.

I bhfásach an lagmhisnigh rinneadh aisling dúinn.

Chuireamar crann na crógachta agus tháinig bláth air.

I ngeimhreadh na daoirse rinneadh aisling dúinn.

Mheileamar sneachta na táimhe agus rith abhainn na hathbheochana as.

Chuireamar ár n-aisling ag snámh mar eala ar an abhainn. Rinneadh fírinne den aisling.

Rinneadh samhradh den gheimhreadh. Rinneadh saoirse den daoirse agus d'fhágamar agaibhse mar oidhreacht í.

A ghlúnta na saoirse cuimhnígí orainne, glúnta na haislinge.

"We Saw A Vision"

In the darkness of despair we saw a vision,

We lit the light of hope and it was not extinguished.

In the desert of discouragement we saw a vision.

We planted the tree of valour and it blossomed.

In the winter of bondage we saw a vision.

We melted the snow of lethargy and the river of resurrection flowed from it.

We sent our vision aswim like a swan on the river. The vision became a reality.

Winter became summer. Bondage became freedom and this we left to you as your inheritance.

O generations of freedom remember us, the generations of the vision.

The Queen then laid a wreath at the Garden in honor of glúnta na haislinge ("the generations of the vision"), to whom Liam mac Uistín's poem both praises and gives a voice. The Queen's gesture was widely praised by the Irish media.

== Satire ==
In 1751, Jacobite war poet Alasdair MacMhaighstir Alasdair, whose poetry remains an immortal part of Scottish Gaelic literature, poked fun at the aisling genre in his anti-Whig and anti-Campbell satirical poem, An Airce ("The Ark"), which was published for the first time in Edinburgh as part of its author's groundbreaking poetry collection Ais-Eiridh na Sean Chánoin Albannaich ("The Resurrection of the Old Scottish Language"). Instead of a female deity, the Bard describes a meeting with the ghost of a member of Clan Campbell who was beheaded for Jacobitism. The ghost then prophesies that Clan Campbell will be punished for committing high treason against their lawful King during the Jacobite rising of 1745, first by a repeat of the Ten Plagues of Egypt and then by a second Great Flood upon Argyllshire. The Bard is instructed to emulate Noah and build an Ark for carefully selected Campbells. The moderates are to be welcomed aboard the Ark's decks after being purged of their Whiggery by first swallowing a heavy dose of seawater. Redcoats from the Campbell of Argyll Militia and a long list of Campbell tacksmen are to be tied with millstones and thrown overboard, or even much worse. Due to the militant Jacobitism of this poem and many others in the same book with it, all known copies of the collection were rounded up and publicly burned by the public hangman at Edinburgh in 1752.

In around 1780, County Clare poet and hedge school teacher Brian Merriman similarly parodied aisling poetry in his comic masterpiece Cúirt An Mheán Oíche ("The Midnight Court"). Instead of a pre-Christian goddess, Merriman describes being arrested by a hideous giant hag while dozing along the shores of Lough Graney. The hag then takes the Bard to the ruined church at Moynoe, where the women of Ireland are suing the men for their unwillingness to marry and father children. After self-justifying arguments by the morally bankrupt lawyers for both genders, the judge, the pre-Christian goddess Aoibheal, rules that all men except Roman Catholic priests must marry before the age of 20 on pain of flogging at the hands of Ireland's understandably angry and frustrated women. The poet is only saved from being the first single man to be flogged by waking up and realizing that his arrest and the trial were a nightmare.

In his poem Aisling an t-Saighdeir ("The Soldier's Dream"), Scottish Gaelic bard and World War I veteran Dòmhnall Ruadh Chorùna recalls seeing a full-grown red deer stag in the rush-covered glens of North Uist and how he scrambled over rocks and banks trying to get a clear shot at the animal. Dòmhnall slowly took aim and ignited the gunpowder with a spark, only to find that the stag was gone. He had been replaced by Dòmhnall's Captain shouting retreat, as the Imperial German Army had swept behind the Cameron Highlanders and were about to cut off all opportunity to escape. Dòmhnall recalled that he had awakened not a moment too soon and that he barely escaped "the net" before the Germans "pulled it together." Some members of his unit, however, were not so lucky and were taken away to POW camps in the German Empire.

In Paul Muldoon's 1983 satirical poem Aisling, which was written in response to the 1981 hunger strike campaign by Bobby Sands and other incarcerated members of the Provisional IRA, the goddess Erin was recast to symbolize Anorexia.

== Other uses ==
- LÉ Aisling (P23) is a ship that was in the Irish Naval Service from 1980 to 2016.
- "Aisling" is a poem by Seamus Heaney from the collection North (1975).
- The acclaimed Irish author Ciaran Carson has said that much of his literature is based around the idea of the aisling (dream vision).
- Aisling Ghéar by Breandán Ó Buachalla, a 20th-century aisling poet.
- Some believe the tune of "Danny Boy" is based on the ancient song of Aisling an Oigfear; the lyrics resemble the viewpoint of a message from a mother to her son for she had to leave him behind and become part of the Irish diaspora, serving as a metaphor for Ireland and the land they left behind them.

== In popular culture ==
- In the 2009 animated film The Secret of Kells, a main character is a girl of the Otherworld named Aisling with a cat called Pangur Bán.

== See also ==
- Aisling (name) – includes a list of people with this name
