= Immi =

immi イミー
- Born: 中澤真由 (Nakazawa Mayu); 26 January 1983 (age 43)
- Genres: Electronica, pop, electropop, techno, EDM, electro house
- Occupations: Singer, songwriter
- Years active: 2001–present
- Labels: Universal Music Japan (2001–2002); Grand Trax (2007–2009); DefStar Records (2009–present)
- Website: SoundCloud

Mayu Nakazawa (中澤真由 Nakazawa Mayu), known by the stage name immi, is a Japanese electronica singer and songwriter. She is signed onto DefStar Records. While she writes and composes her own music, she is also regularly produced by N.A.i.D. and JETBIKINI.

== Biography ==
Nakazawa has had experience with the arts since childhood. She learned to play piano at the age of five and took several art classes over the next seven years. After entering high school, she began to create her own music and perform live at various local venues. At the age of 16, she met producer Satoshi Kadokura through a family friend. He recommended that Nakazawa begin to pursue a music career in Tokyo. Shortly after graduating from university in 2001, Nakazawa signed onto Universal Music Japan using her real name, where she released four singles and one album over the course of one year. However, sales flopped and her material failed to chart on the Oricon rankings. Nakazawa then stopped releasing further material with Universal Music as she was dismissed from the label.

In 2007, she adopted the stage name immi and made several releases with the label Grand Trax (a division of her management agency Grand Funk), along with digital distribution by iTunes, Napster, and Mora. Her first single, "Cosmic Pink", was released on 28 November 2007 on iTunes Japan and was downloaded over 50,000 times in one week. The song "Local Train" was used in a commercial for Canon. Her second single, "Klaxon", was released on 12 March 2008, and contained a cover of "Lovesong" by The Cure. On 6 August 2008, she released her first album Switch on iTunes, and a physical CD edition was released on 10 September 2008.

In the summer of 2009, she signed to DefStar Records and released her first EP with the label, Wonder EP, on 22 July 2009. Her second EP, Alice EP, was released on 14 October 2009.

Immi's fourth overall single and first maxi single after signing onto DefStar Records, "Sign of Love," was released on 19 May 2010. The title track is the opening theme for the noitaminA anime House of Five Leaves. On 27 May 2010, Immi's official website announced the release of her first major studio-length album, Spiral, to be released on 16 June 2010. The album includes the title tracks from Wonder EP, Alice EP, and "Sign of Love."

She is now part of Tacomimi, DJ unit formed by her and longtime collaborator Jetbikini. As of 2021, she composes as part of D i AN, a collaboration between her, producer A-Bee and vocalist Seidenba Saku.

== Discography ==
=== Studio albums ===
as Mayu Nakazawa

- Step into My Heart (27 November 2002)

as immi

- Switch (6 August 2008)
- Spiral (16 June 2010)

==== Remix albums ====
as immi

- RimmiX (25 March 2009)

=== Extended plays ===
as Mayu Nakazawa

- Jellyfish EP (1 January 2006)

as immi

- Wonder EP (22 July 2009)
- Alice EP (14 October 2009)
- Two Faced EP (20 November 2015)

=== Singles ===
as Mayu Nakazawa

- "Hoka no Daredemo Nai Anata Wa" (28 November 2001)
- "Changes" (27 February 2002)
- "I wanna let you know ~Ai no Michijun~" (10 July 2002)
- "Funky Flushin'/Not One of Us" (6 November 2002)

as immi

- "Cosmic Pink" (28 November 2007)
- "Klaxon" (12 March 2008)
- "RimmiX (HMV Limited)" (7 January 2009)
- "Sign of Love" (19 May 2010)

=== Collaborations ===
The PBJ (feat. immi) (2 songs)

- "Luminosity Abundance" (7 October 2015)
