= Aibell =

Goddess in Irish mythology

In Irish legend, Aibell (sometimes Aoibheall (modern Irish spelling)), also anglicised as Aeval or Eevill) was a Pre-Christian goddess from the Irish mythology of Munster and the guardian spirit of the Dál gCais, the Delbhna, and the Clan Ó Bríen. She was demoted in popular belief, following the Christianisation of Gaelic Ireland, from a goddess to the Fairy Queen ruling over the Celtic Otherworld of Thomond, or north Munster. The entrance to her kingdom was believed to be at Craig Liath, the grey rock, a hill overlooking the Shannon about two miles north of Killaloe. Aibell also had a lover (called Dubhlainn Ua Artigan) and a magic harp (of which it was said "[w]hoever heard its music did not live long afterwards"). In Irish folklore, she was turned into a white cat by her sister, Clíodhna and is alleged to have appeared in a dream on the night before the Battle of Clontarf to Brian Boru, High King of Ireland, and prophesied his imminent death and that whichever of his sons he saw first would succeed him. In Modern literature in Irish, Aibell appears in many immortal 18th century Aisling poems composed in Munster Irish. Aibell also serves as the main antagonist in the very famous long comic poem (Irish: Cúirt an Mheán Oíche, "The Midnight Court") by Brian Merriman, in which she is the presiding judge during an Otherworldly lawsuit, in which the women of Ireland are suing the men for refusing to marry and father children.

== Name ==
The name Aoibheall may come from Gaelic aoibh, meaning "beauty" (or aoibhinn "beautiful"). Alternatively, as a theonym it could be derived from Proto-Celtic *Oibel-ā, literally "burning fire", which may have been a byword for the notion of "ardour"; the Romano-British equivalent of this Proto-Celtic theonym is likely to have been *Oebla. A variant name for the character is Áebinn.

== Attestations ==
=== An Buachaill Caol Dubh ===
In Seán Ó Seanacháin's song An Buachaill Caol Dubh, Aoibheal appears to the "Dark Slender Boy" (representing alcohol addiction) and his friend the drinker. In the last verse, Seanacháin expands by saying that, when Aoibheal met the two of them walking the road, she promised the lad a hundred men if he would let go of the poet. The lad replied that he was steadfast and true and would not desert his friends until they died. Thus Seán acknowledges his addiction will never disappear.

=== Lady Gregory ===
AND Aoibhell, another woman of the Sidhe, made her dwelling-place in Craig Liath, and at the time of the battle of Cluantarbh she set her love on a young man of Munster, Dubhlaing ua Artigan, that had been sent away in disgrace by the King of Ireland. But before the battle he came back to join with Murchadh, the king's son, and to fight for the Gael. And Aoibhell came to stop him; and when he would not stop with her she put a Druid covering about him, that way no one could see him.

And he went where Murchadh was fighting, and he made a great attack on the enemies of Ireland, and struck them down on every side. And Murchadh looked around him, and he said: "It seems to me I hear the sound of the blows of Dubhlaing ua Artigan, but I do not see himself." Then Dubhlaing threw off the Druid covering that was about him, and he said: 'I will not keep this covering upon me when you cannot see me through it. And come now across the plain to where Aoibbell is," he said, "for she can give us news of the battle."

So they went where she was, and she bade them both to quit the battle, for they would lose their lives in it. But Murchadh said to her, "I will tell you a little true story," he said; "that fear for my own body will never make me change my face. And if we fall," he said, "the strangers will fall with us; and it is many a man will fall by my own hand, and the Gael will be sharing their strong places." "Stop with me, Dubhlaing," she said then, "and you will have two hundred years of happy life with myself." "I will not give up Murchadh," he said, "or my own good name, for silver or gold." And there was anger on Aoibhell when he said that, and she said: "Murchadh will fall, and you yourself will fall, and your proud blood will be on the plain tomorrow." And they went back into the battle, and got their death there.

And it was Aoibhell gave a golden harp to the son of Meardha the time he was getting his learning at the school of the Sidhe in Connacht and that he heard his father had got his death by the King of Lochlann. And whoever heard the playing of that harp would not live long after it. And Meardha's son went where the three sons of the King of Lochlann were, and played on his harp for them, and they died.

It was that harp Cuchulain heard the time his enemies were gathering against him at Muirthemne, and he knew by it that his life was near its end.

=== Cúirt An Mheán Oíche ===
Aoibheal also features prominently in the 18th-century comic poem Cúirt An Mheán Oíche by Brian Merriman. The poem begins by using the conventions of the Aisling, or vision poem, in which the poet is out walking when he has a vision of a woman from the other world. Typically, this woman is Ireland and the poem will lament her lot and/or call on her 'sons' to rebel against foreign tyranny. In Merriman's hands, the convention is made to take a satirical and deeply ironic twist.

In the opening section of the poem, a hideous female giant appears to the poet and drags him kicking and screaming to the court of Queen Aoibheal of the Fairies. On the way to the ruined monastery at Moinmoy, the messenger explains that the Queen, disgusted by the twin corruptions of Anglo-Irish landlords and English Law, has taken the dispensing of justice upon herself. There follows a traditional court case under the Brehon law form of a three-part debate.

In the first part, a young woman calls on Aoibheal declares her case against the young men of Ireland for their refusal to marry. She complains that, despite increasingly desperate attempts to capture a husband via intensive flirtation at hurling matches, wakes, and pattern days, the young men insist on ignoring her in favour of late marriages to much older women. The young woman further bewails the contempt with which she is treated by the married women of the village.

She is answered by an old man who first denounces the wanton promiscuity of young women in general, suggesting that the young woman who spoke before was conceived by a Tinker under a cart. He vividly describes the infidelity of his own young wife. He declares his humiliation at finding her already pregnant on their wedding night and the gossip which has surrounded the "premature" birth of "his" son ever since. He disgustedly attacks the dissolute lifestyles of young women in general. Then, however, he declares that there is nothing wrong with his illegitimate children and denounces marriage as "out of date." He demands that the Queen outlaw it altogether and replace it with a system of free love.

The young woman, however, is infuriated by the old' man's words and is barely restrained from physically attacking him. She mocks his impotent failure to fulfill his marital duties with his young wife, who was a homeless beggar who married him to avoid starvation. The young woman then argues that if his wife has taken a lover, she well deserves one. The young woman then calls for the abolition of priestly celibacy, alleging that priests would otherwise make wonderful husbands and fathers. In the meantime, however, she will keep trying to attract an older man in hopes that her unmarried humiliation will finally end.

Finally, in the judgement section Queen Aoibheal rules that all laymen must marry before the age of 21, on pain of corporal punishment at the hands of Ireland's women. She advises them to equally target the romantically indifferent, homosexuals, and skirt chasers who boast of the number of women they have used and discarded. Aoibheal tells them to be careful, however, not to leave any man unable to father children. She also states that abolishing priestly celibacy is something only the Vatican can do and counsels patience.

To the poet's horror, the younger woman angrily points him out as a 30-year-old bachelor and describes her many failed attempts to attract his interest in hopes of becoming his wife. She declares that he must be the first man to suffer the consequences of the new marriage law. As a crowd of infuriated women prepares to flog him into a quivering bowl of jelly, he awakens to find it was all a terrible nightmare.

== See also ==
- Clíodhna
