= Brian Ó Curnáin =

Irish linguist

Brian Ó Curnáin is an Irish dialectologist.

Ó Curnáin is a native of Dublin and spent time in the Connemara Gaeltacht during his youth.

He is a researcher in the School of Celtic Studies, Dublin Institute for Advanced Studies, and has published both articles and books. In 2016, he warned that the Gaeltacht would cease to exist within ten years due to "Government strategy ... was in crisis and unsustainable ... Irish speakers in Gaeltacht areas was decreasing and young people’s ability in the language was declining, mainly because of their socialisation through English." In 2018, he discovered a previously unknown Roscommon version of Cúirt an Mheán Oíche ('The Midnight Court') by the Co. Clare poet, Brian Merriman, written by Éamann Ó hOrchaidh.
