= Henry Richard Glynn =

Royal Navy Admiral (1768–1856)

Admiral Henry Richard Glynn (2 September 1768 – 20 July 1856) was a British Royal Navy officer.

Glynn entered the Royal Navy as a midshipman in 1780, and served in various parts of the world during his career, including the West Indies, Jamaica, Halifax, and the Baltic Sea. Glynn was aboard Lord Bridport's flagship, the Royal George at the Battle of Groix in 1795. In 1797, Glynn, as Captain of the Scourge, captured the French privateer La Furet.

He was promoted Admiral of the Blue in 1846.

== Sources ==
This article incorporates text from the Public Domain British Naval Biographical Dictionary (1849).

== See also ==
- O'Byrne, William Richard (1849). "Glynn, Henry Richard (a)" . A Naval Biographical Dictionary . John Murray – via Wikisource.
