= Johnny Glynn =

Johnny Glynn (c. 1912 – 10 January 1959) was President of the Irish Rugby Football Union.

Glynn was a native of Williamsgate Street, Galway. He played rugby for Galwegians and Connacht, winning twelve caps, later becoming a referee. He also served as president of his local club in 1958-59.

His death led to the two clubs creating a memorial trophy in his name known as the Glynn Cup, which would be played for between the clubs every Saint Patrick's Day.

Rugby union
Preceded by W. E. Crawford	President of the Irish Rugby Football Union; 1958 – 1959	Succeeded by J. R. Wheeler
