= Paul Glynn =

Australian writer and missionary priest (1928–2026)

The Reverend Paul Glynn SM, OAM
- Born: 2 November 1928; Lismore, New South Wales, Australia
- Died: 23 January 2026 (aged 97); Sydney, New South Wales, Australia
- Relatives: Tony Glynn (brother);
- Awards: Order of Australia Medal, The Order of the Rising Sun

Paul Glynn (2 November 1928 – 23 January 2026) was an Australian Marist missionary priest and writer. He was the author of several books, including A Song of Nagasaki (1988) and The Smile of the Ragpicker (1992), both best-sellers and translated into several languages. He had devoted a lifetime to reconciliation and friendship between Australia and Japan, the two former wartime enemies.

== Biography ==
Paul Glynn was an Australian Marist missionary priest and writer. He graduated from Southern Cross University; in 2010 the school awarded him an honorary doctorate for his reconciliation work with Japan. He lived in Japan for over 20 years, learning the country's language and culture through Buddhist texts. There he wrote A Song for Nagasaki, a book recounting the life of Takashi Nagai, a radiologist who converted to Catholicism and survived the atomic bomb dropped on Nagasaki. Glynn was also the author of The Smile of a Ragpicker and Like a Samurai – the Tony Glynn Story (see Tony Glynn).

Glynn was ordained a Catholic priest in 1953. He devoted a lifetime to reconciliation and friendship between Australia and Japan, the two former wartime foes. He was inspired to follow Padre Lionel Marsden, a former prisoner-of-war of the Japanese on the Burma Railway, to work for reconciliation with the people of Japan. He subsequently helped his brother Tony, who was also a promoter of reconciliation with Japan. He was a recipient of the Order of the Rising Sun from the Japanese government and the Medal of the Order of Australia (OAM) from the Australian government for reconciliation work between Japan and Australia. He initiated Australia's first Sister City relationship with a Japanese city – between Yamato Takada in Nara Prefecture and Lismore in northern New South Wales – half a century ago.

Glynn died on 23 January 2026, at the age of 97.

== Publications ==
- A Song for Nagasaki: The Story of Takashi Nagai: Scientist, Convert, and Survivor of the Atomic Bomb (with a foreword by Shusaku Endo), Ignatius Press, 2009, 267 pp. ISBN 1-58617-343-X; ISBN 978-1-58617-343-2 (1st edition: Hunters Hill, New South Wales, Catholic Book Club, 1988); (in French) Requiem pour Nagasaki, Nouvelle Cité, Montrouge, 1994 ISBN 2-85313-267-6; (in Italian) Un canto per Nagasaki, Little Red Apple Publishing, 1996, 169 pp. ISBN 1-875329-09-9; ISBN 978-1-875329-09-0; (in Spanish) Requiem por Nagasaki, Co-labora Consulting Estrategico, ISBN 84-605-8437-2; ISBN 978-84-605-8437-7; (in Indonesian) Paul Glynn, Gregor Neonbasu, Sebuah lagu untuk Nagasaki, Yayasan Mawar Sejati (Australia), 1999, 181 pp.
- (with Tōru Matsui) The smile of a ragpicker, 2nd edition, Marist Fathers Books, 1992, 196 pp. ISBN 0-949807-82-6; ISBN 978-0-949807-82-3; (in French) Le sourire de Satoko-San, une jeune femme chez les chiffonniers (or Le sourire de Satoko-San, la sœur des chiffonniers, Collection « Racines », Étouvans, Espace et Documents, 1996, 240 pp.
- Healing Fire from Frozen Earth: Lourdes and the Third Millennium, Marist Fathers Books, 2002, 195 pp. ISBN 0-9581844-0-2; ISBN 978-0-9581844-0-3
- Healing Fire of Christ: Reflections on Modern Miracles – Knock, Lourdes, Fatima, Ignatius Press, 2003, 260 pp. ISBN 0-89870-827-3; ISBN 978-0-89870-827-1
- Like a Samurai: The Tony Glynn Story, Marist Fathers Books, 2008, ISBN 0-9581844-2-9; ISBN 978-0-9581844-2-7
- Psalms: Songs for the Way Home, E.J. Dwyer, 1997, ISBN 0-85574-366-2; ISBN 978-0-85574-366-6
- Hearers of Silent Music, Catholic Book Club of Australia, 36 pp. ISBN 0-7316-4265-1; ISBN 978-0-7316-4265-6
- Thank you Brother Fire, Catholic Book Club, 1984, ISBN 0-9590451-0-4; ISBN 978-0-9590451-0-9
- The Wayside Stream: About Reconciliation in Families, Communities and Between, Marist Fathers Books, 2003, ISBN 0-9581844-1-0; ISBN 978-0-9581844-1-0
