= Mary Ann Glynn =

American academic

- Education: Fordham University; Rider University; Long Island University; Columbia University
- Occupation: Academic
- Employer: Boston College

Mary Ann Glynn is an American academic. She is the Joseph F. Cotter Professor of Management and Organization at Boston College's Carroll School of Management, and the president of the Academy of Management.
