= Klaxon (EP) =

Single by Immi

from the album Switch
- Released: March 12, 2008
- Recorded: 2008
- Genre: Electropop
- Length: 12:37
- Label: Grand Funk
- Songwriter: Immi
- Producer: NAiD

Immi singles chronology
| "Cosmic Pink" (2007) | "Klaxon" (2008) | "RimmiX" (2009) |

"Klaxon" (クラクション, Kurakushon) is the second extended play by Japanese electropop singer Immi. It was released virtually on March 12, 2008 by indie label Grand Trax.

== Music Video ==
The music video of "Klaxon" was directed by French director Ai-HZ.

== Track Listing ==
All tracks are written by Immi, except for track 3.

CD
| No. | Title | Length |
|---|---|---|
| 1. | "Klaxon (クラクション)" | 5:05 |
| 2. | "Girlfriend" | 3:14 |
| 3. | "Lovesong" (The Cure cover) | 4:18 |

== Charts ==
| Chart (2011) | Peak position |
|---|---|
| iTunes Japan Dance Chart | 4 |
