= Brian Merriman =

Irish poet

- Brian Mac Giolla Meidhre
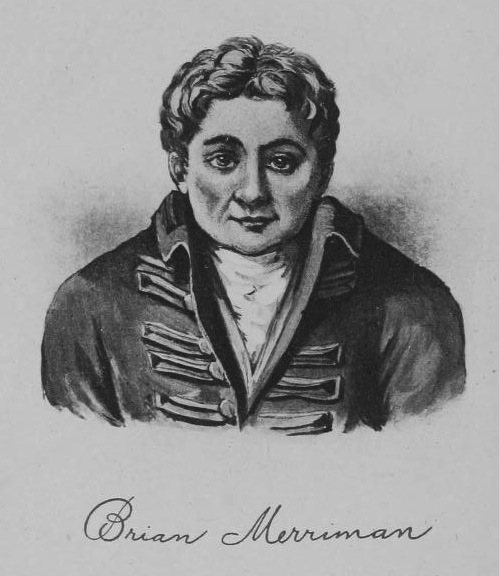
- 1880 portrait
- Born: c. 1747; County Clare, Ireland
- Died: 27 July 1805 (about 58); Limerick, Ireland
- Resting place: Feakle Graveyard
- Occupation: Teacher
- Spouse: Kathleen Collins
- Children: 2
- Writing career
- Language: Irish (Early Modern Irish, Munster Irish)
- Genres: Aisling, parody
- Notable work: Cúirt an Mheán Oíche

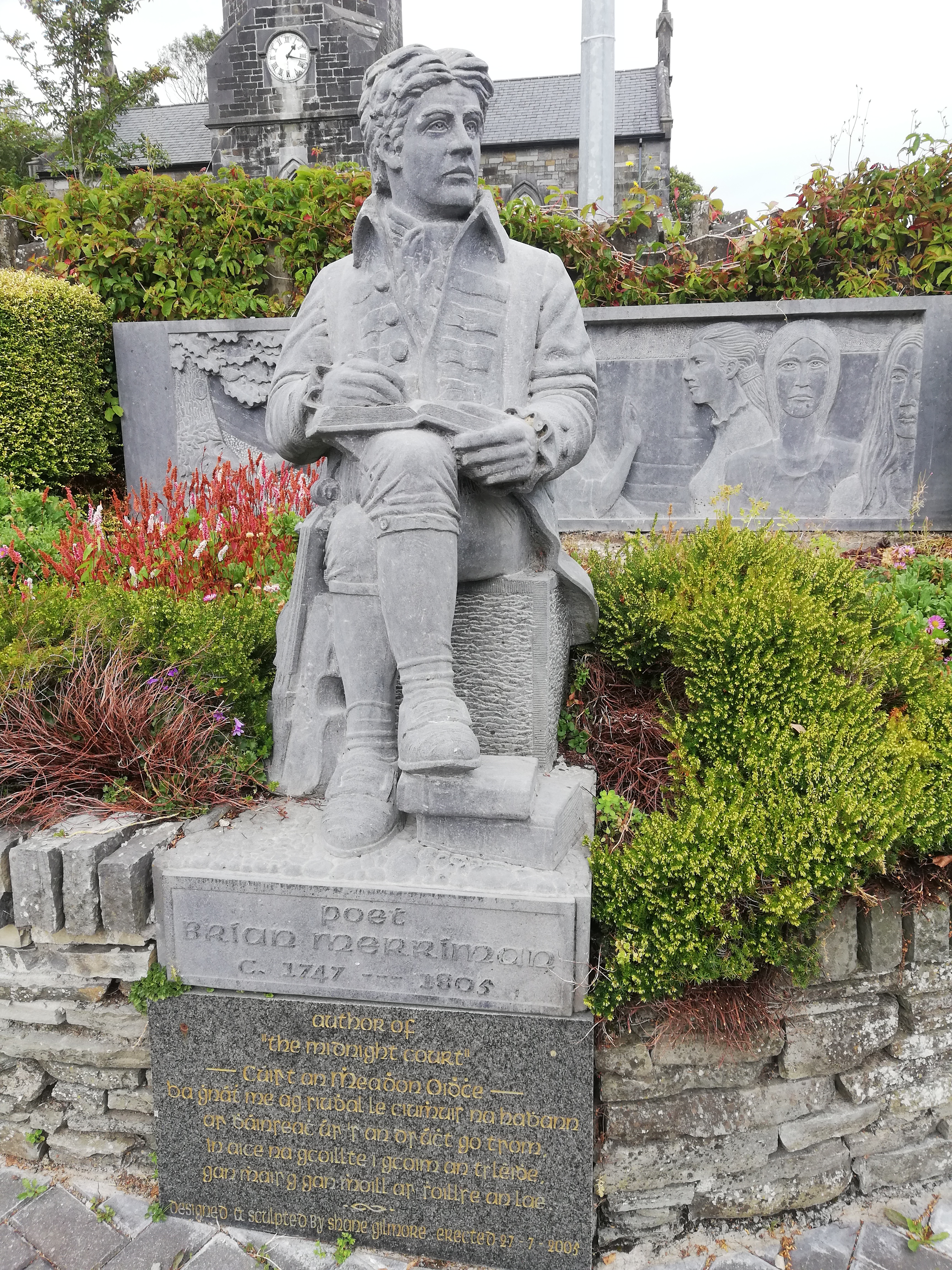
A statue of Merriman at Ennistymon

Brian Merriman or in Irish Brian Mac Giolla Meidhre (c. 1747 – 27 July 1805) was an 18th-century Irish-language bard, farmer, hedge school teacher, and Irish traditional musician from rural County Clare.

Long after his death, Merriman's life drew wide attention after his single surviving work of substance was collected from the local oral tradition, written down, and published for the first time. The poem, called Cúirt an Mheán Oíche in Irish and The Midnight Court in English, is a 1000-line long parody of the Aisling, or dream vision poetry tradition, the battle of the sexes, and Mythopoeic fictionalisations of Irish mythology.

The poem describes a lawsuit before the judicial bench of Aoibheal, a former goddess from Irish mythology who had been demoted to queen of the fairies since the Christianization the Irish people by Saint Patrick. In what has been described as, "a battle of the sexes in fairyland", the women of Ireland are suing the men for refusing to get married and father children. The poet versifies the self-justifying arguments and bottomless self-pity of the morally bankrupt lawyers for both genders, which are then answered by the judge's ruling that all laymen must marry before the age of 20 or face flogging at the hands of Ireland's understandably frustrated and outraged women. The poet is saved from being the first flogging victim at the last minute by waking up and realizing that the trial was all a nightmare.

Brian Merriman's Cúirt an Mheán Oíche has been compared to the works of Ovid, Geoffrey Chaucer, Miguel de Cervantes, François Rabelais, Dante Alighieri, Jonathan Swift, Alasdair mac Mhaighstir Alasdair, William Blake, Robert Burns, and Henry Fielding. It is widely regarded as the greatest work of Irish comic poetry and one of the most iconic works in the history of Irish literature in any language. Merriman's parody of the fantasy genre and of the moral foibles of small town Gaels have also had many emulators; including Fr. Allan MacDonald, Liam O'Flaherty, Máirtín Ó Cadhain, Flann O'Brien, and Seamus Heaney. Merriman's poem has also been adapted at least twice into a stage play and once into an opera by living composer of Classical music Ana Sokolovic.

== Merriman's life ==
In accounts collected from the local oral tradition long after his death, Brian Merriman was said to have been born illegitimately in Clondagad or Ennistymon, County Clare. His father is said to have been either an outlawed and fugitive Roman Catholic priest who was on the run from the priest hunters, or an Anglo-Irish landlord. His mother, though, is known to have been surnamed Quilkeen.

Shortly after his birth, Merriman's mother married a stonemason who was working on the walls of the Deer Park at Ennistymon House, which later became the Falls Hotel. The family moved to Feakle, where Merriman would have grown up travelling for illegal and secret religious worship to a Mass rock, which is still extant at the megalithic tomb in the nearby Ballycroum bog.

According to Daniel Corkery, it is still not known, "how nor where", Brian Merriman, "got his education. Perhaps in some hedge school, or intermittently at the feet of some wandering poet or priest, one bearing with him the relics of a nation's culture, the other the credentials of Louvain or Salamanca."

Merriman is known, after he grew up, to have become the teacher of the illegal hedge school for the townland of Kilclaren. He is also said in the local oral tradition to have been a stout man with black hair with an interest in Irish traditional music and who was reportedly a very talented fiddler.

Also according to the local oral tradition, Brian Merriman was employed for a time as resident tutor to the children of a local Protestant and Anglo-Irish landlord.

According to Daniel Corkery, this would not have been uncommon at the time. The Irish language was still spoken so pervasively throughout 18th-century Ireland that many landlords and their families had to learn at least Irish to communicate with their household servants, tenant farmers, and hired labourers. Furthermore, the oral poetry composed in Munster Irish throughout the 18th century, which is replete with allusions to both Classical and Irish mythology, includes many of the greatest and most immortal works of Irish literature in the Irish language.

Corkery writes, therefore, "Such men cannot be thought of as wayside singers who rhymes the local event. They were what they claimed to be, the literati of a people."

But it is unlikely that Merriman's employers were aware of this fact or of their resident tutor's enormous significance to Modern literature in Irish. As Daniel Corkery further writes, "The first article in an Ascendancy's creed is that the natives are a lesser breed and that anything that is theirs (except their land and their gold!) is therefore of little value. If they have had a language and a literature, it cannot have been a civilised language, cannot have been anything but a patois used by the hillmen among themselves; and as for their literature, the less said about it the better."

Corkery further explains that Merriman and other poets of the era like him, "were all poor men, very often sore-troubled where and how to find shelter, clothing, food, at the end of a day's tramping. Their native culture is ancient, harking back to pre-Renaissance standards; but there is no inflow of books from outside to impregnate it with new thoughts. Their language is dying: around them is the drip, drip of callous decay: famine overtakes famine, or the people are cleared from the land to make room for bullocks. The rocks in hidden mountain clefts are the only altars left to them; and teaching is a felony."

Even so, Corkery continues, the Irish-language poetry of the era, "is, contrariwise, a rich thing, a marvellous inheritance, bright with music, flushed with colour, deep with human feeling. To see it against the dark world that threw it up, is to be astonished, if not dazzled."

According to the local oral tradition, Brian Merriman was inspired to compose Cúirt an Mheán Oíche, just as the poem describes, by having a nightmare while sleeping along the shores of Loch Gréine. According to other accounts, Merriman composed the poem while recovering from a leg injury that left him unable to work. As is the tradition in Irish culture, Merriman taught his poem to the local seanchaithe, who memorised it and passed it down generation after generation. Like many other works of Munster Irish poetry from the same era, "The Midnight Court", according to Daniel Corkery, "almost two hundred years after its creation, has been found alive on the lips of fishermen and ditchers!"

According to Frank O'Connor, Brian Merriman "was a fine poet" and was every bit the equal of his contemporaries Jonathan Swift, Oliver Goldsmith, and Robert Burns. Ciaran Carson, however, has gone even farther and has compared Merriman's mastery of language with that of Italian national poet Dante Alighieri.

According to Seán Ó Tuama, "The Midnight Court is undoubtedly one of the greatest comic works of literature, and certainly the greatest comic poem ever written in Ireland. … It is a poem of gargantuan energy, moving clearly and pulsatingly along a simple story line, with a middle, a beginning and an end. For a poem of over one thousand lines it has few longeurs. It is full of tumultuous bouts of great good humour, verbal dexterity and rabelesian ribaldry. It is a mammoth readable achievement with little need of gloss."

Of the poem's infamous bawdiness, William Butler Yeats, "Had Mac Giolla Meidhre before his mind the fires of Saint John's Night, for all through Munster men and women leaped the fires that they might be fruitful, and after scattered the ashes that the fields might be fruitful also? Certainly it is not possible to read his verses without being shocked and horrified as city onlookers were perhaps shocked and horrified at the free speech and buffoonery of some traditional country festival. He wrote at a moment of national discouragement: the Penal Laws were still in force though weakening, the old order was a vivid memory, but, with the failure of the last Jacobite rising, hope of its return had vanished, and no new political dream had come."

As the morally bankrupt lawyer for the women famously urges him to do in the poem, Merriman married Feakle resident Kathleen Collins around 1787 and became the father of two daughters. Some years later, possibly due to relaxation of Penal Laws forbidding Catholics from owning land by the 1793 Catholic Relief Act, Merriman is known to have owned a 20-acre (81,000 m^{2}) farm near Loch Gréine. In 1797, the Royal Dublin Society awarded Merriman two prizes for his flax crop.

Around 1800, the Merriman family moved to Limerick City. According to the oral tradition, Merriman moved his family because he feared that his prosperous farm in Feakle might cause local men to kidnap his two beautiful daughters for the purposes of forced marriage. In Limerick City, Merriman continued to teach.

Brian Merriman died on Saturday 27 July 1805. His death was recorded two days later in the General Advertiser and Limerick Gazette: "Died – on Saturday morning, in Old Clare-street, after a few days' illness, Mr Bryan Merryman, teacher of Mathematics, etc." About Merriman's death, Frank O'Connor has alleged, incorrectly, "Irish literature in the Irish language may be said to have died with him."

Yeats, on the other hand, wrote, "Standish Hayes O'Grady has described The Midnight Court as the best poem written in Gaelic, and as I read Mr. Ussher's translation I have felt, without sharing what seems to me an extravagant opinion, that Mac Giolla Meidhre, had political circumstances been different, might have founded a modern Gaelic literature."

At his own request, Brian Merriman's body was returned to his native district and now lies buried in Feakle graveyard. In August 1992, a stone monument to Brian Merriman, with the opening lines of Cúirt an Mheán Oíche carved in Irish, was dedicated by Seamus Heaney and still stands overlooking the site of the 18th-century Bard's famous nap along the shores of Loch Gréine.

Furthermore, in 2018, Irish dialectologist Brian Ó Curnáin announced the discovery of an 1817 manuscript of Cúirt an Mheán Oíche in the archives of the Royal Irish Academy. The manuscript, which is signed Éamann Ó hOrchaidh, renders the poem not into the County Clare dialect of the Munster Irish spoken by Brian Merriman, but into the now-extinct dialect of Connacht Irish formerly spoken in County Roscommon. The discovery is regarded as priceless in what it reveals of a now vanished dialect of the Irish language.

== Cúirt an Mheán Oíche ==
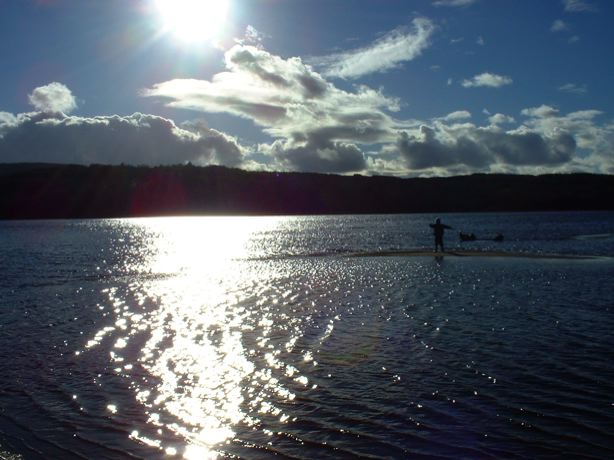
Loch Gréine

In the original spelling, the poem is called Cúirt an Ṁeaḋon Oiḋċe [ˈkuːɾˠtʲ ə ˈvʲaːnˠ ˈiːçɪ]. The modernisation Cúirt an Mheon-Oíche is also encountered.

In the opening section of the poem, the poet declares his love for walking alone in the countryside of County Clare, which he describes lyrically. After walking past a red fox being pursued by hunters on horseback, the poet walks to the shore of Loch Gréine and lays down to take a nap in a ditch. Then, a hideous giantess appears, who carries a staff to which a bailiff's warrant has been nailed. The giantess wakes up the poet, scolds him for sleeping in a ditch while court is in session, and drags him kicking and screaming into the presence of Aoibheal, the Queen of all the Fairies in County Clare.

On the way to the ruined church at Moynoe, the giantess explains that the Queen is disgusted by the destruction of the clan system, the Flight of the Wild Geese, the exile or outlawry of the Clan Chiefs, and their replacement by lowborn but greedy Protestant and Anglo-Irish landlords, "who pick the bones of the Irish clean." Furthermore, the Queen is also horrified by how the judges invariably twist English Law to always support the new Protestant Ascendancy. The giantess further explains that Aoibheal is even more concerned that Ireland's men are refusing to marry and father children and that if something is not done, the Irish people will face extinction. Therefore, the Queen is taking the implementation of justice upon herself. When the giant and the Bard arrive at the ruined church, there follows a traditional court case under the Brehon law form of a two-part debate followed by the judge's ruling.

In the first part, a young woman declares her case against the young men of Ireland for their refusal to marry. She complains that despite increasingly desperate flirtation at hurling matches, wakes, and pattern days, the young men insist on ignoring her in favour of late marriages to richer, older, uglier, and often extremely shrewish women. The young woman describes at length her use of pishogues, Satanism, and black magic, which have also failed to gain her a husband. The young woman then bewails the contempt with which she is treated by the married women of the village.

She is answered by an old man who first denounces the wanton promiscuity of young women in general, suggesting that the young woman who spoke before was conceived by a Tinker in a ditch. He vividly describes the infidelity of his own young wife. He declares his humiliation at finding her already pregnant on their wedding night and the gossip which has surrounded the "premature" birth of "his" son ever since. Then, however, the old man declares that there is nothing wrong with his wife's illegitimate children and denounces marriage as "out of date." He demands that the Queen outlaw it altogether and replace it with a system of free love.

The young woman, however, is infuriated by the old' man's words and is barely restrained from physically assaulting him.

The young woman explains that the old man's wife was a homeless beggar who married him to avoid starvation. She graphically describes the many, many attempts that the old man's wife made to consummate the marriage, only to find her elderly husband impotent. She tells the old man that if his wife has taken a lover, she well deserves one. The young woman then calls for the abolition of priestly celibacy, alleging that priests would otherwise make wonderful husbands and fathers. She declares that many lonely women are already being "consoled" by priests, who are regularly fathering children under other men's names. In conclusion, the young woman declares that she will keep trying to attract an older man in hopes that her unmarried humiliation will finally end.

Finally, in the judgement section, Queen Aoibheal announces that there is nothing wrong with marriage and that she admires men who work hard every day to provide for their families. She, therefore, rules that all laymen must marry before the age of 21, on pain of flogging at the hands of Ireland's women. She advises the women to equally target the romantically indifferent, homosexuals, and rakes who boast of the numbers of single and married women whose lives they have ruined. Aoibheal tells the women to be careful, however, not to flog any man until he is unable to father children. She also states that abolishing priestly celibacy is beyond her mandate. She expresses a belief, however, that the Pope will soon allow priests to openly act on their carnal urges and counsels patience until then.

To the poet's horror, the young woman angrily points him out as a 30-year-old bachelor and describes her many failed attempts to become his wife. She declares that, despite the poet's crooked back and extreme ugliness, none of that would matter in a darkened bedroom. She therefore demands that Merriman must be the first man to suffer the consequences of the new marriage law. As a crowd of infuriated single women gleefully prepares to flog Brian Merriman into a quivering bowl of jelly, he awakens along the shore of Loch Gréine to find it was all a terrible nightmare.

== Influence ==
=== Language and metre ===
The language of Merriman's poem is a mixture of the Classical Gaelic literary language of the Bards with everyday Munster Irish, the vernacular of rural County Clare during the late 18th century. The meter is the rarely used Dactylic Trimeter followed by a single Trochaic foot. The end rhymes are all feminine.

In a 1926 preface to Arland Ussher's translation, William Butler Yeats wrote, "Brian Mac Giolla Meidhre – or to put it in English, Brian Merriman – wrote in Gaelic, one final and three internal rhymes, pouring all his mediaeval abundance into that narrow neck."

=== Classical studies ===
At least two lines from Merriman's poem have been identified as very close translations of the erotic poetry of Ovid into Munster Irish. Although it was once widely assumed that Gaelic Ireland completely missed Renaissance humanism and the revival of interest in the Classics, this is not surprising. Pioneering antiquarian and Celticist Charles O'Conor of Bellanagare (1710 - 1791), a descendant of the Gaelic nobility of Ireland, received his early education at a hedge school taught by the surviving Franciscans of Creevelea Abbey and later recalled in his memoirs that he was taught the Latin language using the grammar of Corderius, and the writings of Ovid, Suetonius, and Erasmus.

Furthermore, Aoibheal's ultimate ruling at the climax of Merriman's poem, that all single men either marry or face flogging by the local women, represents a revival of the traditional form of social pressure used against unmarried men in the ancient Greek Polis of Sparta. As the teaching of the Greek language, using similarly ancient texts as those used to teach Latin, was just as common in Irish hedge schools at the time, Merriman as a hedge schoolmaster was almost certainly aware of the tradition regarding Spartan men who spurned marriage well before composing his poem.

=== The Poetic Courts ===
According to Daniel Corkery, in 18th century Munster, a custom similar to the Welsh Eisteddfod existed. In what was also both mimicry and satire of the ceremonial of the English-dominated legal and court system, the Chief-Bard of a district would preside over sessions of a Cúirt, or Poetic Court. Like the trial in Merriman's poem, a Munster Cúirt would begin with "bailiffs" delivering often humorously worded "warrants" which summoned local Irish-language poets to a Bardic competition presided over by the Chief-Bard as "judge". In many cases, two Irish-language poets at the Cúirt would engage in Flyting; a mixture of debate poetry and the improvised trading of insults in verse, much like that between the two lawyers in Merriman's poem. Also according to Corkery, much of the serious, improvised, and comic poetry in the Irish-language composed for sessions of the Munster Poetic Courts was written down by the Court "Recorders" and still survives.

=== Satire of Jacobite poetry ===
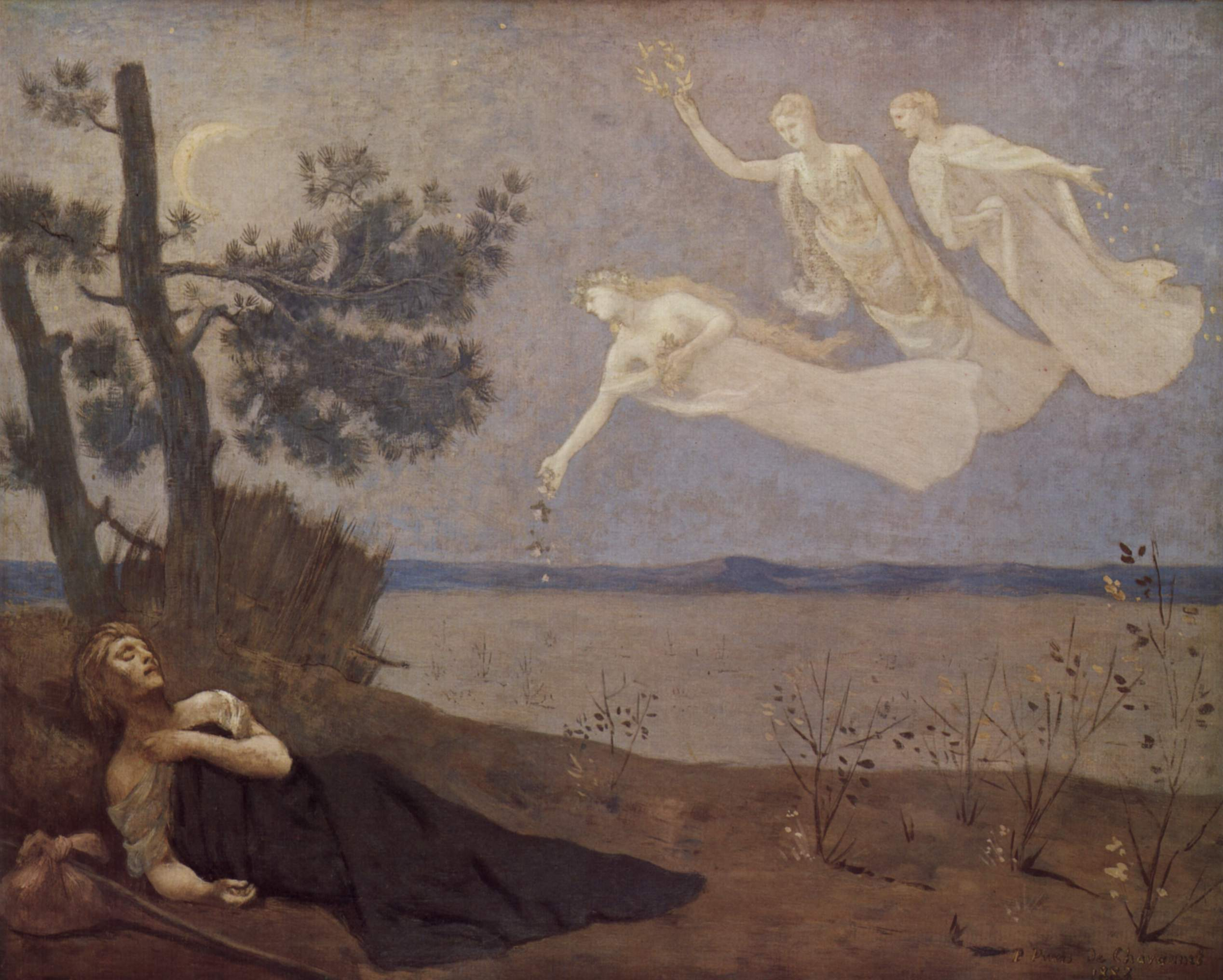
Pierre-Cécile Puvis de Chavannes: An Aisling, 1883

The poem begins by satirizing the Mythopoeic conventions of the Aisling, or Dream vision poem. According to Daniel Corkery, "The Aisling proper is Jacobite poetry; and a typical example would run something like this: The poet, weak with thinking of the woe that has overtaken the Gael, falls into a deep slumber. In his dreaming a figure of radiant beauty draws near. She is so bright, so stately, the poet imagines her one of the immortals. Is she Deirdre? Is she Gearnait? Or is she Helen? Or Venus? He questions her, and learns that she is Erin; and her sorrow, he is told, is for her true mate who is in exile beyond the seas. This true mate is, according to the date of the composition, either the Old or Young Pretender; and the poem ends with a promise of speedy redemption on the return of the King's son."

According to Ciarán Carson, "Merriman subverted all that. His fairy woman is not beautiful, but a threatening monster. The vision that she discloses is not of a future paradise, but a present reality. Merriman's poem, for all its rhetorical and satirical extravagance, gives us a real sense of what life must have been like in 18th century Ireland: its people and their speech, their gestures, their dress, their food and drink, their recreations, and, of course, their sexual mores. The atmosphere of the 'court' is not so much that of a court of law, but of a country market, filled with verbal commotion and colour. For all that, it is still a dream-world, where Merriman can free himself from the restraints of conventional discourse, swooping from high rhetoric to street-talk in the space of a few lines – much as Dante did in the Inferno, which is also an aisling. And language is very much a concern of the aisling: a recurrent theme is the poet's lament for the decline of Irish, and its support mechanism of noble patronage."

=== Alleged satire of Christian morality ===
Ciarán Carson writes that the Old Man's praise of illegitimacy before the Court bolsters the oral tradition of County Clare, which alleges that Brian Merriman was born out of wedlock. Carson also writes that some literary scholars believe Merriman may have been aware of the similar sentiments expressed in the 1728 poem The Bastard by Richard Savage.

While Yeats points out the plot similarities between The Midnight Court and Jonathan Swift's Cadenus and Vanessa, he also expresses a belief that Merriman was mainly inspired by Irish folklore and mythology, particularly the love stories told about the demigods Cuchulain and Diarmuid Ua Duibhne and anti-Christian debate poetry such as the, "old dialogues where Oisín railed at Patrick." Yeats argued that Merriman's poem may be considered, "more than the last song of Irish Paganism," but as similar to other works of religious satire from the so-called Age of Reason, including Robert Burns' Holy Willie's Prayer, Address to the Deil, and William Blake's Marriage of Heaven and Hell.

In response to the same accusations that Brian Merriman must have read and emulated the anti-Christian writings of Voltaire and other similar writers of the era, Vivian Mercier, like Yeats, has argued that Merriman was using the conventions of Irish traditional literature to make fun of the moral failings of the Irish people during his own era. For example, when mentioning the moment when the female lawyer taunts Brian Merriman for being thirty years old and still unmarried, Vivian Mercier points out that the women of the Aran Islands taunted John Millington Synge in exactly the same way. The male and female lawyers' denunciations of unhappy marriages, whether they were entered into for the wrong or the right reasons, are also part of a very old and long established tradition in Irish literature in the Irish language. To drive this point home, Mercier, drawing upon a 1913 article by literary scholar T. F. O'Rahilly, which cites many other works of both Irish bardic poetry and Seán nos songs whose narrators are every bit as bawdy, blasphemous, narcissistic, and seemingly nihilistic as the two lawyers and the judge in Merriman's poem. Like O'Rahilly before him, Mercier singles out for particular attention An Seanduine ("The Old Man"), An tSeanbhean ("The Old Woman"), An tArrachtach Sean ("The Old Monster"), and An Fear Brónach d'éis a Phósda ("The Sorrowful Man After His Marriage").

In a 1993 lecture on Brian Merriman's life and work, Seamus Heaney expressed a then commonly held belief that Brian Merriman supported the "solutions" argued by the two lawyers: the complete rejection of Christian morality by the Gaels, the end of sexual repression through the embrace of free love, and allowing, "the psychosexual demons" to run rampant; a dream which Heaney described as fulfilled by the Secularization of Ireland since the 1960s.

In a 2006 review for The Guardian of Ana Sokolovic's new operatic adaptation of the poem, Tom Service expressed a very similar interpretation of Brian Merriman's literary intentions, which Service termed a, "plea for sexual liberation", "a battle of the sexes in fairyland", and, "a radical critique of the repressive Catholic Church in the 18th century". Service, however, harshly criticized the female lawyer as, "a petulant, infantile 18th-century Bridget Jones, complaining that despite her charms, she can find no one to marry", and termed the character of the men's lawyer nothing short of, "odious". Service lamented, however, that, "In the 21st [century], the moral of the story seems quaint and anachronistic."

Similarly to Piaras Beaslai, who had alleged in 1913, "Brian [Merriman] was essentially a moralist", Vivian Mercier disagreed strongly with those who interpreted Cúirt an Mheán Oíche as a call for sexual revolution. According to Mercier, Merriman was drawing upon a centuries-old tradition in Irish language satirical poetry, such as the hugely influential Pairlement Chloinne Tomáis and Egan O'Rahilly's Eachtra Thaidhg Dhuibhne Uí Chróinín; which were both composed as lampoons against the small minority of lower class Gaels who enriched themselves by converting to Puritanism and collaborating with the new elite against their own people during and after the Cromwellian conquest of Ireland. According to Mercier, it is a long established tradition in such poems that an unsympathetic character or characters speaks very similarly to the male and female lawyers and accordingly, "convicts [themselves] out of [their] own mouth". It is very possible if not highly likely, therefore, that like many other bawdy and seemingly blasphemous and nihilistic poets in Munster Irish from the same era, that Brian Merriman, "was no more anti-Christian than Villon", or Chaucer.

=== Significance ===
Due to Merriman's mockery of a dystopian Ireland where the practice of Christian morality has been replaced by all of the Seven Deadly Sins, his satirical treatment of the battle of the sexes, and his devastating social commentary, Cúirt an Mheán Óiche is a unique work in the history of Irish poetry in either language.

== Legacy ==
=== Literary and cultural legacy ===
Like much Irish and Scottish Gaelic oral poetry Cúirt an Mheán Oíche was preserved mainly by being memorized by successive generations of local seanchaithe although a manuscript of the poem written by Merriman himself does exist in Cambridge University Library. It was eventually published in 1850, by the Irish language poetry collector John O'Daly. Both before and since its first publication, Merriman's masterpiece has had an enormous literary influence.

In his comic verse drama in Scottish Gaelic, Parlamaid nan Cailleach ("The Parliament of Hags"), Roman Catholic priest Fr. Allan MacDonald (1959–1905) of Eriskay lampoons the gossiping of his female parishioners and the courtship and marriage customs of the Hebrides. Ronald Black, a well known scholar of Scottish Gaelic literature, has compared the play to similar works comic poetry from Irish literature in the Irish language, such as Domhnall Ó Colmáin's 1670 Párliament na mBan ("The Women's Parliament") and Brian Merriman's 1780 Cúirt an Mheán Oíche ("The Midnight Court").

In recent years, Merriman's poem and other Irish and Scottish Gaelic comic poetry have been admired, praised, and emulated by modern Irish poets, including Seamus Heaney and Thomas Kinsella.

The influence Merriman's Cervantes-esque parody of the fantasy genre may also be seen in the iconic 1938 metafictional, magical realist, and satirical novel At Swim-Two-Birds by Flann O'Brien. O'Brien, a career official of the Irish Civil Service following the War of Independence, had studied Irish language comic literature at University College Dublin and accordingly wrote about a novelist whose characters, many of whom, similarly to Aoibheal, are extremely brutal parodies of revered figures from Irish folklore and mythology, are so outraged by their author's terrible writing that they revolt against him and plot his early demise to have control over their own lives.

In Modern literature in Irish, Merriman's influence is also seen in the equally iconic 1948 novel Cré na Cille, by Máirtín Ó Cadhain. The whole novel takes place during Irish neutrality in the Second World War and is written in the voices of the dead bodies buried in a rural Connemara cemetery, who remain conscious inside their coffins. The dead proceed, however, to spend the whole novel viciously quarrelling with one another about past events in their lives and romantic relationships, about who was right and who was wrong during the Irish Civil War, and, most of all, about the social status or lack thereof of the speakers when they were still alive in their local parishes and villages.

=== Literary translations ===
In the 20th century, a number of translations were produced. Translators have generally rendered Cúirt an Mheán Óiche into iambic pentameter and heroic couplets. Ciarán Carson, however, chose to closely reproduce Merriman's original dactylic meter, which he found very similar to the 6/8 rhythm of Irish jigs, and heavy use of alliteration.

According to Frank O'Connor, a German translation of Cúirt an Mheán Óiche also exists.

Notable English versions have been made by Anglo-Irish poets Arland Ussher, Edward Pakenham, 6th Earl of Longford, and by the Irish Jewish poet David Marcus. A free verse translation has been made by Thomas Kinsella and a partial rhymed translation by Seamus Heaney. Brendan Behan is believed to have written an unpublished version, since lost.

Frank O'Connor's translation into heroic couplets, which is the most popular, was banned by the Censorship Board of the Irish State in 1945. Soon after, O'Connor's translation was attacked in print and O'Connor replied. O'Connor alleges that the subsequent debate in The Irish Times, "on the banning of my translation... would make a substantial and informing booklet." The debate began when Professor James Hogan of the National University of Ireland claimed to have found, after reading Cúirt an Mheán Óiche in a literary translation into German, that O'Connor had introduced a blasphemous line that wasn't in the original text. O'Connor responded in print that Professor Hogan did not know enough German to read an Irish language poem in the original. O'Connor also wrote that everything in his translation that the Irish State considered to be obscene was also present in Merriman's original poem in Irish. In his book, A Short History of Irish Literature, O'Connor cites the banning of his translation among several other examples of the crippling effect that the wartime censorship imposed by Taoiseach Éamon de Valera was having upon Irish literature.

At the same time, however, Frank O'Connor later published his formerly banned translation in Kings, Lords, and Commons: An Anthology from the Irish, a 1958 collection of his Irish-English poetry translations, which spanned what he considered the whole literary canon, from the first millennium to the 1805 death of Brian Merriman in Limerick City. Writing during the late 1960s, Terence de Vere White commented that, "Kings, Lords, and Commons had a wide readership in Britain as well as in Ireland and the United States". Terence de Vere White according credits Frank O'Connor, through that single volume, with, "opening English eyes to the existence", and the achievements of Irish poetry in the Irish language.

In a review for The Guardian of Ciarán Carson's 2006 translation of Cúirt an Mheán Óiche, David Wheately wrote, "When it came to translating Merriman's poem, the temptation might have been to put its four-stressed lines into Swiftian octosyllabics, but instead he has opted for the hop, step and jump of an anapestic beat. According to Carson's introduction, however, his real inspiration was the 6/8 rhythm of Irish jigs, which as a fiddler himself Merriman would have known well. ... The alphabet soup of earlier Carson books such as First Language serves him well here with the alliterative riffing of the Gaelic metre (befuddled and boozed in a bibulous Babel)... For all its problems with the censor, Frank O'Connor's version is the drawing room performance; this one's for the shebeen in the wee small hours."

In an article about his own translation of Merriman's poem, Ciaran Carson wrote, "On the morning of New Year's Day 2005 – the year of the 200th anniversary of Merriman's death – I dreamed about Merriman. I was wandering on a dark hillside when I saw a light in the distance. I followed it, and came to a little house. The door was ajar; timidly, I pushed it open. Merriman was sitting by the hearth, wearing a greatcoat. He gestured at me to sit down. I did so, and we conversed. True, he did most of the talking, but I was fully able to follow the flow of his intricate Irish. I cannot remember what was said. When I awoke, I was disappointed to find my Irish restored to its former poverty. But I felt that I had been touched, just a little, by the hand of the Master."

=== Legacy in County Clare ===
Cumann Merriman was founded in 1967 to promote the poet's work. They run an annual Merriman Summer School in County Clare each August. John Ardagh, who visited the annual Merriman festival in the region during the 1990s, described the event as, "very merry."

In 2005, the Clare County Library released a CD recording of a local seanchaí reciting Cúirt an Mheán Óiche in the traditional oral manner. Although it has not been made available for purchase, Cumann Merriman has posted excerpts on their website. For added contrast, the same passages are also reproduced from a modern dramatic reading of the poem.

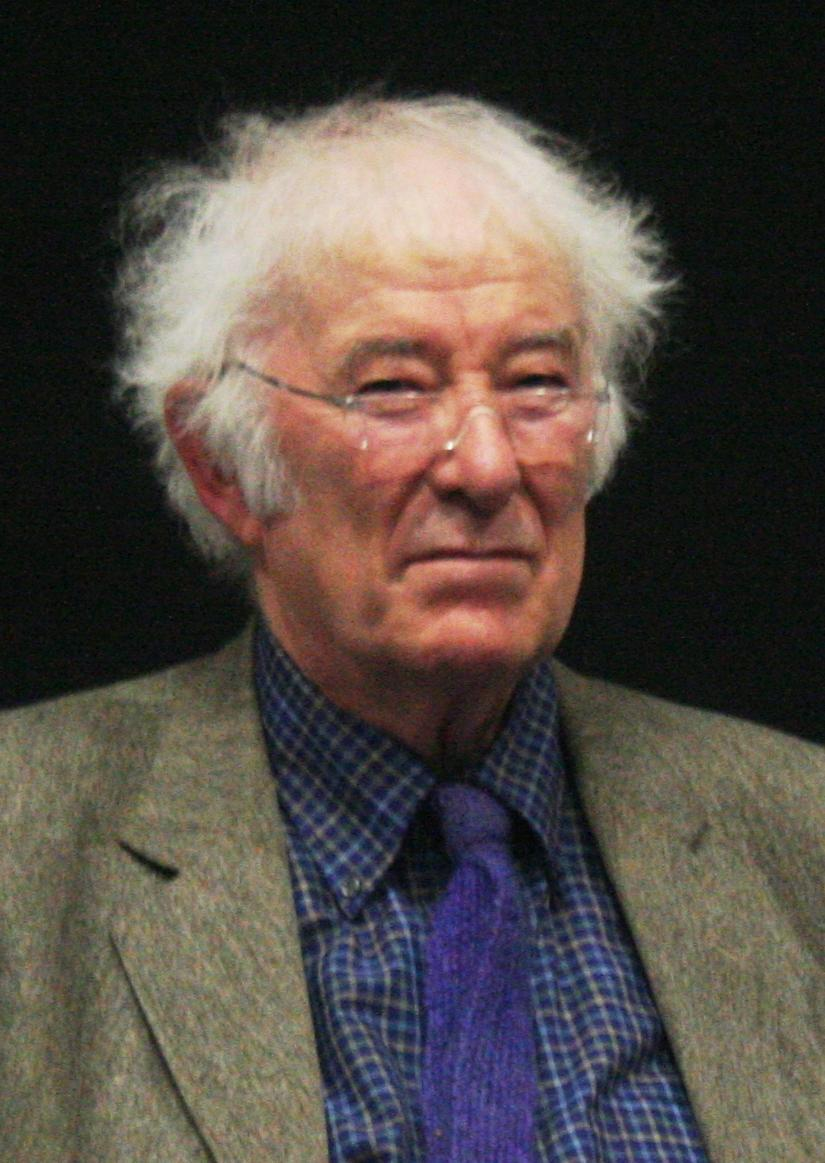
Seamus Heaney (1939–2013)

At the end of a 1993 lecture on Merriman's life and work, Seamus Heaney declared, "Perhaps I can convey the ongoing reality of the poem's life more simply by recollecting a Saturday evening last August when I had the privilege of unveiling a memorial to Brian Merriman on the shore of Lough Graney in Co. Clare, where the opening scene of 'The Midnight Court' is set. The memorial is a large stone quarried from a hill overlooking the lake, and the opening lines are carved on it in Irish. The people who attended the ceremony were almost all from the local district, and were eager to point out the exact corner of the nearby field where the poet had run his hedge school, and the spot on the lough shore where he had fallen asleep and had his vision. This was, and is, the first circle where Merriman's poem flourished and continues to flourish. Later that evening, for example, in a marquee a couple of miles down the road, we attended a performance by the Druid Theatre Company from Galway in which the poem was given a dramatic presentation with all the boost and blast-off that song and music and topical allusion could provide. Again, hundreds of local people were in the tent, shouting and taking sides like a football crowd, as the old man and the young woman battled it out and the president of the court gave her judgement. The psychosexual demons were no longer at bay but rampant and fully recognised, so that the audience, at the end of the performance, came away from the experience every bit as accused and absolved as the poet himself at the end of his poem. The 'profane perfection of mankind' was going ahead and civilisation was being kept on course; in a ceremony that was entirely convincing and contemporary, Orpheus has been remembered in Ireland."

== In popular culture ==
- Cúirt an Mheán Oíche has been adapted into stage plays by acclaimed Irish playwrights Tom MacIntyre and Celia de Fréine.
- Cúirt an Mheán Oíche has also been adapted into a 2018 opera by award-winning Serbian-Canadian composer of modern Classical music Ana Sokolović, based on an English-language libretto by Paul Bentley.

== See also ==
- Aisling
- Alasdair Mac Mhaighstir Alasdair
- Bored of the Rings
- The Dream of Rhonabwy
- Flann O'Brien
- Irish poetry
- List of Irish poets
- Máirtín Ó Cadhain
