= Denis Florence MacCarthy =

Irish poet (1817–1882)

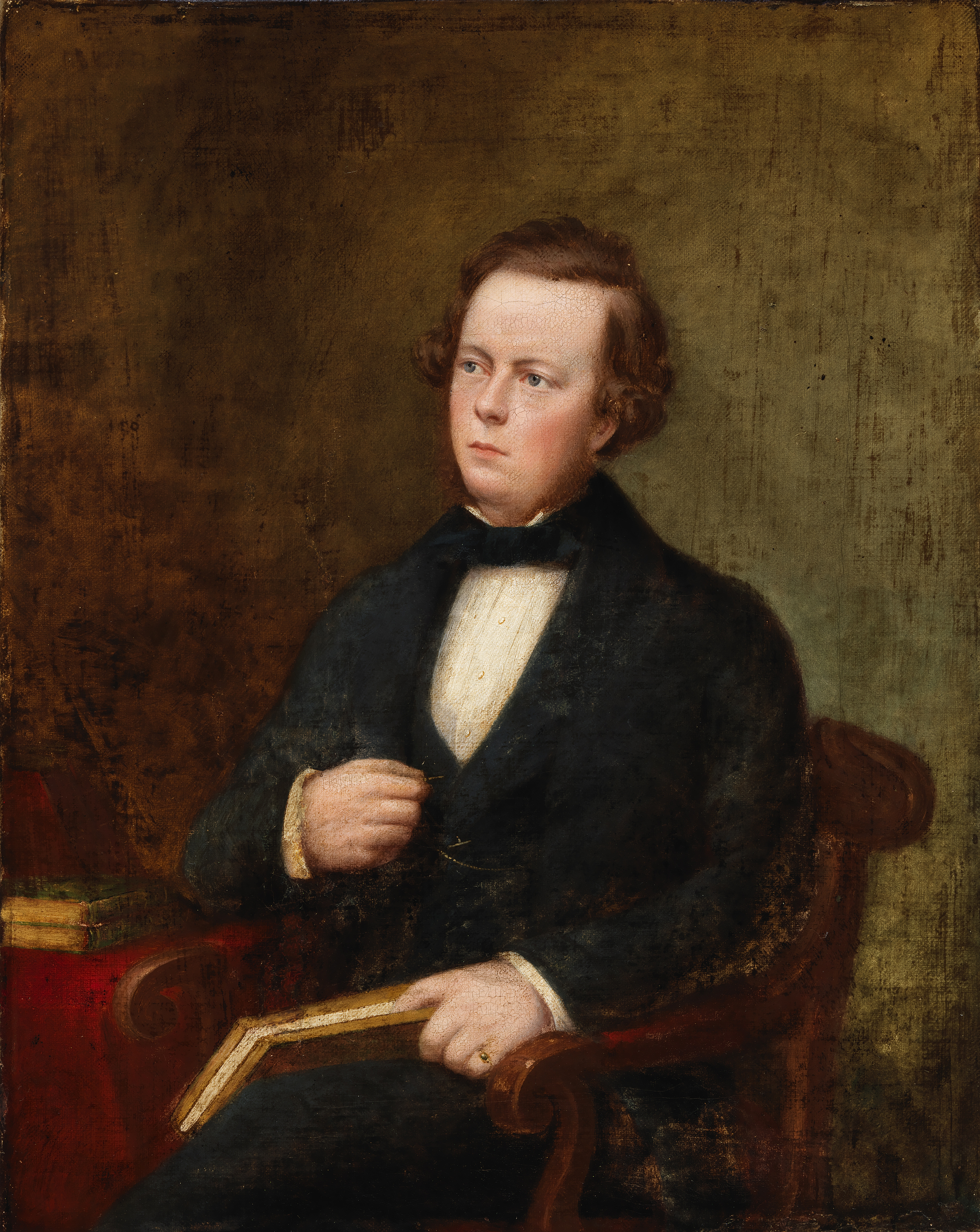
- Born: 26 May 1817; Dublin, Ireland
- Died: 9 April 1882 (aged 64); Dublin, Ireland
- Children: Mary

Denis Florence MacCarthy (26 May 1817 – 9 April 1882) was an Irish poet, translator, and biographer. He is best known for his contributions to translating Spanish literature for the English-speaking world.

== Biography ==
MacCarthy was born in Lower O'Connell Street, Dublin, on 26 May 1817, and educated there and at St Patrick's Pontifical University, Maynooth. He acquired an intimate knowledge of Spanish from a learned priest, who had spent much time in Spain, which he was later to turn to good advantage. In April 1834, before turning seventeen, MacCarthy contributed his first verses to the Dublin Satirist. He was one of a coterie of writers whose works appeared in the Nation, which had been started by Charles Gavan Duffy in 1842. Writing under the pseudonym "Desmond", most of MacCarthy's patriotic verse appeared in this organ.

In 1846, he was called to the Irish bar, but never practised. In the same year he edited The Poets and Dramatists of Ireland, which he prefaced with an essay on the early history and religion of his countrymen. About this time he also edited The Book of Irish Ballads (by various authors), with an introductory essay on ballad poetry in general. His Ballads, Poems, and Lyrics, appeared in 1850, original and translated. His attention was first directed to Pedro Calderón de la Barca by a passage in one of Percy Bysshe Shelley's essays, and from then on the interpretation of the "Spanish Shakespeare" claimed the greater part of his attention.

The first volume of his translations, containing six plays, appeared in 1853, and was followed by further instalments in 1861, 1867, 1870, and 1873. His version of Daybreak in Capacabana was completed only a few months before his death.

Until 1864, he resided principally on Killiney Hill, overlooking Dublin Bay. The delicate health of some members of his family then rendered a change of climate imperative, and he paid a prolonged visit to continental Europe. On his return MacCarthy settled in London, where he published – in addition to his translations – Shelley's Early Life, which contains an account of that poet's visit to Dublin in 1812. MacCarthy had already resettled in his native land of Ireland for some months, when he died on Good Friday, 1882 at Blackrock, Dublin. His poetical gifts were inherited by his daughter, who became a nun, and wrote as Sister Mary Stanislaus.

His poems are distinguished by a sense of harmony and sympathy with natural beauty. Such poems as "The Bridal of the Year," "Summer Longings" (alias "Waiting for the May"), and his long narrative poem, "The Voyage of St. Brendan," are among his most enduring works. The last-mentioned, which paraphrases the "Ave Maria Stella" as the evening song of the sailors, is also marked by the earnest religious feeling which marked its author throughout life. But it is by his version of Calderon that he is considered to have won a permanent place in English letters. His success is sufficiently testified by George Ticknor, who declared in his History of Spanish Literature that MacCarthy "has succeeded in giving a faithful idea of what is grandest and most effective in [Calderon's] genius... to a degree which I had previously thought impossible. Nothing, I think, in the English language will give us so true an impression of what is most characteristic of the Spanish drama, and of Spanish poetry generally."

== Published works ==
Below are lists of his published works, some of which are available on-line at Project Gutenberg (see Online works below).

=== Poetry ===
- Poems Published in Dublin by M. H. Gill and Son in 1882 An extensive collection edited by the poet's son.
- The Book of Irish Ballads Published in Dublin by James Duffy in 1846, revised in 1869.
- Ballads, Poems, and Lyrics, Original and Translated Published in Dublin by James McGlashan in 1850.
- The Bell-Founder, And Other Poems Published in London by David Bogue in 1857.
- Underglimpses, And Other Poems Published in London by David Bogue in 1857.
- Irish Legends And Lyrics Published in Dublin by McGlashan & Gill in 1858.
- Poems of Denis F. McCarthy [sic], with Life and Notes Published in Dublin and Cork by The Educational Company, Ltd., no date.

=== Drama ===
- Dramas of Calderon, Tragic, Comic, and Legendary Published in London by Charles Dolman in 1853. Containing "The Constant Prince" ("El Principe Constante"), "The Secret in Words" ("El Secreto a Voces"), "The Physician of His own Honour" ("El Medico de Su Honra"), "Love after Death" ("Amar despues de la Muerte"), "The Purgatory of Saint Patrick" ("El Purgatorio de San Patricio"), and "The Scarf and the Flower" ("La Banda y la Flor"). Rebound with a foreword in 1886 for the Memorial Fund Committee.
- Love the Greatest Enchantment: The Sorceries of Sin: The Devotion of the Cross Published in London by Longtan, Green, Longman and Roberts in 1861. Containing (with original language texts) "El Mayor Encanto Amor, Los Encantos de la Culpa" (an "Auto Sacramental"), and "La Devocion de la Cruz."
- Mysteries of Corpus Christi Published in Dublin by James Duffy in 1867. Containing "Balshazza's Feast" ("La Cena de Balthasar") and "The Divine Philothea" ("La Divina Filotea"), two "Auto Sacramentales."
- The Two Lovers of Heaven: Chrysanthus and Daria Published in Dublin by John F. Fowler in 1870. Containing Los dos amantes del cielo: Crisanto y Daria.
- Calderon's Dramas Published in London by Henry S. King in 1873. Containing "Life is a Dream" ("La Vida es Sueño"), "The Wonder-Working Magician" ("El Magico Prodigioso"), and a new edition of "The Purgatory of St. Patrick" ("Purgatorio de San Patricio").
- Daybreak at Capacabana (La Aurora en Copacabana) was completed shortly before the translator's death.

=== Biography ===
- The Poets and Dramatists of Ireland Published in Dublin by James Duffy in 1846.
- Shelley's Early Life Published in London by John Camden Hotten in 1872.
