= Brian Glynn (cricketer) =

English cricketer

Personal information
- Full name: Brian Thomas Glynn
- Born: 27 April 1940; Birmingham, Warwickshire, England
- Died: 27 September 2007 (aged 67); England
- Batting: Right-handed
- Bowling: Right-arm off break

Domestic team information
- Years: Team
- 1959–1961: Warwickshire

Career statistics
Competition	First-class
Matches	2
Runs scored	13
Batting average	6.50
100s/50s	–/–
Top score	7
Balls bowled	–
Wickets	–
Bowling average	–
5 wickets in innings	–
10 wickets in match	–
Best bowling	–
Catches/stumpings	–/–
- Source: Cricinfo, 14 July 2012

Brian Thomas Glynn (27 April 1940 – 27 September 2007) was an English cricketer. Glynn was a right-handed batsman who bowled right-arm off break. He was born at Birmingham, Warwickshire.

Glynn made two first-class appearances for Warwickshire, both against Scotland, with one match in 1959 and the other in 1961. In his first match, Scotland won the toss and elected to bat first, making 262 all out. Warwickshire responded in their first-innings by making 180/1 declared. Scotland then made 128/6 declared in their second-innings, leaving Warwickshire with a target of 211 for victory. Warwickshire were dismissed for 157 in their chase, with Glynn ending the innings not out on 6. In his second match, Warwickshire won the toss and elected to field first, with Scotland making 142 all out in their first-innings. Warwickshire then made 180 all out in their first-innings, with Glynn being dismissed for a duck by Jimmy Allan. Scotland then made 346/8 declared in their second-innings, leaving Warwickshire with a target of 309 for victory. Warwickshire narrowly fell short of their target, reaching 298/8, with Glynn scoring 7 runs before he was dismissed by Ronald Chisholm, with the match ending as a draw.

He died on 27 September 2007.
