= Tony Glynn =

Australian missionary

The Reverend Father Tony Glynn SM, AM, MBE, ORS
- Born: 1926; Casino, New South Wales, Australia
- Died: 1 December 1994 (aged 67–68); Nara, Japan
- Relatives: Paul Glynn (brother) John Glynn (brother)
- Awards: Order of Australia, Member of the British Empire, Order of the Rising Sun

Anthony Joachim Glynn (1926–1994) was an Australian Catholic missionary priest in Japan whose work for post-war reconciliation between Australia and Japan earned him imperial and national honors from both countries.

== Early life ==
Glynn was born in Casino, in the Northern Rivers area of New South Wales, Australia in 1926. He was one of eight children of Harold Marcus Glynn, a successful store owner, and Nina Rose Glynn (née Dougherty). Following his mother's death in 1932, when Anthony was six, Nina's sister Molly stepped in to help raise the children. Glynn was attending boarding school in Sydney at St Joseph's College, Hunters Hill when the British colony of Singapore fell to the Imperial Japanese Army in 1942. Due to widespread fear of a possible Japanese invasion of Australia, he and his younger brother Paul Glynn were called back to Lismore to finish their schooling at St John's College, Woodlawn.

== Religious vocation ==
The Glynns were a devout Roman Catholic family of Irish immigrant heritage. Three of the boys, John, Tony and Paul, trained for the priesthood at the Toongabbie (Sydney) seminary of the Society of Mary or Marist order. While studying at Toongabbie in 1946 Glynn met Fr Lionel Marsden who, while serving as a chaplain in the 8th Division Australian Imperial Force (AIF), became a prisoner-of-war and was put to work on the notorious Thai-Burma Railway. The newly-ordained Fr Tony Glynn was accepted for the Japanese mission in January 1952.

After arriving at the Marist headquarters in Kyoto, Glynn studied the Japanese language. His early pastoral duties included ministering to the sick at a leprosarium near Tokyo. In 1953 Glynn was appointed to a parish in the city of Nara. He visited both the sick and prisoners, taught Bible studies, ran youth groups, and organised aid deliveries from abroad. During his career, he delivered more than 150,000 items, such as winter clothing, to the poor. In this last endeavour, he was assisted by his brother and fellow Marist priest Fr John Glynn, editor of magazine The Harvest, which publicized the order's overseas missions. Glynn also made a point of forging close ties with members of the Buddhist and Shinto faiths, and would eventually lead seven pioneering Buddhist/Christian prayer pilgrimages to Pacific War sites, from Lae, in Papua New Guinea, to Nagasaki.

In May 1956, Glynn received a telephone call from the American actor Glenn Ford, who was in Japan filming The Teahouse of the August Moon. Another member of the cast, Louis Calhern, had died following a heart attack, and Ford and fellow actor Marlon Brando arranged for his funeral to be conducted at Glynn's church.

Father Glynn was temporarily posted back to Australia in 1957. When news circulated of his impending departure, he was showered with gifts by parishioners, community organizations, and local dignitaries grateful for his services to the people of Nara. This gave him the idea of making a public exhibition of the gifts, which included many valuable works of art. Back in Sydney, he approached several potential venues, but none would accept the proposal. One store executive commented that ill-feeling towards the Japanese was so great "we couldn't guarantee safety". An appeal for help to Prime Minister Robert Menzies led to Mark Foy's department store making space, and Menzies took time out to open the exhibition in August 1958. The cultural display toured more than 40 cities and towns in Australia and New Zealand.

The publicity generated by the exhibition allowed the priest to spread a message of reconciliation. Some war veterans remained hostile, but others responded by coming forward with traditional Japanese swords they had picked up on battlefields in the Pacific or confiscated from surrendering Japanese soldiers. Father Glynn undertook to return them to the families of their owners in Japan, and for this purpose collected around 80 swords during his lifetime.

On his return to Japan in 1959, Glynn took up the cause of mixed-race children who had been left behind in the city of Kure where the British Commonwealth Occupation Force was based between 1946 and 1952. A welfare agency identified around 100 children—many fathered by Australian servicemen—who were in desperate need due to poverty and social prejudice. The priest advocated for their adoption and entry into Australia, but government officials refused to grant an exception to the White Australia policy. Glynn campaigned to raise money to provide living allowances and pay for the education of the children in Japan.

== Honours ==
For the last 26 years of his life, Father Glynn was the pastor of Tomigaoka, a new suburb on the outskirts of Nara. He raised more than US$1 million to build a new church, convent, and kindergarten, in the process winning many admirers across a variety of demographics. He drew many Japanese citizens to the Catholic faith in a country where Christians represent less than 1% of the population. In the 1964 New Year's Honours List he was named a Member of the Order of the British Empire (MBE). He was made a Member of the Order of Australia (AM) in 1982 and also received the Order of the Rising Sun from the Japanese Emperor in 1985.

== Death ==
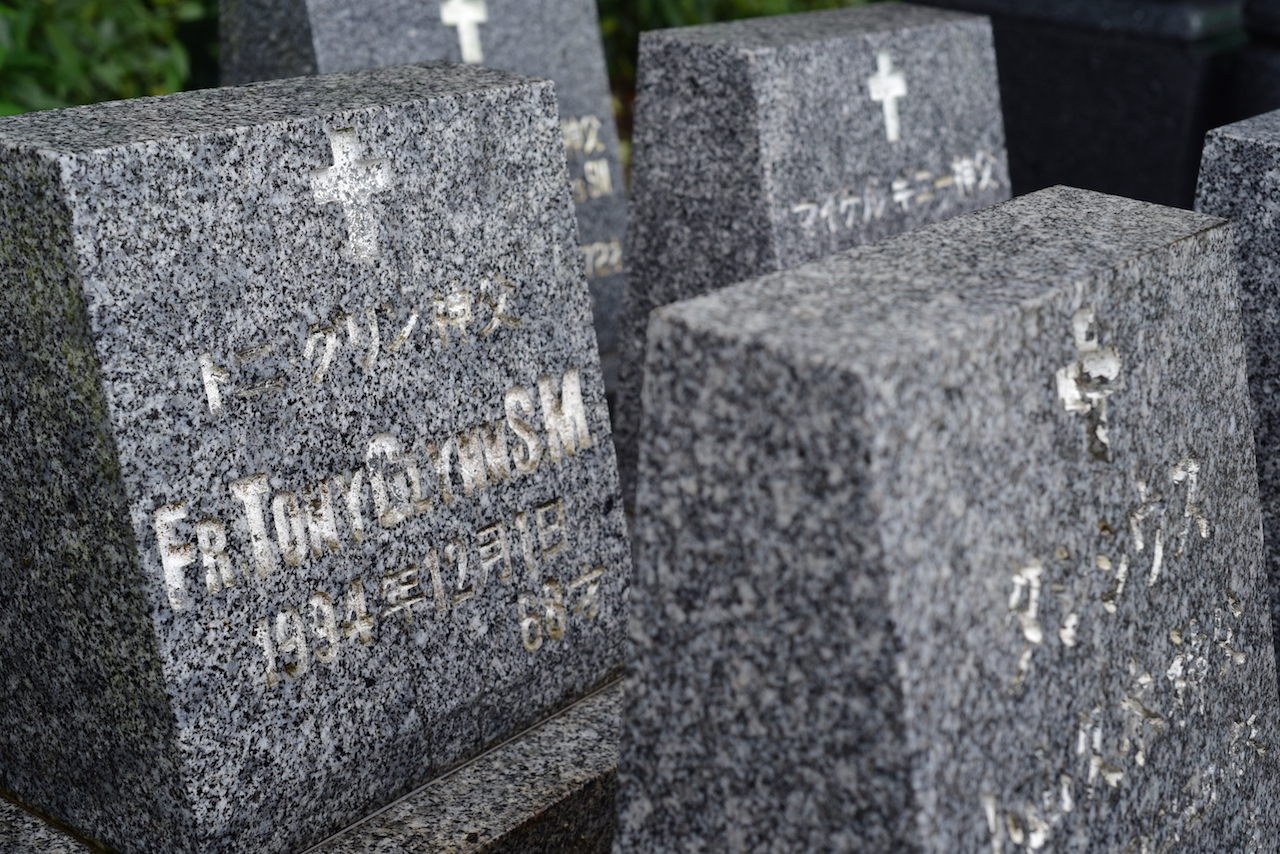
Father Tony Glynn's Grave in Nara

In 1982, Father Glynn was diagnosed with cancer, leading to a series of operations over the following decade. Concerned that if he went back to Australia for treatment he would never be able to return to Japan, he resolved to keep working in his parish at Tomigaoka until his death. In the last weeks of his life, he was made an honorary citizen of Nara. He died on 1 December 1994. An estimated 5,000 mourners attended the wake and funeral mass.

John Menadue, a former Ambassador to Japan, commented: "In his very direct way, Tony focused on the power of symbols and used them more effectively than any other person. He was the first to see a means to meet the need for reconciliation and forgiveness after the bitter war years and he became the heart and soul of it". Another friend, the author Morris West, said: "He believed what he taught [as a Marist missionary] and taught by his own example the essential message of the Gospel: reconciliation and love". Fr Paul Glynn, who has likewise been honoured for his achievements as a missionary and author, recalled: "Tony told me there is no cheap grace. We must struggle and sometimes suffer if we and others are to experience Christ's grace in ourselves and in those for whom we are responsible."

== Legacy ==
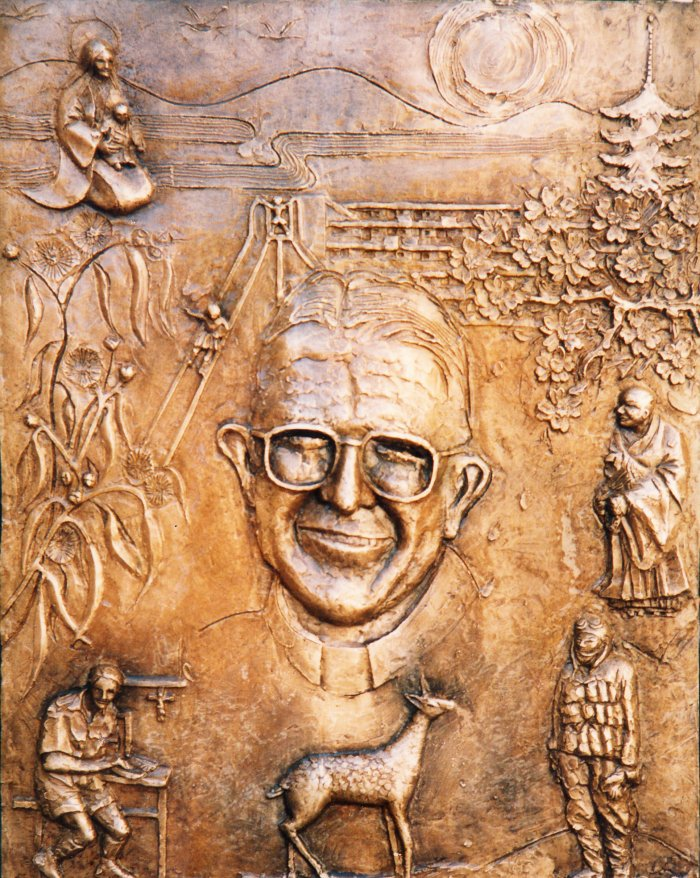
The Father Tony Glynn Memorial Plaque at the Australian World Peace Bell in Cowra NSW

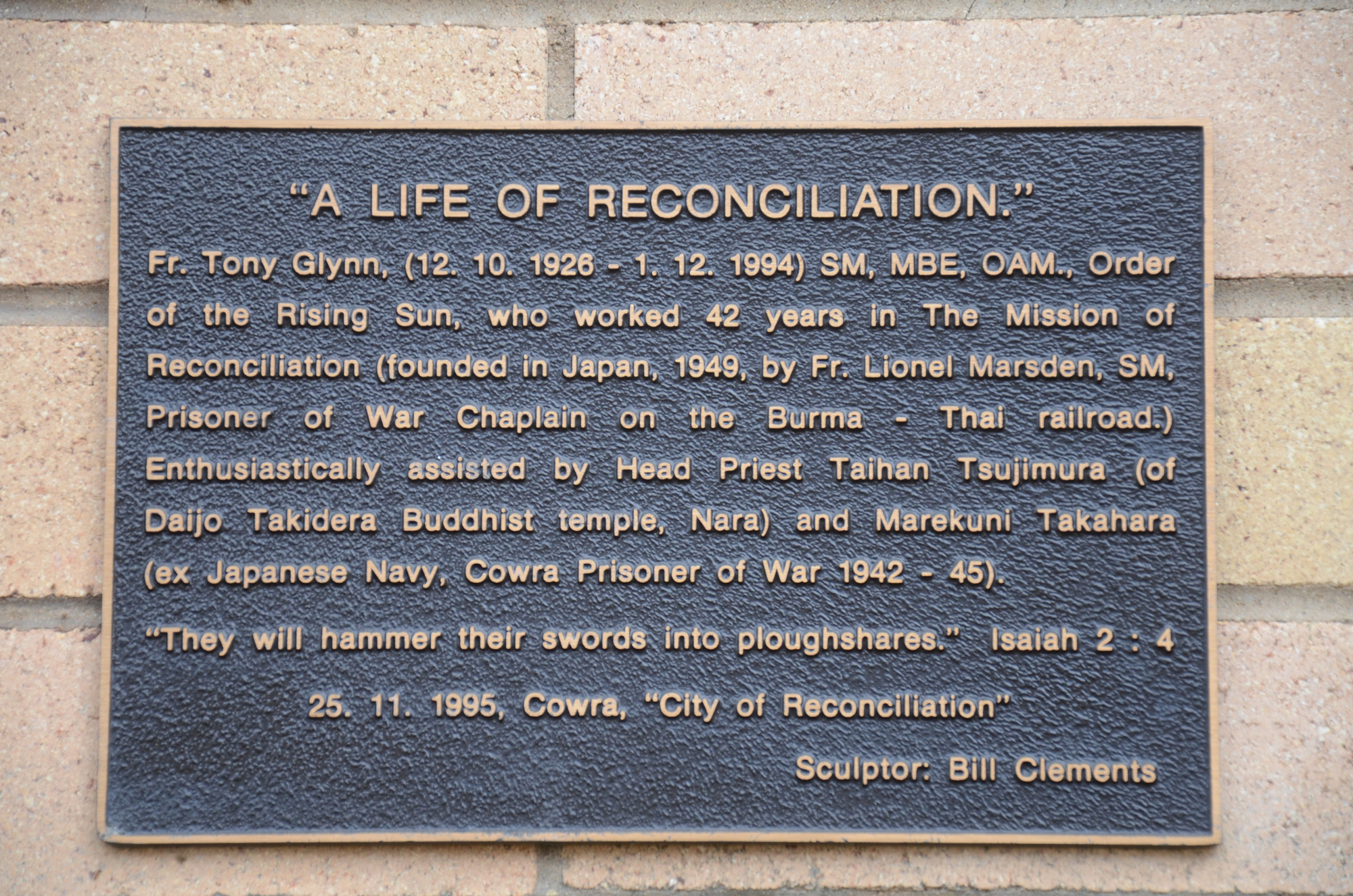
Plaque text

Glynn has been the subject of two biographies: Shimpu-san: Healer of Hate by Jim Brigginshaw (1996) and "Like a Samurai": The Tony Glynn Story by Paul Glynn (2008). He was featured in a Japanese film documentary The Railroad of Love (1999) made by director Shigeki Chiba. His name was given to the Tony Glynn Australia-Japan Centre at the Lismore campus of Southern Cross University, which was dedicated in 2004. His image is preserved in a bronze plaque erected at Cowra, a city in country New South Wales that maintains close relations with Japan.
