= Arland Ussher =

Percival Arland Ussher (9 September 1899 – 24 December 1980) was an Anglo-Irish academic, essayist and translator.

Ussher was born in Battersea, London, the only child of Emily Jebb (born on the Lyth estate, Ellesmere, Shropshire in 1872) and Beverley Grant Ussher, who was Irish. The Jebbs were a wealthy and influential family of reformers. Ussher's grandmother Eglantyne Louisa Jebb founded the Home Arts and Industries Association, his aunt Eglantyne Jebb founded Save the Children, and another aunt, Dorothy Jebb Buxton, was a humanitarian.

Beverley Ussher worked as a schools inspector for the Board of Education in England. The family lived in England until he retired in 1914, and they then moved to Ireland and lived at Cappagh House in Dungarvan, County Waterford. Emily Ussher tried to draw attention to the atrocities being committed by the Black and Tans.

Ussher studied at the University of Cambridge. In 1926 he published a translation of The Midnight Court (Cúirt an Mheán-Oíche) by the Irish-language poet Brian Merriman. Ussher also published The Face and Mind of Ireland (1949) and Three Great Irishmen (1952), a comparative study of Bernard Shaw, W.B. Yeats and James Joyce. He also wrote Journey Through Dread. Ussher moved to County Waterford to manage the family's farm before moving to Dublin in 1953.
