= The Klaxon.com =

Online news organisation

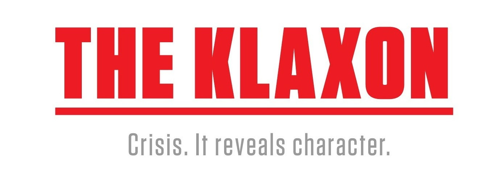
- Company type: Private
- Website type: News & blog
- Available in: English
- Founded: December 2009
- Headquarters: New York City, {{{location_country}}}
- Owners: Joshua Wilwohl; Chuck Frank
- Founders: Joshua Wilwohl; Chuck Frank
- Key people: Joshua Wilwohl, editor-in-chief Chuck Frank, publisher
- Employees: 20
- Registration: Optional
- Launched: December 1, 2009
- Current status: Inactive

The Klaxon.com was an online news organization that offered commentary and analysis on emergencies and disasters around the world. It was founded on December 1, 2009 by Joshua Wilwohl, who was also editor-in-chief, and Chuck Frank, who was publisher. Wilwohl was undertaking his master's degree at the Metropolitan College of New York at the time, and the blog began as a thesis.

It was unique not only for its content, but also because it was operated completely on handheld devices, such as the iPhone and BlackBerry, by staff anywhere in the world. It was co-founded in 2009 by Joshua Wilwohl and Chuck Frank.

Two articles about domestic terrorism in the United States were published by investigative journalist Steven Emerson, one in December 2009, and January 2010. The Klaxon.com does not appear to be cited nor mentioned anywhere beyond 2010.

Wilwohl also wrote articles for Patch.com and was editor of West Orange Patch. He authored a book called All the News That Fits in Your Pocket, and later taught at his alma mater, the Metropolitan College of New York. As of August 2025 he is Assistant Professor, General Education, at the American University of Phnom Penh in Phnom Penh, Cambodia, while he undertakes a doctorate there.
