= Con Leventhal =

Irish lecturer, essayist, and critic

- Born: Abraham Jacob Leventhal; 9 May 1896; Lower Clanbrassil Street, Dublin, Ireland
- Died: 3 October 1979 (aged 83); Paris, France

A.J. Con Leventhal (9 May 1896 – 3 October 1979) was an Irish lecturer, essayist, and critic.

== Early life and education ==
Leventhal was born Abraham Jacob Leventhal in Lower Clanbrassil Street, Dublin on 9 May 1896. His parents were Rosa (née Levenberg) and Moses (Maurice) Leventhal. His father was a draper, and his mother was a poet. She was a Zionist, who was a founding member of the Women's Zionist Society. He lived in the "Little Jerusalem" of Dublin, the area around the South Circular Road, in his youth. He attended Wesley College, Dublin, and then Trinity College Dublin (TCD) to study modern languages. He edited the TCD student magazine in 1918. It was in TCD that he acquired the nickname "Con," an allusion to his father's job as a "Continental" agent. He joined the first Zionist commission and travelled to Palestine after World War I, and helped to found the newspaper, Palestine Weekly. He was then invited to join the Jewish National Fund's London office, and began working on the Zionist Review. He returned to Dublin to complete his degree in 1920, and in 1921 travelled to Paris where he met James Joyce.

Leventhal married Gertrude Zlotover in October 1922. He worked with his father-in-law, Joseph Zlotover, at the family furniture business on Mary Street for a time. After, he started a number of unsuccessful businesses of his own, including the Irish Book Shop on Dawson Street from 1924 to 1925. It was possibly his business failures that inspired the idea of the TCD Students Appointment Association, which would give students pragmatic business skills. TCD accepted this proposal and employed him as the first administrator.

== Career ==
He completed a PhD in contemporary French literature, and in 1932 was appointed to the staff of the French department at TCD. He replaced his friend Samuel Beckett. During his time in TCD, he was an assistant editor to Hermathena, to which he also contributed his translations of French poetry. Leventhal was associated with a number of progressive cultural movements in Dublin of the 1920s and 1930s. He was a regular attendee at meetings held to promote Jewish culture and nationalism, and lectured this group on Joyce. Through his interest in Joyce, he became an associate of Seumas O'Sullivan, and The Dublin Magazine. When the printers refused to set his review of Ulysses in 1923 for The Dublin Magazine, Leventhal was moved to found his own magazine in response to the censorship, The Klaxon. The only issue of the magazine published a shortened version of the review under the pseudonym "Lawrence K. Emery". He was also associated with Francis Stuart's Tomorrow magazine. He was also interested in drama, and was a member of the avant-garde Dublin Drama League, occasionally performing with them. Among his close friends were Madam Bannard Cogley, Micheál Mac Liammóir, and Lennox Robinson. From 1943 to 1958 his column, "Dramatic commentary", was published in The Dublin Magazine. He was also published in The Irish Times, The Irish Press, The Listener, Westminster Weekly, Financial Times, and International Herald Tribune. He was a regular contributor to Radio Éireann and BBC broadcasts.

He began a long-term relationship with Ethna MacCarthy, marrying her after the death of his first wife in 1956. MacCarthy died in 1959. He retired from TCD in 1963, and moved to Paris, where he became Beckett's literary assistant. He lived on Boulevard Montparnasse with his partner Marion Leigh. He died of cancer in Paris in 1979. There are two known portraits of Leventhal, one by John Russell (1920) and a second by Avigdor Arikha. The Leventhal Scholarship at TCD was founded in his memory. TCD and the Harry Ransom Center hold papers relating to Leventhal.
