= Bill Glynn (entrepreneur) =

American entrepreneur (born 1968)

Bill Glynn (born 1968) is an American entrepreneur. In 2001, Information Week named him as one of "fifteen thought leaders who intend to influence and inspire the IT industry".

Glynn is the founder of Collective IQ, a venture capital platform. He has a successful investment track record and has helped close over $1 billion for the funds and businesses he has founded, helped build and advised. He advises leaders of London's Royal Institution World Science Assembly and the East-West Institute where he is focused on "Harmonizing Humanity" and the "Weaponization of Science".

== Book ==
- Left on Red : How to Ignite, Leverage, and Build Visionary Organizations, Wiley (2008) ISBN 0-470-23023-1
