= Bill Glynn (footballer) =

Australian rules footballer, born 1900

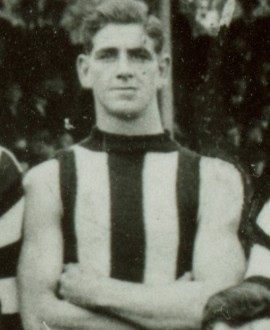
- Glynn in 1922

Personal information
- Full name: William Patrick Glynn
- Born: 9 July 1900; Fairfield, Victoria
- Died: 14 April 1978 (aged 77); Frankston, Victoria
- Original team: Kew
- Height: 185 cm (6 ft 1 in)
- Weight: 85 kg (187 lb)

Playing career^{1}
Years	Club	Games (Goals)
1922–23	Collingwood	9 (4)
- ^{1} Playing statistics correct to the end of 1923.

William Patrick Glynn (9 July 1900 – 14 April 1978) was an Australian rules footballer who played with Collingwood in the Victorian Football League (VFL).
