= William Glynn (cricketer) =

Australian cricketer (1846–1895)

Personal information
- Born: 1846
- Died: 18 June 1895 (aged 48–49); Melbourne, Australia

Domestic team information
- Years: Team
- 1870: Tasmania
- Source: Cricinfo, 12 January 2016

William Glynn (1846 – 18 June 1895) was an Australian cricketer. He played one first-class match for Tasmania in 1870.

== See also ==
- List of Tasmanian representative cricketers
