= William Burns Glynn =

William Burns Glynn (1923, Manchester – 24 February 2014, Lima) was a British engineer and researcher of the Pre-Columbian era in Peru, noted for his work investigating possible Pre-Columbian writing.

From a young age he was interested in mathematics, as well as French, Latin and ancient Greek. Apart from studying his mother tongue English, he also studied and he spoke Quechua and Spanish. He was Honorary President of the Greater Academy of the Quechua Language, Cusco, Peru.

During World War II he was a communications expert in the Royal Signal Corps and participated in the invasion of Europe. He also provided important services in Lebanon and Palestine.

He worked professionally in India. He arrived in Peru in 1956 and became fascinated by the country, interested in the dazzling textile art of the ancient Peruvians and in the Quipus.

Inspired by this interest, Burns looked for an Inca writing system and in 1979 published his first work, titled Secret Writings of the Incas (also Decodificación de quipus), where he suggests that the pre-Hispanic Incas were in fact literate. He would go on to write 3 more books; Legado de los Amautas, La escritura de los Incas: une introducción a la clave de la escritura secreta de los Incas, and El mundo de los amautas

In 1990 CONCYTEC (the Peruvian National Council of Science and Technology) published all of Burns' works. He died in Lima, Peru, on 24 February 2014.
