= Pádraig Mag Fhloinn =

Irish Scribe

Pádraig Mag Fhloinn (Pat Glynn, fl. 1828–1835) was an Irish scribe.

Mag Fhloinn's manuscripts, featuring folksongs, are kept in the Royal Irish Academy in Dawson Street, Dublin. One of his last known autographs state that:

Pat Glynn most respectfully begs leave to inform the public, particularly those who are admirers of ancient Irish literature that he will shortly publish a copious English Irish Dictionary in which will be found upwards of 100,000 words which have never been published in any dictionary of our vernacular Language. To subscribers 10.s only.

== See also ==
- Glynn (disambiguation)
