= Seán Mag Fhloinn =

Irish scribe

Seán Mag Fhloinn (fl. 1843–1915) was an Irish scribe.

Mag Fhloinn was a native of Cummer, County Galway. His transcriptions included songs attributed to Antoine Ó Raifteirí, poems by Thomas Moore, and grammar.
