= Leitrim (Counties Galway and Clare barony) =

Barony (land division) in western Ireland

Leitrim Liatroim (Irish)
- Barony
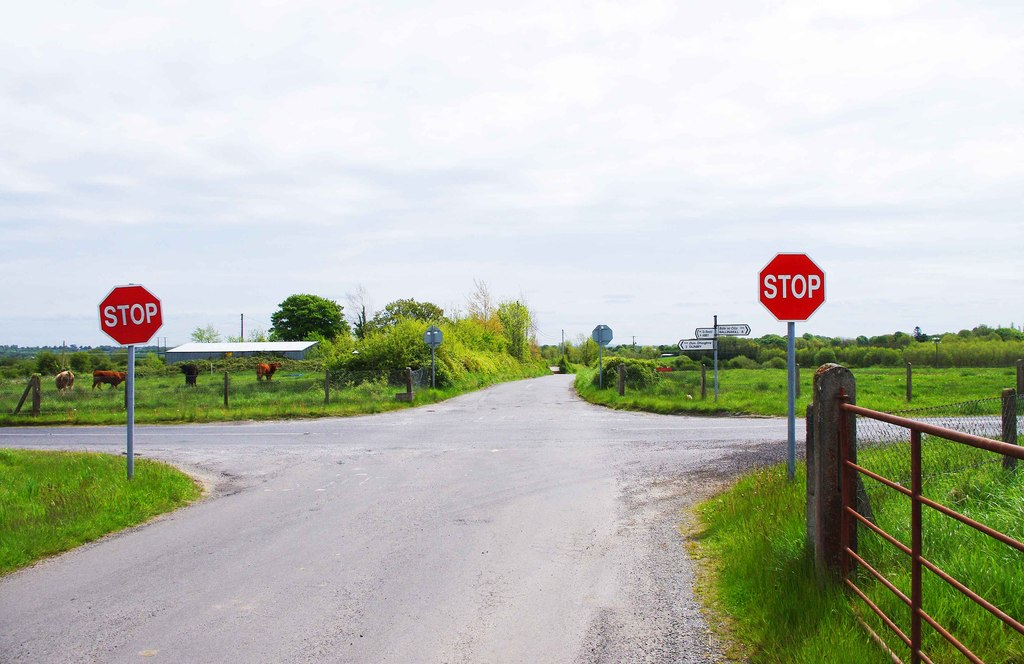
- Crossroads near Duniry

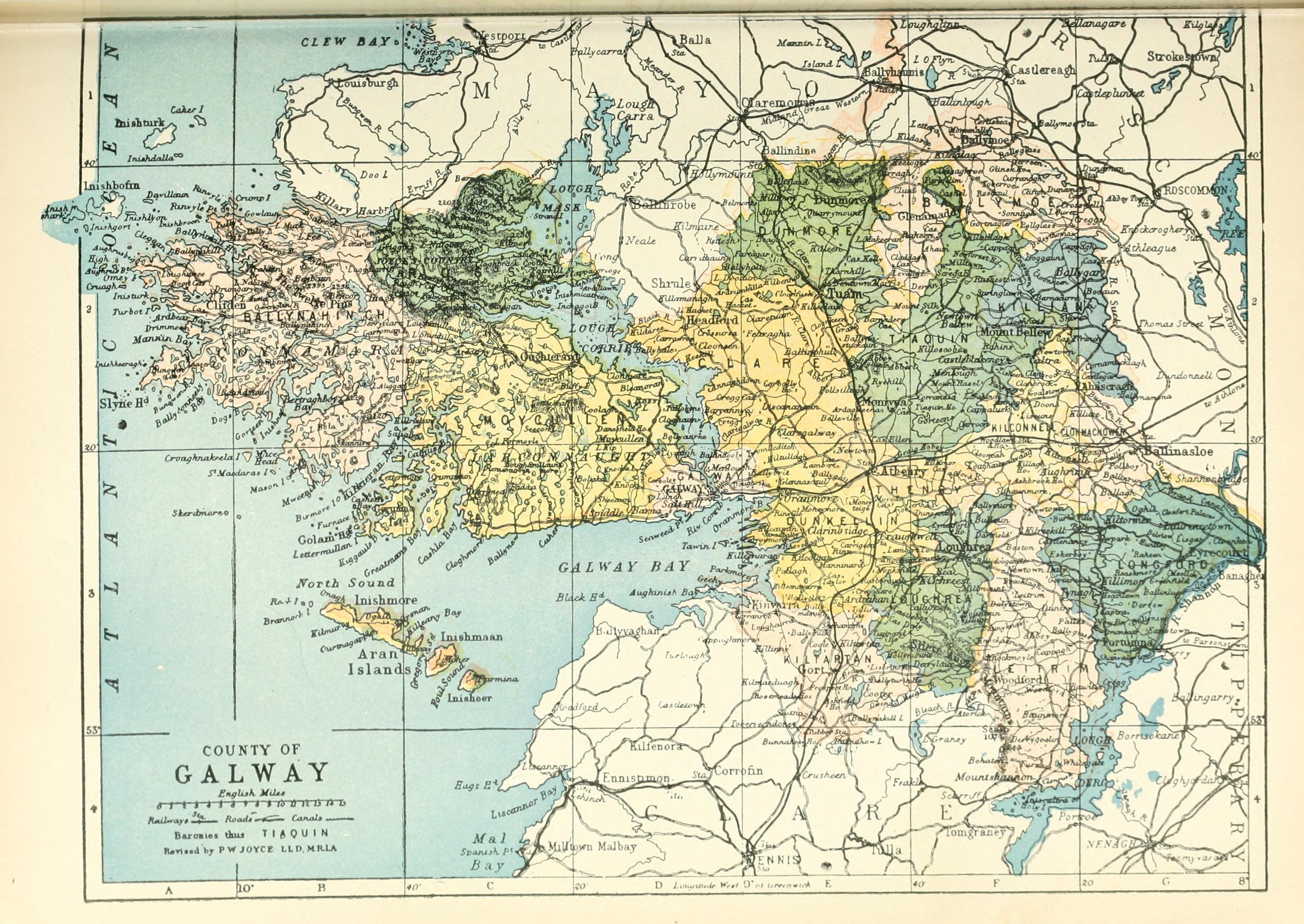
- Barony map of County Galway, 1900; Leitrim is in the south, coloured pink.

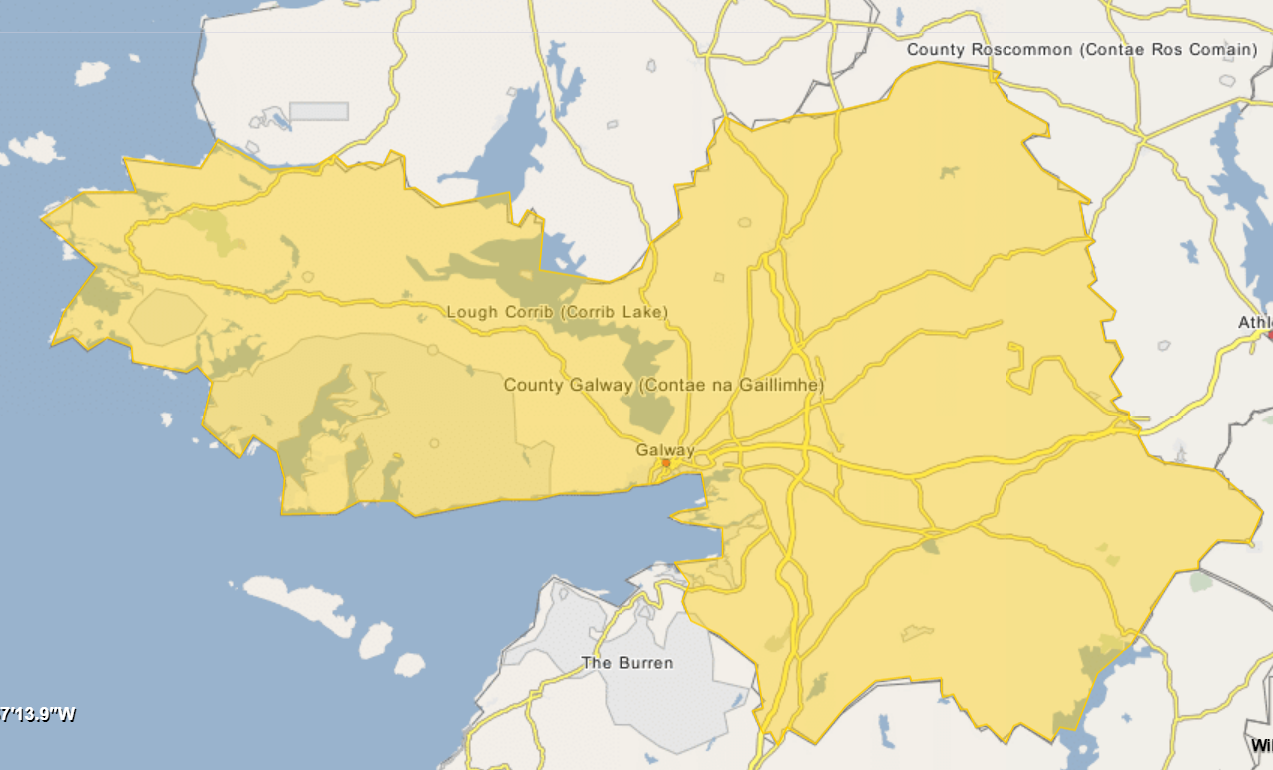
- Location within County Galway
- Coordinates: 53°07′N 8°26′W
- Sovereign state: Ireland
- Province: Connacht; Munster
- County: Clare; Galway

Area
  - Total: 443.4 km^{2} (171.2 sq mi)

Leitrim (Irish: Liatroim; /ˈliːtrəm/ LEE-trəm) is a historical barony in Ireland that lies partly in County Galway and partly in County Clare. It is located in the south-eastern corner of County Galway and the north-eastern corner of County Clare. Prior to 1898, the entire barony was contained in County Galway. The Local Government (Ireland) Act 1898 split the barony: part of the barony was transferred to County Clare. Leitrim is bounded, clockwise from the southwest, by the Clare baronies of Tulla Upper and Tulla Lower; the Galway baronies of Loughrea to the west, Kilconnell to the north, and Longford to the east; and by Lough Derg to the south and southeast. It measures 20 miles (32 km) from north to south and 9.5 miles (15.3 km) from east to west.

== Geography ==
The highest peak in the barony is the Scalp (380m), part of the Slieve Aughty range. Lough Derg forms the barony's eastern boundary. Three rivers flow in an easterly direction to the Lough; from north to south they are the Cappagh, the Woodford, and the Coos. The mines at Tynagh were a source of lead and zinc from the 1960s until their closure in 1981.

The R353 regional road bisects the barony from east to west. At the northern end is the N65 national road.

Settlements in the barony include Caherakilleen, Kilreekill, Tynagh and Woodford in Galway, and Mountshannon and Whitegate in Clare.

=== Civil parishes ===
There are 12 civil parishes in the barony. Ten are in County Galway:

- Ballynakill
- Kilcooly
- Kilmeen (Also partly in the barony of Loughrea)
- Killoran (Also partly in the baronies of Clonmacnowen and Longford)
- Kilreekill
- Kilteskill
- Duniry (Also partly in the barony of Longford)
- Leitrim
- Abbeygormacan
- Tynagh

Three since 1898 have been in County Clare:

- Clonrush
- Kilbarron which consists of a single townland, the island of Illaunmore in Lough Derg, which was transferred from the barony of Ormond Lower in County Tipperary.
- Inishcaltra (partly also in Tulla Upper)
