= Flagmount =

Flagmount can refer to two places in Ireland:

- Flagmount, County Kilkenny, a village in County Kilkenny
- Flagmount, County Clare, a village in Killanena, County Clare
