= Killanena =

Killanena Cill an Aonaigh
- Townland
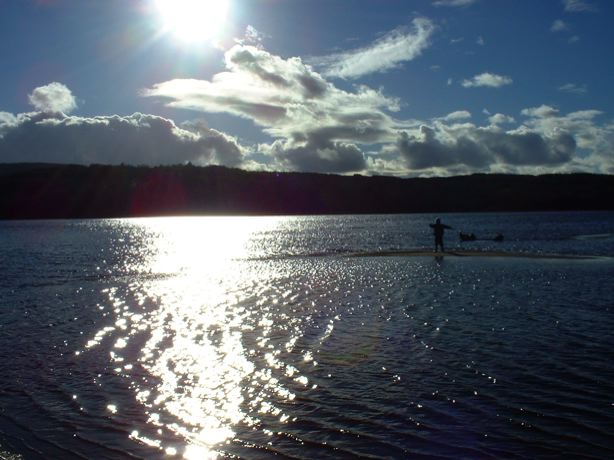
- Lough Graney from Black Island

- Location in Ireland
- Coordinates: 52°58′59″N 8°42′16″W
- Country: Ireland
- Province: Munster
- County: County Clare
- Time zone: UTC+0 (WET)
  - Summer (DST): UTC-1 (IST (WEST))
- Irish Grid Reference: R258774

Killanena (Irish: Cill an Aonaigh, meaning 'church of the fair') is a townland and formerly a district electoral division (DED) in County Clare, Ireland, in the Catholic parish of Killanena.

== Location ==
Killanena lies beside Lough Graney, which covers about 1,000 acres (400 ha). At 5 by .5 kilometres (3.11 by 0.31 mi) it is the largest lake in East Clare after Lough Derg. The lake is well known for its coarse fishery, with pike, perch, bream, rudd and eel. The lake is the home or resting place for water-fowl and wading birds that include whooper swan, great crested grebe, grey heron and greater white-fronted goose. The village of Flagmount overlooks the lake. It is called Leacain an Éadain in Irish, or "the slope of the (hill)brow". The poet Brian Merriman was a local hedge-school master. There is a commemorative stone to him at Bunshoon Bridge between Flagmount and Caher.

== Townlands ==
As of 1901 the Killanena DED included the townlands of Acres, Corbehagh, Derreendooagh, Derrycarran, Derryfadda, Derrynaveagh, Dooglaun, Doorus East, Doorus West, Gortaveha, Gortnamuinga, Islandmore, Killanena, Knockanena, Knockatunna, Knocknageeha, Knocknahannee, Lannaght, Pollaghanumera, Reanahumana, Scalp and Spaightspark.

== Parish ==
A 1942 description of the parish of Killanena placed it in the Tulla barony adjoining the parish of Feakle and about 10 miles (16 km) from Gort. There was no village, but about four shops. Although it did not have electricity, gas or public water or sewage supply at the time, it had plentiful fine wells. The parish of Killanena is in the Roman Catholic Diocese of Killaloe. There are two parish churches, St Mary's in Flagmount and St Mary's in Killanena.
