= Tulla Upper =

- Location within Ireland
- Coordinates: 52.944087°N 8.603089°W
- Country: Ireland
- Province: Munster
- County: Clare

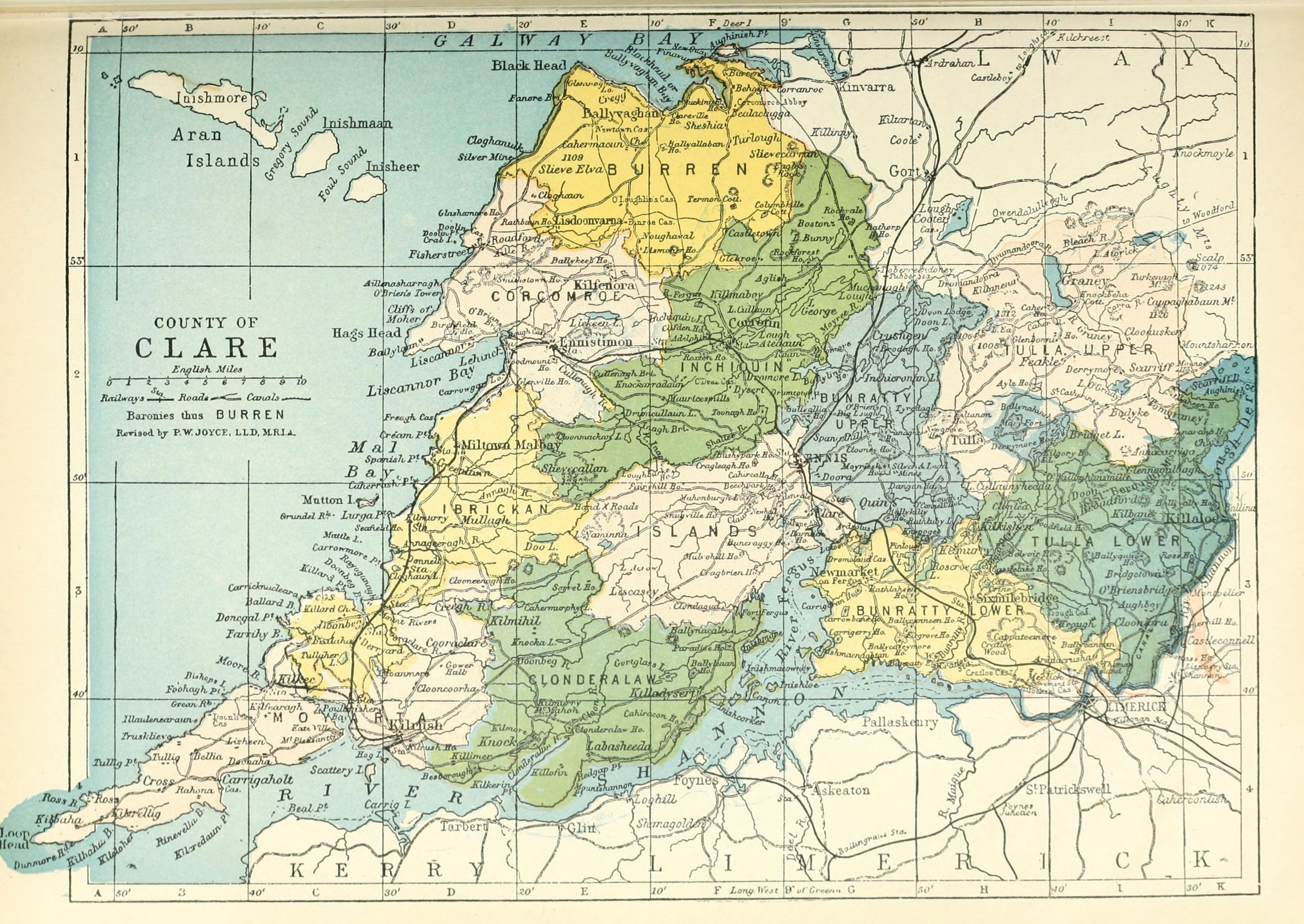
Baronies of Clare. Tulla Upper is in the north-east. The map was drawn prior to the transfer of two parishes from the neighbouring barony of Leitrim. They added to the lakesside territory around Scariff Bay.

Tulla Upper (or Tullagh Upper) is a barony in County Clare, Ireland. This ancient geographical division of land is in turn divided into seven civil parishes.

== Legal context ==
Baronies were created after the Norman invasion of Ireland as divisions of counties and were used the administration of justice and the raising of revenue. While baronies continue to be officially defined units, they have been administratively obsolete since 1898. However, they continue to be used in land registration and in specification, such as in planning permissions. In many cases, a barony corresponds to an earlier Gaelic túath which had submitted to the Crown.

== Location ==
Tulla Upper lies in the north-east of County Clare.

It is bounded to the north-west, north and north-east by the county of Galway. Lough Derg separates it from the county of Tipperary. Within the county of Clare, it is bounded by the baronies of Tulla Lower (to the south and south-west) and by Bunratty Upper (to the west).

== Terrain ==
The barony covers 96,730 acres (39,150 ha) of which 2,911 acres (1,178 ha) are water. The land is mostly moorish upland, with peaks rising to 1,312 feet (400 m) in the north. It includes the Scarriff bay of Lough Derg, and loughs O’Grady, Bridget, Anilloon, Kilgory, Culausheeda, Ea, and Graney.

== Parishes and settlements ==
Until 1898 the parishes of Clonrush and most of Inishcaltra were in the barony of Leitrim in County Galway. That year they were transferred to Tulla Upper and County Clare. The barony contains the parishes of Clonrush, Feakle, Kilnoe, Moynoe, Tomgraney and Tulla and Inishcaltra. The main villages are Scarriff, Tulla, Tomgraney, Feakle and Baurroe.
