= Bodyke =

Village in County Clare, Ireland

Bodyke Lúbán Díge
- Village
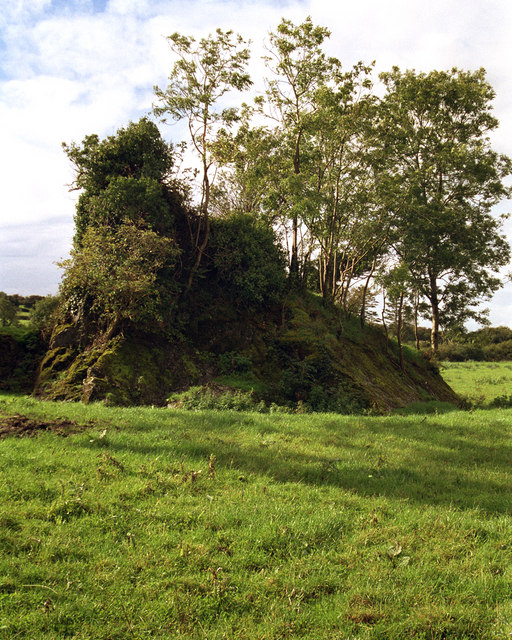
- The ruins of Caherhurley Castle, near Bodyke

- Location within Ireland
- Coordinates: 52°53′02″N 8°35′59″W
- Country: Ireland
- Province: Munster
- County: County Clare
- Time zone: UTC+0 (WET)
  - Summer (DST): UTC-1 (IST (WEST))

Bodyke (/ˈboʊdaɪk/; Irish: Lúbán Díge) is a village in County Clare, Ireland. It is located in eastern County Clare in the Catholic parish of Bodyke. During the 1880s, a series of evictions in the Bodyke area were widely publicised.

== Location and etymology ==
The village of Bodyke lies in the foothills of the Slieve Aughty mountains. According to the antiquarian Thomas Johnson Westropp, the name of the village may come from the Irish Both-Teig, meaning "Teig's hut".

== History ==
=== Built heritage ===
Evidence of ancient settlement in the Bodyke area includes a number of ringfort, enclosure and tower house sites in the townlands of Ballydonaghan, Caherhurly, Coolready and Coolreagh More.

The local Catholic church, the Church of Our Lady of the Assumption, was built in 1844. The nearby parochial house also dates to the 1840s.

=== Bodyke evictions ===
During the 1880s, the principal landowner in the Bodyke area, John O'Callaghan-Westropp (Colonel O'Callaghan), had refused to lower the rents he charged his tenants. They were in distress, and a demonstration was held by the Land League in Scarriff in November 1880 which attracted over 10,000 people. The clergy of the local areas featured prominently at this event, including Fr. Peter Murphy and J. Hannon who were the parish priest and curate for the Tuamgraney/Bodyke area.

The events of 1 June 1881 are known locally as "The Battle of Bodyke". Colonel O'Callaghan, accompanied by a force of approximately 150 police, arrived in Bodyke to serve writs upon 26 tenants for non-payment of rents. The tenants of Bodyke were forewarned of this, and by the time O'Callaghan and his party reached the area, a large crowd had gathered to protest against the evictions. Fr. Murphy arrived at the scene and found "the police with their bayonets fixed presented at the breasts of the people, who stood in a dense mass before them, armed with pronged forks, clubs, and sticks". Fr. Murphy succeeded in defusing the tension between the parties by "having to take the bayonets of the police in my hands and the muzzles of the guns and turn them towards the ground to make room to stand between them in order to separate them and the people". Fr. Murphy also reportedly "induced the people to give of their [weapons]".

Peace lasted for two hours until the county inspector arrived and ordered his men to "charge and cut right and left". Fr. Murphy noted that at this time "the people being quite peaceful and orderly and quiet at the time, and merely laughing at the horses of the police being stung by the bees". The police proceeded to attack the people of the assembly. It is in this initial attack that John Moloney of Caherhurley was struck in the head with the butt of a policeman's rifle and died. Gunfire then ensued from both sides, though no others were killed. The police then handcuffed 22 unarmed members of the public together in a group and led them around as protection as they proceed to serve the remaining writs throughout the area.

In June 1887, O'Callaghan called for police assistance in evicting the tenants, who resisted by force, witnessed by large crowds. Thirty-five of his tenants returned to their homes after being evicted. Twenty-six people, all but four of them women, were charged with assaulting and obstructing the forces of the law, with sentences ranging from acquittal to three months hard labour. The prolonged affair was widely reported and caused angry debates in Parliament. As one member said, "The name of Bodyke stank in the nostrils of the Government..." The evictions continued into the 1890s, with goods and livestock seized in lieu of rent. Often the livestock died of poisoning soon after.

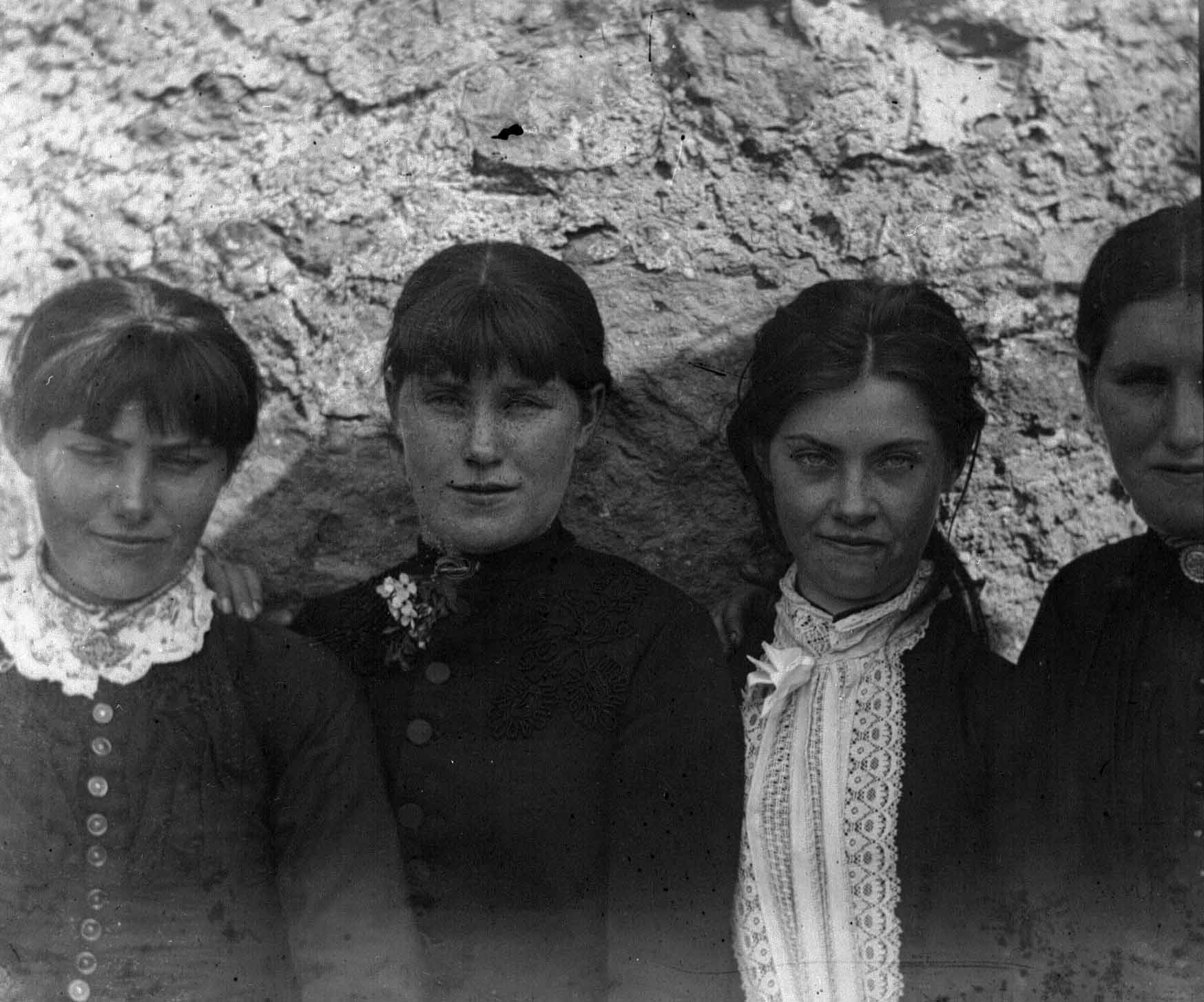
The O'Halloran girls, c. 1888–90

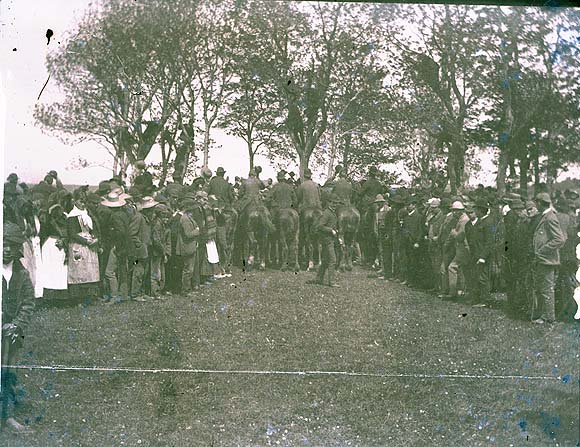
Suppressed meeting, Bodyke, c. 1888–90

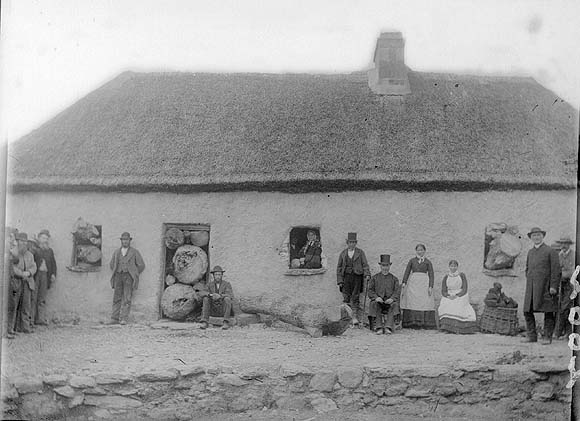
Widow Macnamara in her fortress, c. 1888–90

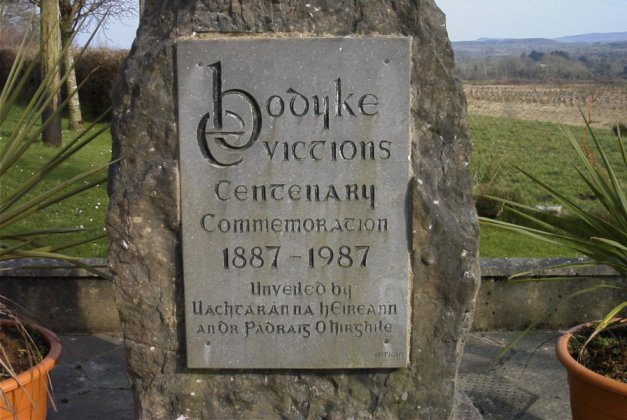
Memorial stone, marking 100 years since the Bodyke Evictions of 1887

== Amenities ==
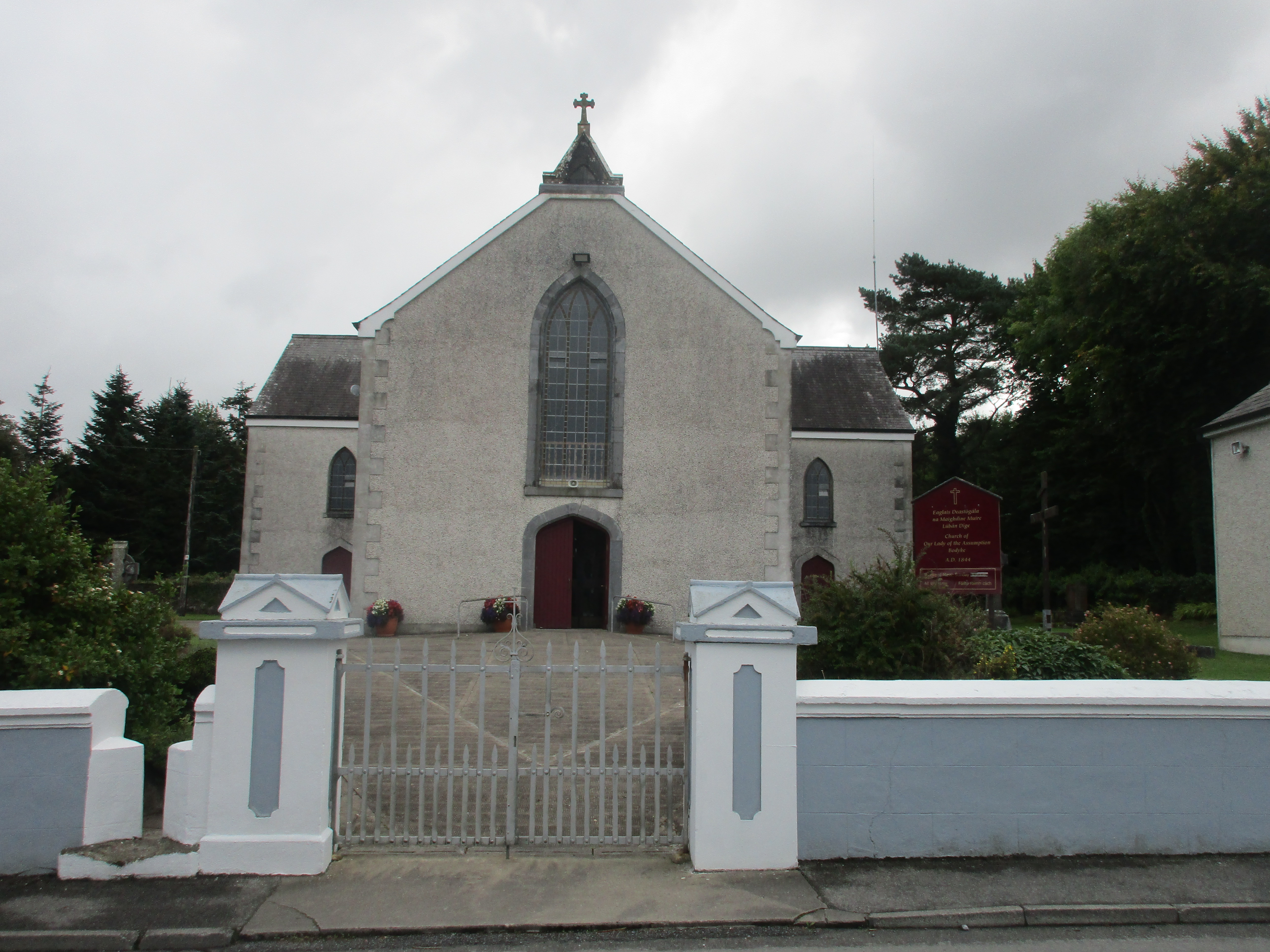
Church of Our Lady of the Assumption, Bodyke

Schools serving the area include Bodyke National School, Scariff Community School, and Tuamgraney National School. As of 2024, Bodyke National School had an enrollment of 36 pupils. The Raheen Community Hospital in Tuamgraney is a public nursing home and day center.

Bodyke's church, the Church of the Assumption, is in Bodyke parish in the Roman Catholic Diocese of Killaloe.

The local Gaelic Athletic Association (GAA) club, Bodyke GAA, won the 2017 Clare Junior A Hurling Championship and reached the semi-final stage of the 2017 Munster Junior Club Hurling Championship.

== Notable people ==
Notable people from the area include:

- Edna O'Brien (1930-2024), novelist and playwright
- Edward MacLysaght (1887–1986), senator and genealogist
