= Mountshannon =

Village in County Clare, Ireland

Mountshannon Baile Uí Bheoláin (Irish)
- Village
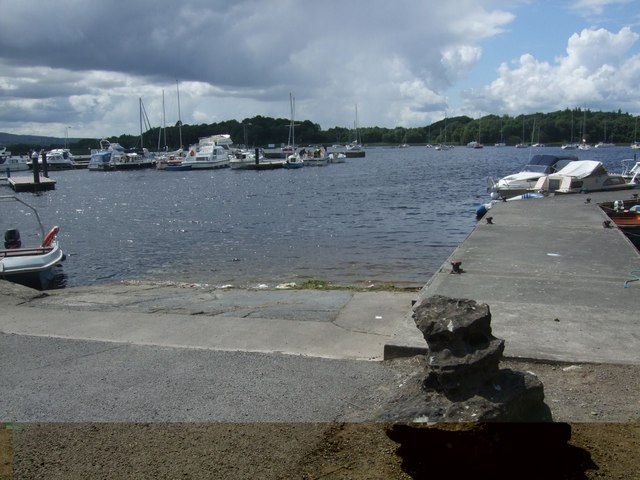
- Harbour and moorings at Mountshannon

- Location in Ireland
- Coordinates: 52°56′N 8°26′W
- Country: Ireland
- Province: Munster
- County: County Clare

Population (2022)
  - Total: 209
- Time zone: UTC+0 (WET)
  - Summer (DST): UTC-1 (IST (WEST))
- Irish Grid Reference: R700870

Mountshannon (Irish: Baile Uí Bheoláin, meaning 'townland of Ó Beoláin', historically anglicised as Ballybolan) is a village in east County Clare, Ireland. It is part of the civil parish of Inishcaltra. The village is on the western shore of Lough Derg, north of Killaloe. Mountshannon won the Irish Tidy Towns Competition in 1981.

== History ==
The village was designed and built from scratch by Alexander Woods, a Limerick merchant, who intended it as a purely Protestant settlement from which the surrounding Catholic population would be so impressed by the thrift and industry of the settlers that they would quickly convert to the Reformed Church; even as late as the 1830s there was not a single Catholic resident in the village. In fact the reverse happened - it was the Catholics who colonised the village, and the Protestant church in a wooded churchyard bears mute testimony to Woods and his scheme.

Mountshannon was home to the last manually operated telephone exchange in Ireland. The exchange was finally converted to automatic service at noon on 28 May 1987.

== Amenities ==
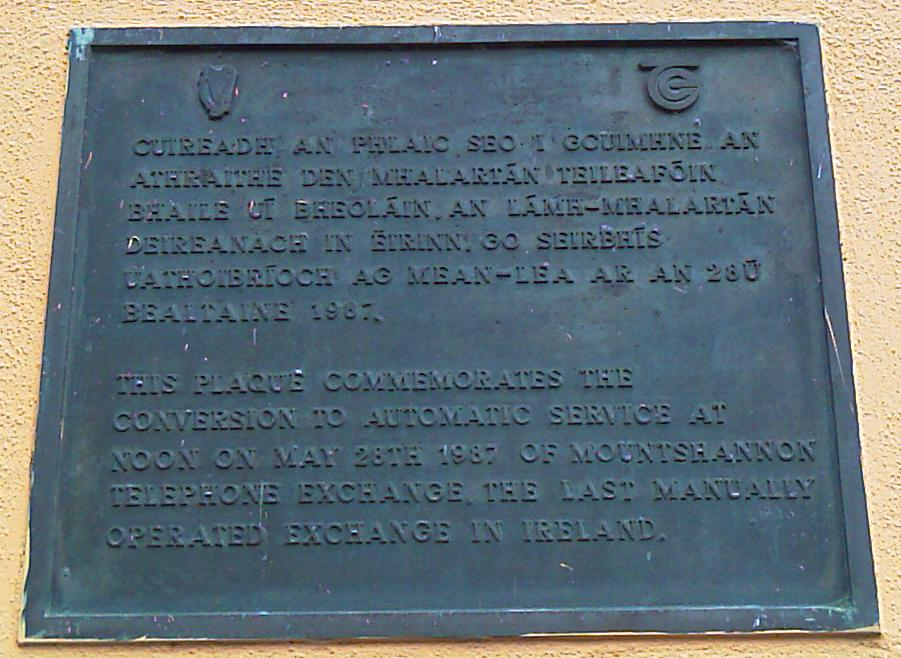
Plaque commemorating the conversion of the telephone exchange to automatic service

Mountshannon is close to Inis Cealtra, or Holy Island, an uninhabited island that was once home to a monastic settlement. The island has a round tower and the ruins of several small churches, as well as part of four high crosses and a holy well. The cemetery on this island is still in use, the coffins being transported from the Clare side in small boats. Boat trips can be taken from the harbour to the island. Mountshannon is also on the route of the East Clare Way walking trail.

There is a maze in the centre of town in a small park with views of Lough Derg. The maze features information about the development of the Irish spiritual tradition. Alongside is a picnic area made out of wood carved by local artists, encircled by willow hedging. In the entrance is a stone with a hole facing toward Holy Island. The maze is modelled on the pavement labyrinth at Chartres Cathedral in France.

Mountshannon village has two pubs, a restaurant, a petrol station/shop and a pizzeria. The town has been a recurring winner in the Tidy Towns competition, having won the national prize in 1981, silver in 2004 and numerous bronzes over the years. It also took bronze in its population category in 2010.

== Harbour ==
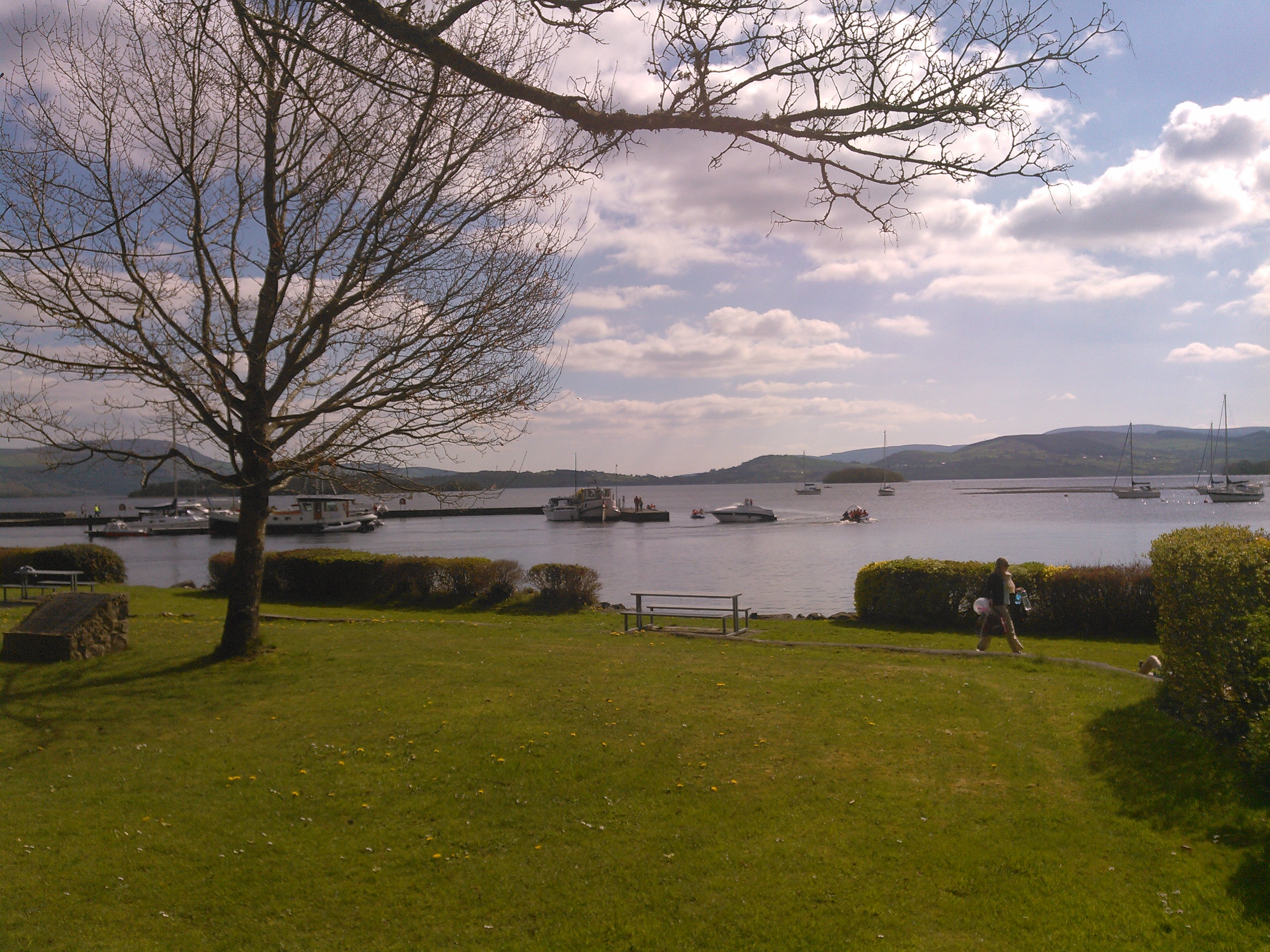
Mountshannon harbour

Mountshannon Harbour is a sheltered, south-facing harbour, used in the summer months with cruisers, who pull up for the night and visit the village. A separate bathing area is used by local families. A slipway is available for launching small craft.

== White-tailed Sea Eagles ==
A breeding pair of white-tailed eagles nested on a nearby island in Lough Derg in 2012. This marked a success for the Irish reintroduction programme, which started in County Kerry in the summer of 2007. In early May 2013, the first eaglets were born in Ireland since the re-introduction programme began; one in the Killarney National Park and two here. In 2014 and 2015, further chicks were hatched.

== Civil parish ==
The village of Mountshannon lies in the civil parish of Inishcaltra. In 1898, the parishes of Inishcaltra and Clonrush were transferred from County Galway to County Clare.

== Catholic parish ==
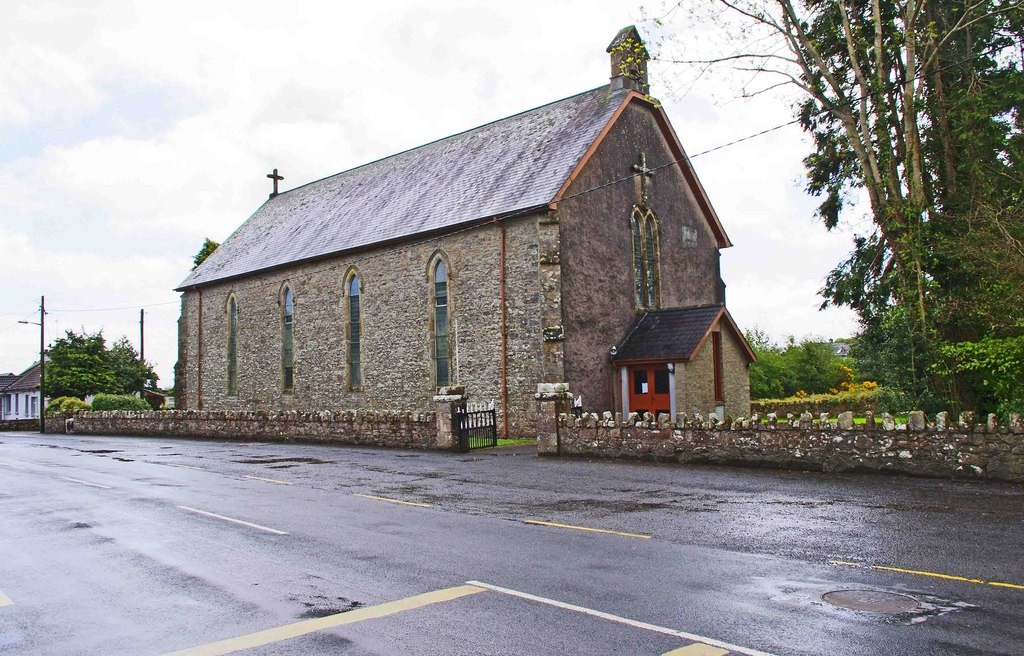
St. Caimins Catholic Church in Mountshannon

== Church of Ireland ==
The Church of Ireland parish of Mountshannon and Tuamgraney encompasses the villages of Mountshannon and Tuamgraney. This parish contains the 10th century St. Cronan's Church, Tuamgraney, the oldest church in continuous use in Ireland and the United Kingdom.

== Festivals ==
Mountshannon hosts a number of events such as the Mountshannon Trad Festival, the Lough Derg Rally, and the annual Mountshannon Festival of Arts which usually takes place around the end of May into the beginning of June.

== Annalistic references ==
See Annals of Inisfallen

- AI922.2 Tomrair son of Elgi, a Jarl of the foreigners, on Luimnech (the Lower Shannon), and he proceeded and plundered Inis Celtra and Muicinis, and burned Cluain Moccu Nóis; and he went on Loch Rí and plundered all its islands, and he ravaged Mide.

== See also ==
- List of towns and villages in Ireland

== Bibliography ==
- "Inishcaltra". Parliamentary Gazetteer of Ireland 1845.
