= Bodyke (parish) =

Bodyke Kilnoe and Tuamgraney
- Roman Catholic parish
- Location in Ireland
- Coordinates: 52°53′02″N 8°35′59″W
- Country: Ireland
- Province: Munster
- County: County Clare
- Time zone: UTC+0 (WET)
  - Summer (DST): UTC-1 (IST (WEST))

Bodyke, also known as Kilnoe and Tuamgraney, is a parish in County Clare, Ireland. It is part of the Inis Cealtra grouping of parishes within the Roman Catholic Diocese of Killaloe. It is an amalgamation of parts of the mediaeval parishes of Tomgraney (Tuamgraney) and Kilnoe.

The main church of the parish is the Church of the Assumption in Bodyke, in the part Kilnoe. This church was completed in 1845. It replaced a chapel built between 1740 and 1760. The second church of the parish is the St. Joseph's Church at Tuamgraney. This church was built in 1892-1893 and replaced a chapel built in 1812. This chapel was built on swampy ground, rendering it unsafe.

As of 2025, the co-parish priests were Kieran Blake and Pat Larkin.

== Gallery ==
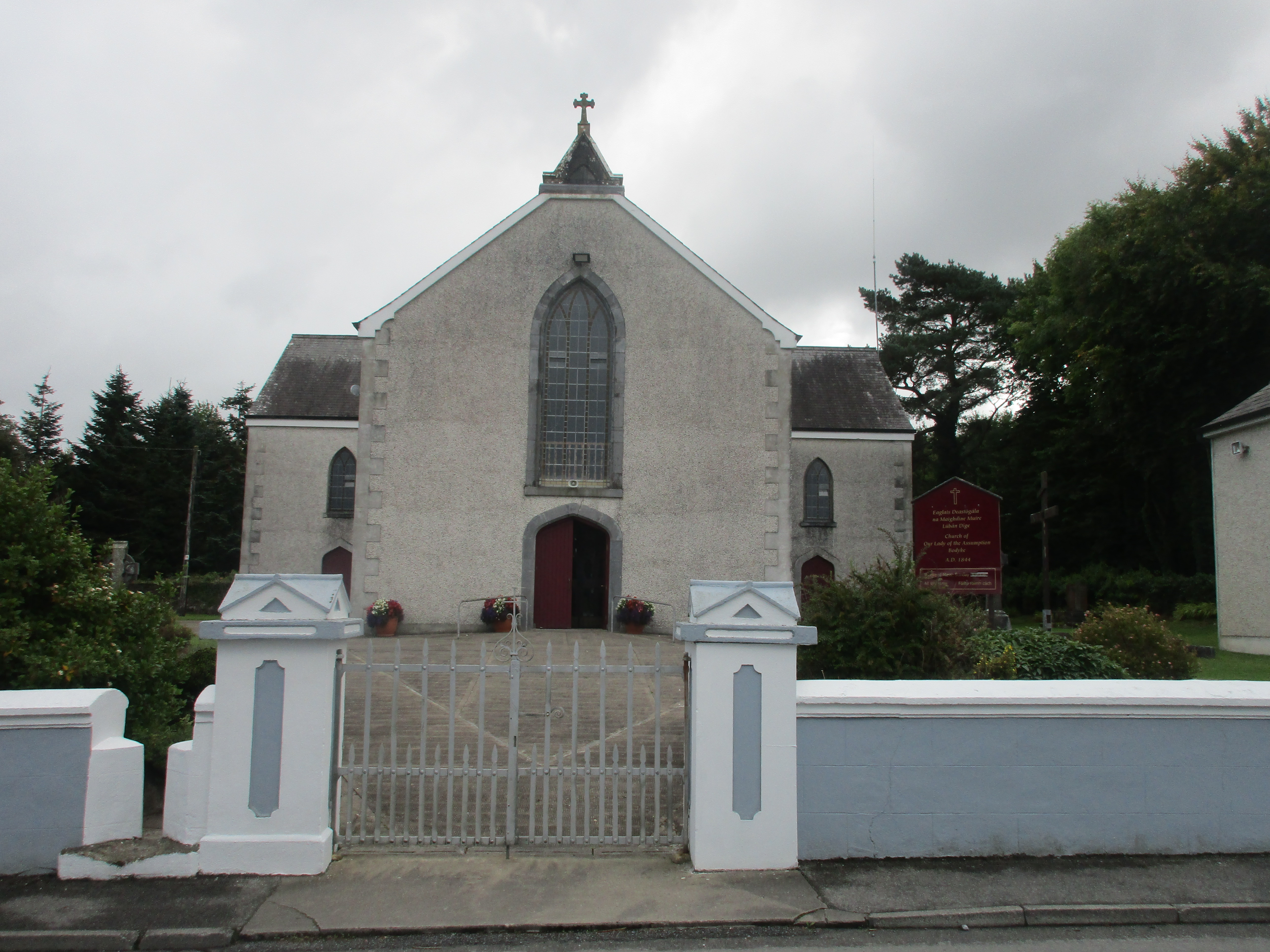
Church of Our Lady of the Assumption

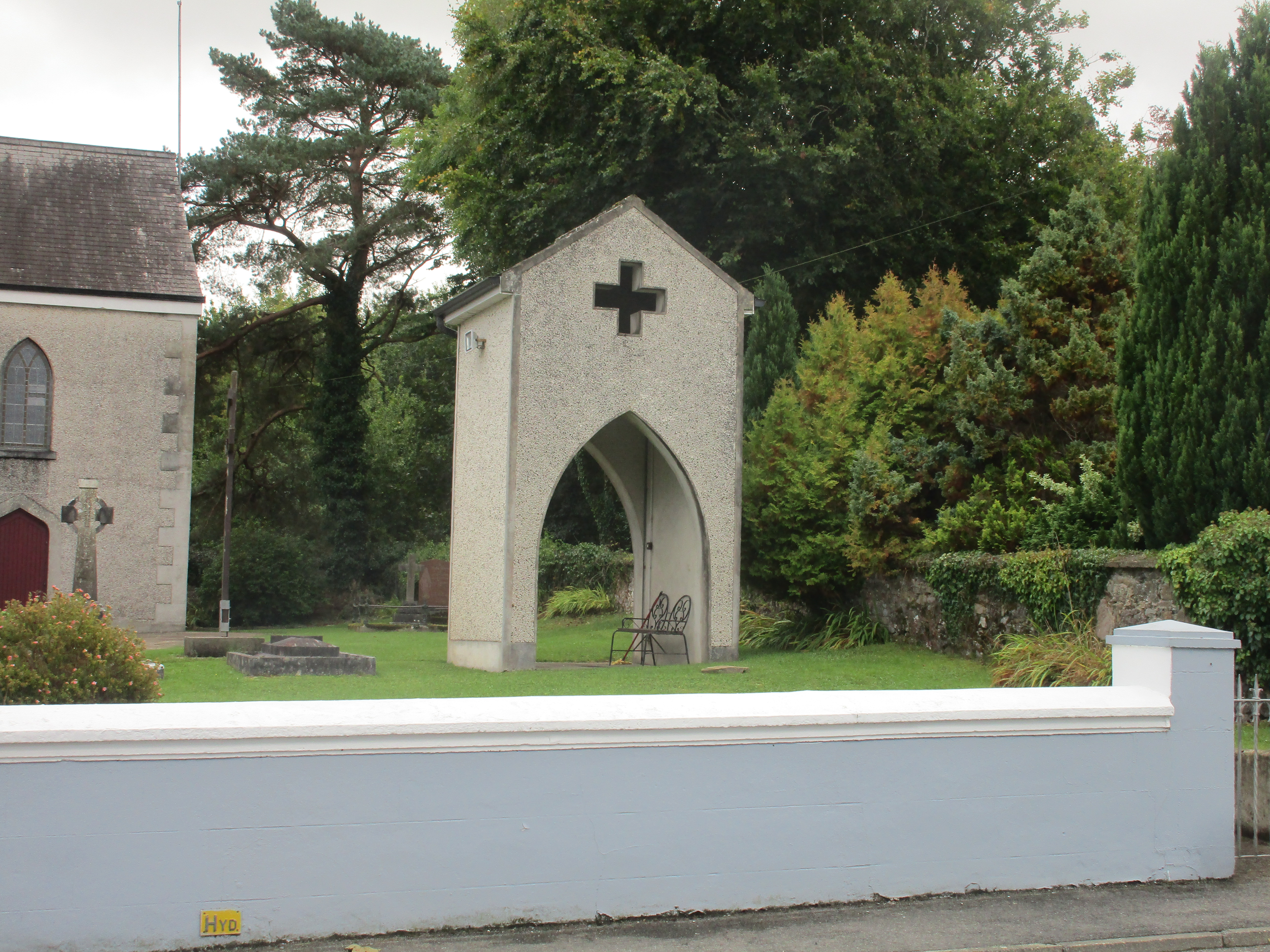
Belltower of the Church of Our Lady of the Assumption

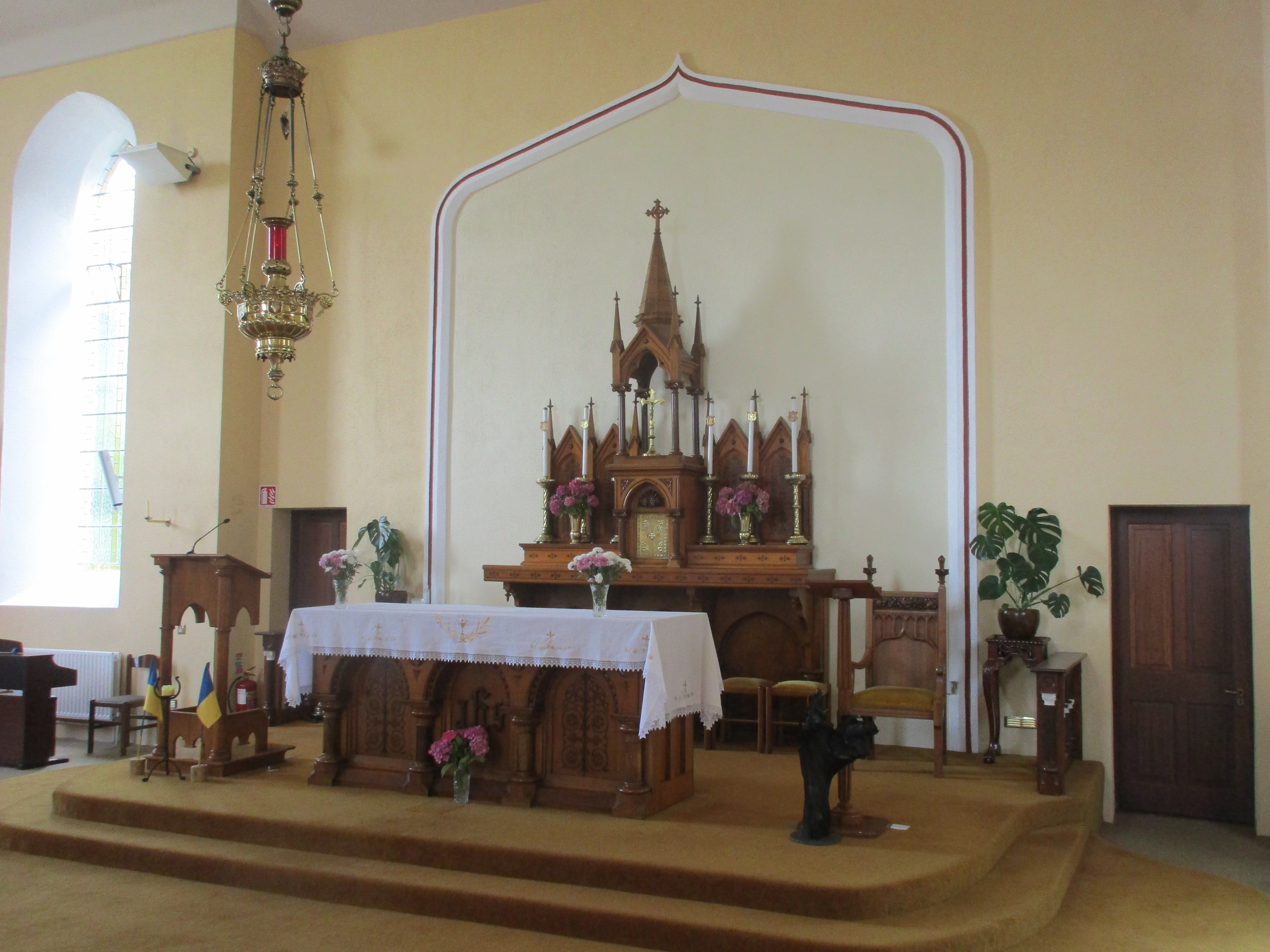
Altar of the Church of Our Lady of the Assumption
