= Cormac ua Cillín =

Abbot of Tuamgraney in Ireland

Cormac ua Cillín (died 966) was abbot of Tuamgraney.

Cormac was the ancestor of the Ó Cillín family, who were coarbs of Tuamgraney. The Chronicon Scotorum, sub anno 966, states:

- Cormac ua Cillín, of the Uí Fhiachrach of Aidne, successor of Ciarán and Comán and comarba of Tuaim Gréne — and by him was built the great church of Tuaim Gréne, and its bell-tower — a sage and an old man and a bishop, rested in Christ.

Ua Cillín founded St. Cronan's Church, Tuamgraney.
