= Clonrush =

Civil parish in County Clare, Ireland

Clonrush Cluain Rois
- Civil parish
- Location in Ireland
- Coordinates: 52.950784°N 8.372747°W
- Country: Ireland
- Province: Munster
- County: County Clare
- Time zone: UTC+0 (WET)
  - Summer (DST): UTC-1 (IST (WEST))
- Website: www.clonrush.eu

Clonrush or Clonmulsk (Irish: Cluain Rois) is a civil parish in the barony of Leitrim, now in County Clare, Ireland. The largest settlement in the parish is Whitegate.

== Location ==
Clonrush is 10.5 miles (16.9 km) to the southwest of Portumna. It is 4.5 by 4.25 miles (7.24 by 6.84 km) and covers 11,850 acres (4,800 ha) of which 4,439 acres (1,796 ha) are in Lough Derg. The parish includes a belt of low-lying land along the lakeside, rising into mountainous country. The road from Woodford to Scarriff crosses the parish.

== History ==
The Clonrush graveyard was established around the 12th century in an early Christian settlement on a ridge beside Church Bay in Lough Derg. The parish church gave its name to the bay. A portion of the building remains, including a 12th-century window in the east gable, restored in the 16th century with cut limestone. In the early 1800s the church was used as a school, and was modified to accommodate a thatched roof. It is now ruined. There are records of a castle on the shoreline near the graveyard and a monument higher up, overlooking it. The graveyard contains a small vaulted house called St. Colman's Oratory, with a Gothic doorway from the 16th century.

The parish in 1837 was in the Catholic union of Clonrush and Inishcaltra, each of which held a chapel. In 1841 the population was 3,115 in 516 houses. The parish in 1848 contained the hamlets of Whitegate, Furnace and Fogarty's. At that time it was within County Galway. In 1898 the parishes of Inishcaltra and Clonrush were transferred from County Galway to County Clare. Today the civil parish is part of the Catholic parish of Mountshannon-Whitegate in the Roman Catholic Diocese of Killaloe. The church of St Flannan is in Whitegate.

== Townlands ==
The townlands are Ballinrooaun, Ballyglass, Ballyhinch, Ballynakillew, Ballynamona, Bargarriff, Birchpark, Boleynagoagh North, Boleynagoagh South, Cappagha, Cappantruhaun, Cartron, Clonrush, Cloonmohaun, Cloonoolia North, Cloonoolia South, Cregg, Derrainy, Drummaanadeevan, Drummaan East, Drummaan South, Drummaan West, Furnace, Garraun, Garryeighter, Gortnascreeny, Gweeneeny, Illaunmore, Kilcooney, Kilkittaun, Lakyle, Meelick, Rinskea, Tintrim and Whitegate.
