= Moynoe =

Civil parish in County Clare, Ireland

Moynoe Maigh nEo
- Civil parish
- Location in Ireland
- Coordinates: 52.923031°N 8.510855°W
- Country: Ireland
- Province: Munster
- County: County Clare

Moynoe (Irish: Maigh nEo) is a civil parish in County Clare, Ireland. It is part of the Roman Catholic parish of Scarriff and Moynoe.

== Location ==
Moynoe parish lies in the barony of Tulla Upper. It is 1.5 miles (2.4 km) northeast of Scariff. The parish is 7 by 2.75 miles (11.27 by 4.43 km) and covers 9,848 acres (3,985 ha). On the northern boundary Lough Atorick has a surface-elevation of 450 feet (140 m) above sea-level. Most of the parish, apart from a district of 2.5 miles (4.0 km) beside Scariff bay on Lough Derg, is in the Slieve-Baughta mountains.

== Settlements ==
The parish was originally called Moyno Norbree. Moyno means the plain of the yew tree, but the meaning of Norbree is unknown. As of 1897 the ruin of the old church was in reasonably good condition. Near it a ruined arch was probably a gateway that led to Moynoe castle, the property of Edmond O’Grady. Further off is a holy well dedicated to Saint Mochunna, the patron saint of Feakle as well as of Moynoe. The parish contains the townlands of Cappaghabaun Mountain, Cappaghabaun Park, Carrowmore, Meenross, Moynoe, Pollagoona Mountain, Sheeaun, Tobernagat and Turkenagh Mountain.

The population in 1841 was 1,475 in 237 houses and the main hamlet was Coolcoosaun.

== Church history ==
In 1633 Richard Boyle, 1st Earl of Cork, bought ten quarters of land north of the Graney River in the Tuamgraney parish, including the castle and ironworks of Scarriff. These lands were combined with the old Moynoe parish to form the Scariff parish. Today Scariff and Moynoe is a parish of the Roman Catholic Diocese of Killaloe.
