= Margaret Hinchey =

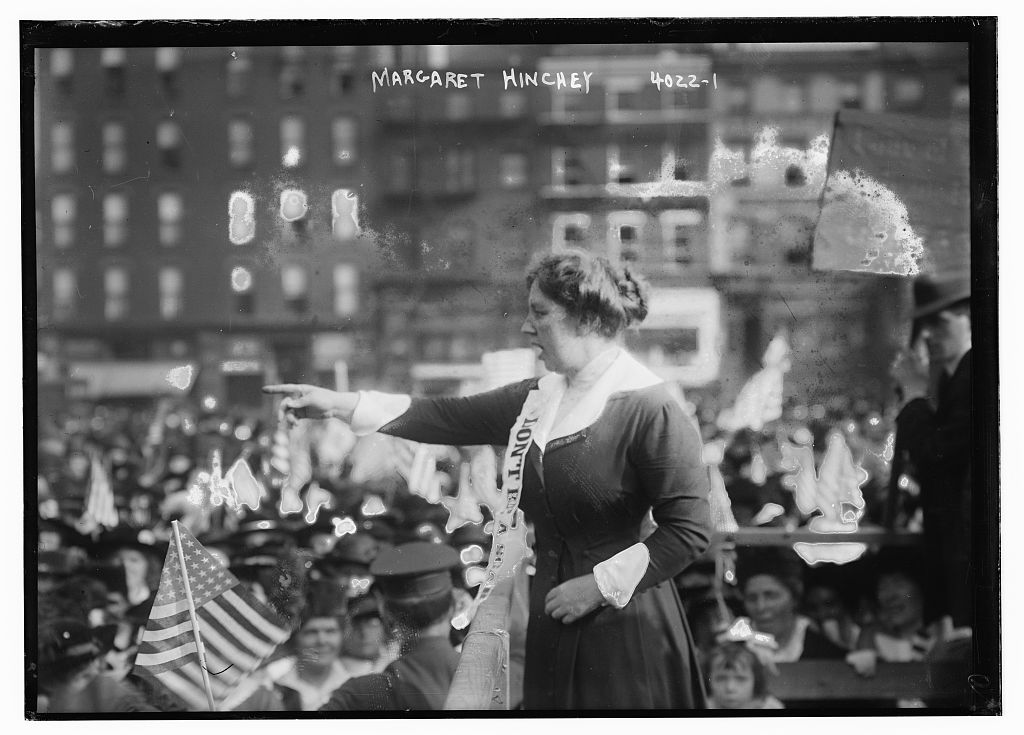
- Margaret Hinchey in 1916
- Born: 19 October 1873; Clare, Ireland
- Died: 29 February 1944 (aged 70); Manhattan, New York City

Margaret Hinchey (19 October 1873 – 29 February 1944) was an American suffragist, labor organizer, and leader. She was publicly active in these causes between 1912 and 1917.

== Biography ==
She was born on the 19 October 1873 at Coolready, Bodyke parish, county Clare, to Thomas Hinchy and Mary Moloney as the eldest daughter of eight children. She emigrated to New York City in 1892 and worked in a laundry.

In February 1914, Hinchey spoke at the White House in Washington D.C. for a meeting of the Equal Suffrage League, recounting her meeting (along with 35 other women suffragists) with President Woodrow Wilson to push for women's suffrage. By 1920 she was working as a domestic servant.

She died in Manhattan, New York City on 29 February 1944.

== Strikes/Marches/Movement ==
In 1909-1919 Hinchey was a part of the "Women's Suffrage Party" in the State of New York.

In 1914 Hinchey was a part of the "Women's Suffrage Movement" in the state of Montana.
