= Inishcaltra =

Civil parish in County Clare, Ireland

Inishcaltra Inis Cealtra
- Civil parish
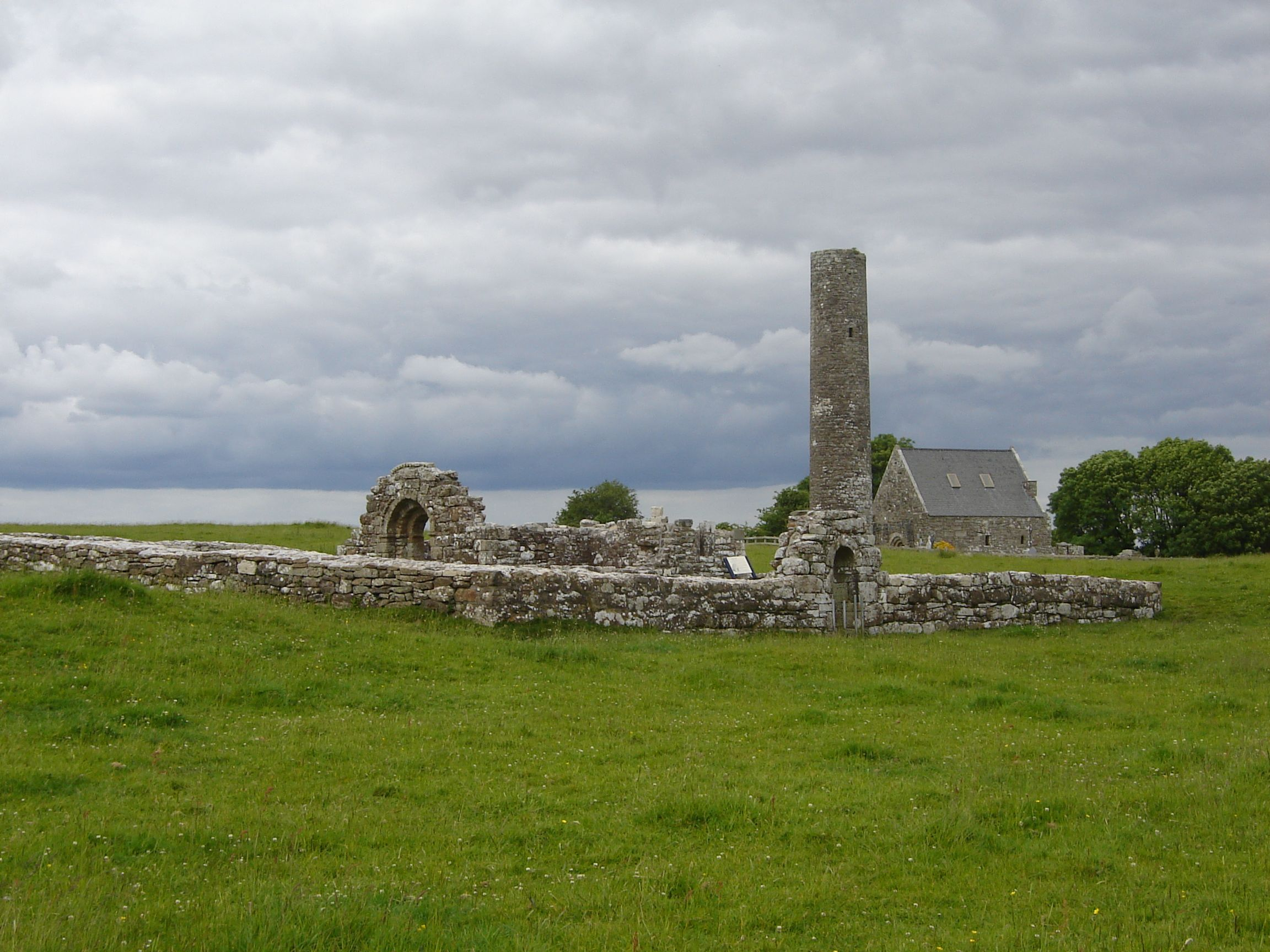
- St. Brigid's church and St. Caimin's church and tower on Holy Island

- Location in Ireland
- Coordinates: 52.931517°N 8.429739°W
- Country: Ireland
- Province: Munster
- County: County Clare
- Time zone: UTC+0 (WET)
  - Summer (DST): UTC-1 (IST (WEST))

Inishcaltra (Irish: Inis Cealtra) is a civil parish in the barony of Leitrim in County Clare, Ireland. The main settlement in the parish is the village of Mountshannon. It is noted for the eponymous island of Inis Cealtra, which is an ancient Christian monastic site. In the Catholic Church, the parish is part of the ecclesiastical parish of Mountshannon (Clonrush).

== Location ==
Inishcaltra is 3.75 miles (6.04 km) northeast of Scarriff. The parish is 4 by 4 miles (6.4 by 6.4 km), and covers 11,283 acres (4,566 ha). It mostly is located on the western shore of Lough Derg and includes some of the lough's islands such as Red Island, Inniscalthra, Young's Island, Basley Island, and Cribby Island. There is a belt of low land along the lake, rising into the Slieve-Baughta mountains. The road from Scarriff towards Portumna and Loughrea runs along the lake shore.

== History ==
The island of Inis Cealtra after which the parish is named lies about 0.5 miles (0.80 km) from the shore. It is often called the Holy Island. It was the scene of pre-Christian religious activities. The 70 feet (21 m) pillar tower may have been used in sun worship. More recently the island was the site of Christian structures, including various cells or oratories, now ruined. The main church, Teampol Camin, located in Mountshannon, is named after the founder or patron, Saint Camin who died around 658. Danish raids took place in 834, 908 and 946.

The total population in 1841 was 2,378 in 383 houses. By 1851, after the famine, the number had dropped to 1,457 through emigration and deaths from starvation.

The parish was in County Galway from 1610 to 1898. By the terms of the Local Government (Ireland) Act 1898, Inishcaltra and its neighbouring parish of Clonrush were transferred from the county of Galway to the county of Clare while remaining part of the barony of Leitrim.

== Townlands ==
Townlands of the parish are: Bohateh North, Bohateh South, Cappaduff, Cloonamirran, Cloontyconnaught, Cloontymweenagh, Coogypark, Cooldorragha, Curratober, Derroran East, Derroran West, Derrycon Lower, Derrycon Upper, Dooros, Glenwanish, Inishcaltra, Kilrateera Lower, Kilrateera Upper, Knockaphort, Magherareagh, Middleline North, Middleline South, Mountshannon, Sellernaun East, Sellernaun West and Woodpark.
