= Kilnoe =

Civil parish in County Clare, Ireland

Kilnoe An Chill Nua
- Civil parish
- Location in Ireland
- Coordinates: 52.885551°N 8.642513°W
- Country: Ireland
- Province: Munster
- County: County Clare

Kilnoe (Irish: An Chill Nua) is a civil parish in County Clare, Ireland. It is a rural area, part of the Roman Catholic parish of Bodyke.

== Location ==
Kilnoe parish lies in the barony of Tulla Upper, 3.75 miles (6.04 km) southwest of Scarriff. It is 5 by 3.5 miles (8.0 by 5.6 km) and covers 10,512 acres (4,254 ha). The land in the east and center of the parish is mountainous, moorish, and boggy. The west is more suitable for farming. It contains Loughs Annilloon, St. Bridget, Derrymore, and Kilgory.

In 1837 there were the ruins of the castle of Coolreath near the southern shore of Lough O’Grady and a ruined castle at Ballynahince. Neither of these castles are mentioned in the list of castles of 1580, perhaps because they had not been built at that time. As of 1841 the population was 3,482 in 574 houses.

== Townlands ==
The parish contains the townlands of Annaghneal, Ballydonaghan, Ballynahinch, Caherhurley, Clogher, Clonmoner, Coolready, Coolreagh, Coolreagh Beg, Coolreagh More, Drummond, Inchalughoge, Kilgory, Kilnoe and Lisbarreen.

== Church history ==
The name "Kilnoe" is not appropriate for a church. Since there is a holy well dedicated to Saint Mochuille, the church was probably also dedicated to that saint. There is little left of the old church, but there is a large churchyard beside the ruin, The southern part of Tuamgraney parish was combined with the medieval parish of Kilnoe early in the 18th century to form the Catholic parish of Bodyke. The present Roman Catholic parish of Bodyke encompasses Bodyke, Kilnoe and Tuamgraney, and is part of the Roman Catholic Diocese of Killaloe.
