= Feakle =

Village in County Clare, Ireland

Feakle An Fhiacail
- Village
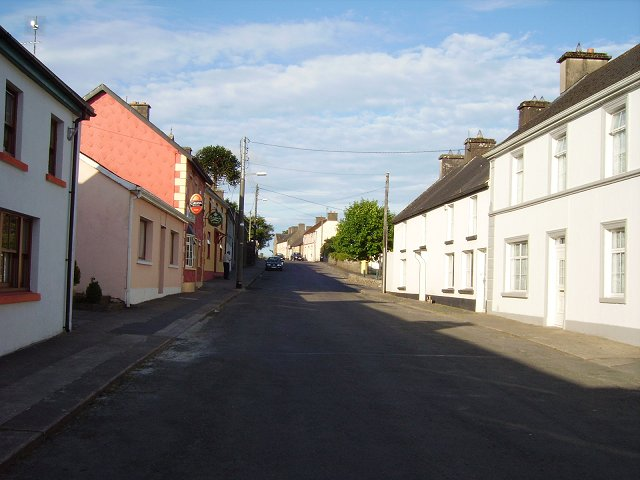
- Feakle village centre

- Location in Ireland
- Coordinates: 52.92589°N 8.649763°W
- Country: Ireland
- Province: Munster
- County: County Clare

Population (2022)
  - Total: 134

Feakle (historically Feakell and Fiakil, from Irish: an Fhiacail, meaning 'the tooth') is a village in County Clare, Ireland, in the Roman Catholic parish of the same name. The village is in a townland and civil parish of the same name.

== Location ==
"Paroiste na fiacaile" means parish of the tooth. A legend says that the tooth of Mochonna, the patron saint, fell out in this place, where he built his church. Other theories are that the place is named after a church that was roofed with "fiathgail", a rough local grass, or that the name comes from "Fia-Choill", the wood of the deer.

The village is in the Tulla Upper barony, 4.5 miles (7.2 km) northwest of Scarriff on the road to Gort. In 1837 it contained 8,844 inhabitants and covered about 30,000 acres (12,000 ha). An 1845 description said "the surface consists of the loftiest, wildest, and most northerly of the western uplands of the county; and includes the southern declivities of the Slieve-Baghta mountains, and those offshoot ranges and masses which embosom Lough Graney, and stretch toward Lough O’Grady. The highest ground is on the west, and has an altitude of 1,312 feet."

The parish of Feakle is in the Roman Catholic Diocese of Killaloe. Parish churches are St Joseph's in Kilclaren and St Mary's in Feakle. The village population in 2006 was 122, and 134 at the 2022 census. It neighbours Lough Derg and the towns of Tulla and Scarriff. Feakle is famous for its traditional music festival.

== History ==
St. Mochonna is venerated as the patron saint of Feakle. The ancient ruins of his church were destroyed in the early 19th century.

Under the religious persecution of the Catholic Church in Ireland imposed by the Penal Laws, the Catholics of Feakle would travel in secret to a Mass rock located at a megalithic tomb in the nearby Ballycroum bog.

On 12 December 1974 Irish Republican Army and Sinn Féin leaders met at Smith's Hotel, Feakle, with the leaders of the main Irish Protestant Christian denominations (Church of Ireland, Methodist, and Presbyterian) to discuss ways of resolving the Northern Ireland crisis. The Gardaí (Irish police) broke up the meeting. Although any wanted IRA men had already departed, the churchmen did pass on the list of Republican demands to the British government. Methodist leader Eric Gallagher was in attendance and later became the subject of the book Peacemaker by author Dennis Cooke.

== People ==
- Biddy Early (1798–1874), a herbalist and healer who was accused, under an antiquated law, of witchcraft in 1865. Local folklore says that if you leave a coin at her house you will have good health, but take a coin and you will have bad luck.
- Martin Hayes (b. 1962), fiddler, was born in Feakle.
- Ger Loughnane (b. 1953), former Clare hurler and manager of Galway hurling team.
- Brian Merriman (c.1747–1805), a local bard, fiddler, and hedge schoolmaster, is associated with the area. Although neither born, nor did he die, in Feakle, he chose to be buried here where he had spent most of his life. Feakle is also where he composed the lengthy comic poem Cúirt an Mheán Oíche (The Midnight Court). A monument to Merriman's memory was erected by An Cumman Merriman (the Merriman Society) in the local graveyard.
- Dan Minogue (1893–1983), Australian federal politician
- Johnny Patterson (1840-1889), singer and composer who was born in Kilbarron near Feakle

== See also ==
- List of towns and villages in Ireland
