= Mountshannon-Whitegate =

Parish in County Clare, Ireland

- Catholic parish
- Location within Ireland
- Coordinates: 52°56′N 8°26′W
- Country: Ireland
- Province: Munster
- County: County Clare
- Time zone: UTC+0 (WET)
  - Summer (DST): UTC-1 (IST (WEST))

Mountshannon-Whitegate, formerly Clonrush, is a parish in County Clare, Ireland, and part of the Inis Cealtra grouping of parishes within the Roman Catholic Diocese of Killaloe. As of 2022, the co-parish priest is Joe McMahon.

The parish is an amalgamation of two medieval parishes: Clonrush and Iniscaeltra (or Holy Island).

== Churches ==
There are two churches in the parish.

The main church is the St. Caimin's Church in Mountshannon. The gothic-style church was built in 1836 on a design by parish priest Fr. Patrick O'Meally. The building was not a success and already in 1845 the building was raised some 5 feet.

The second church of the parish is the Church of St. Flannan in Whitegate. This church was built in 1969. It replaced and earlier church built in 1870 on the other side of the road.

== gallery ==
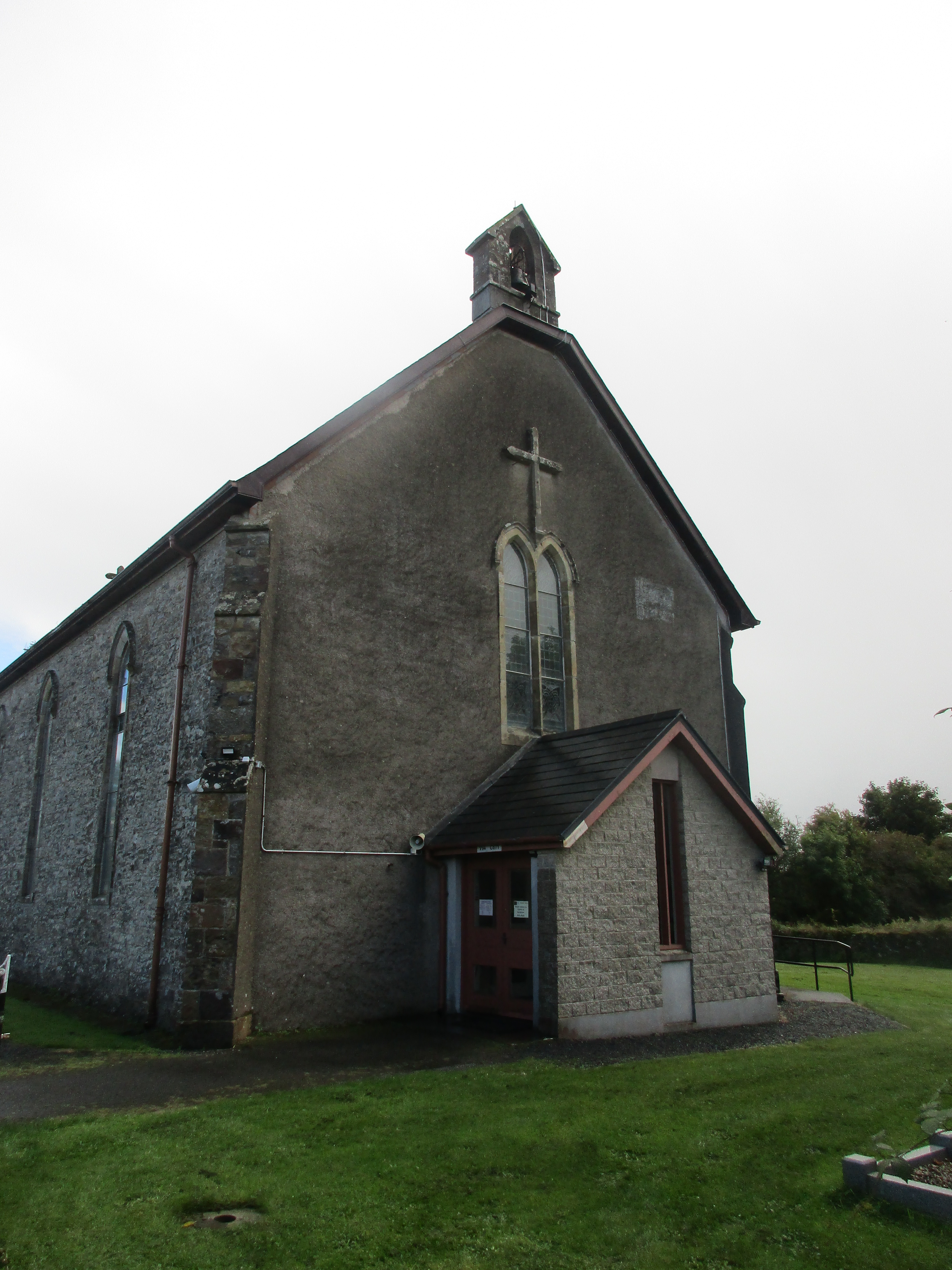
St. Caimin's Church in Mountshannon

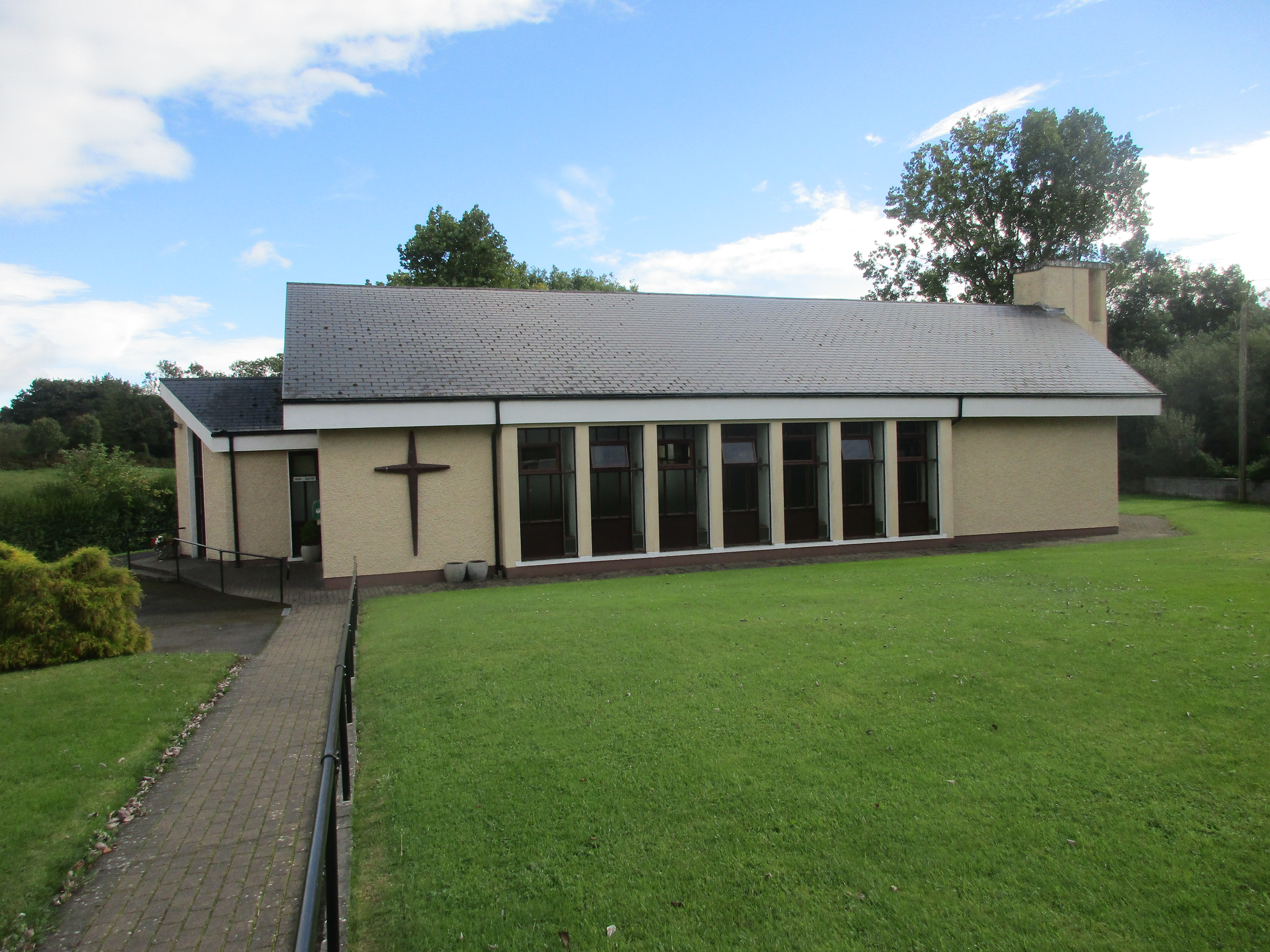
Church of St. Flannan in Whitegate

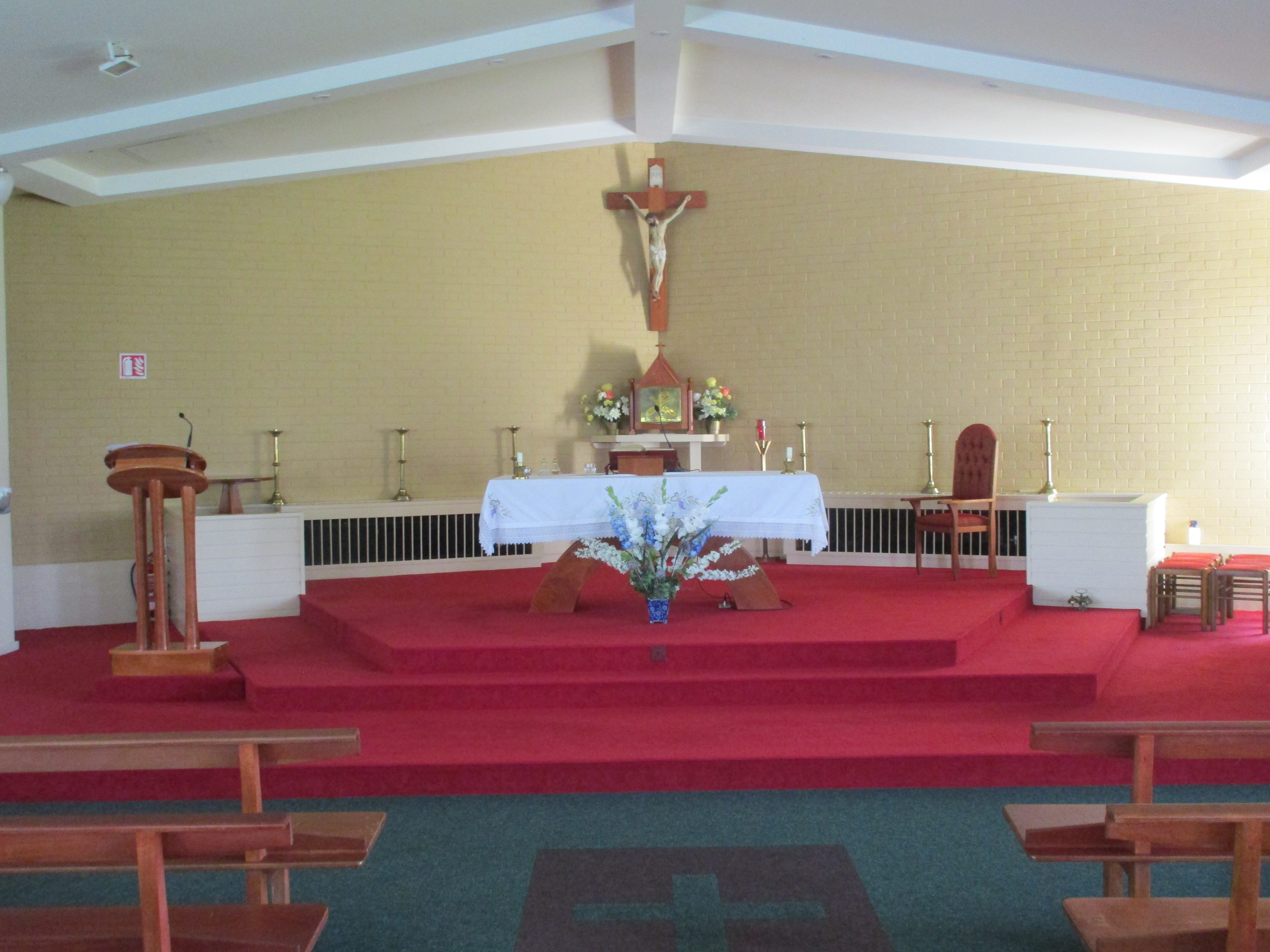
The sanctuary

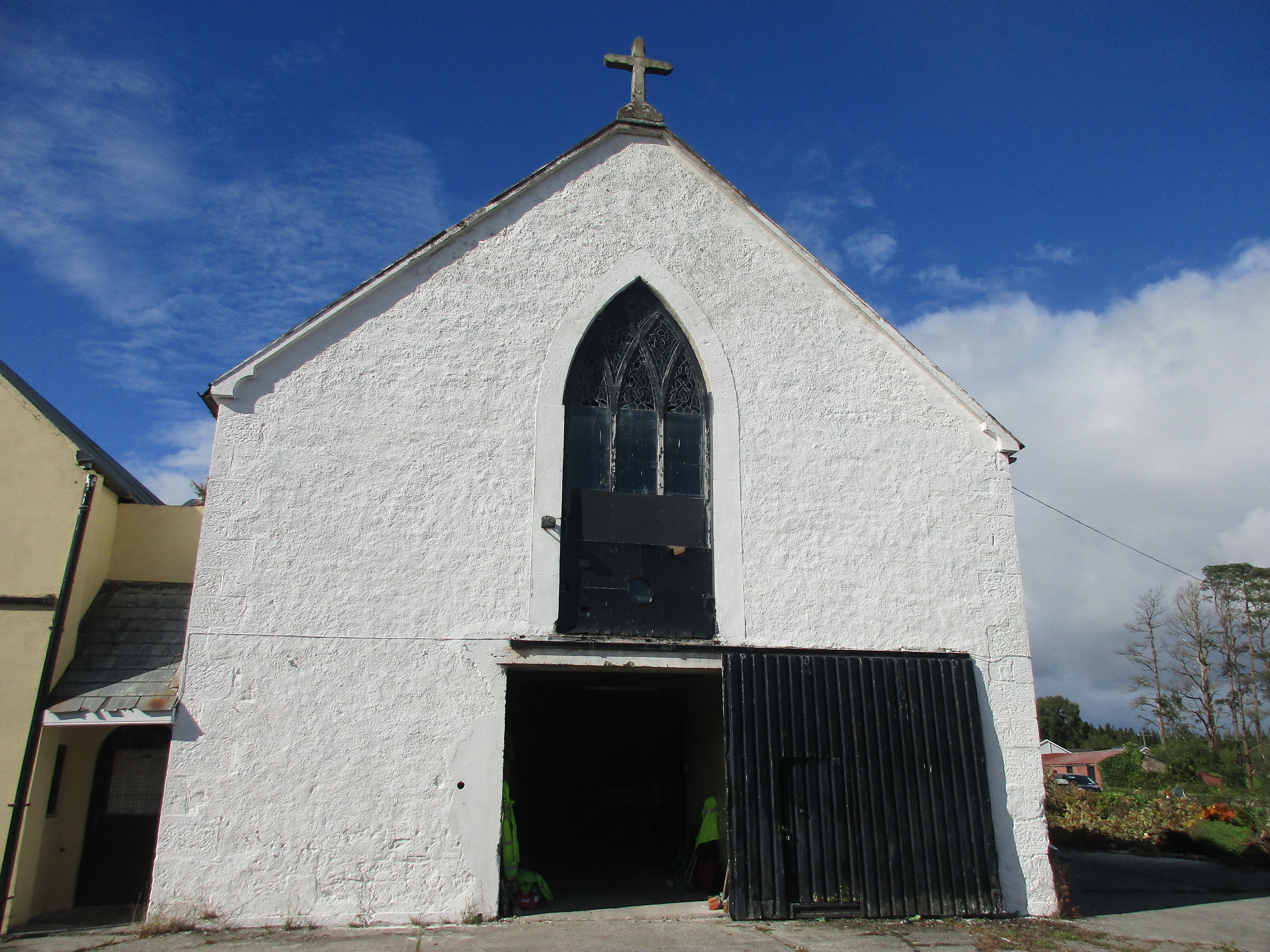
Former church of Whitegate
