= Killanena (parish) =

Catholic parish in County Clare, Ireland

- Roman Catholic parish
- Location in Ireland
- Coordinates: 52°58′59.5″N 8°42′16.3″W
- Country: Ireland
- Province: Munster
- County: County Clare
- Time zone: UTC+0 (WET)
  - Summer (DST): UTC-1 (IST (WEST))

Killanena, also known as Killanena and Flagmount, is a parish in County Clare, Ireland, and part of the Inis Cealtra grouping of parishes within the Roman Catholic Diocese of Killaloe.

The co-parish priest is Fr. Pat Larkin.

Originally, Killanena was part of the large parish of Feakle. I was temporary split off in 1839. In 1842 this became permanent.

== Churches ==
Shortly after his appointment as first priest of the parish, Fr. William Moloney started with upgrading the places of worship in his parish. He replaced the old chapels in Killanena and Flagmount by new churches, both named St. Mary's Church.

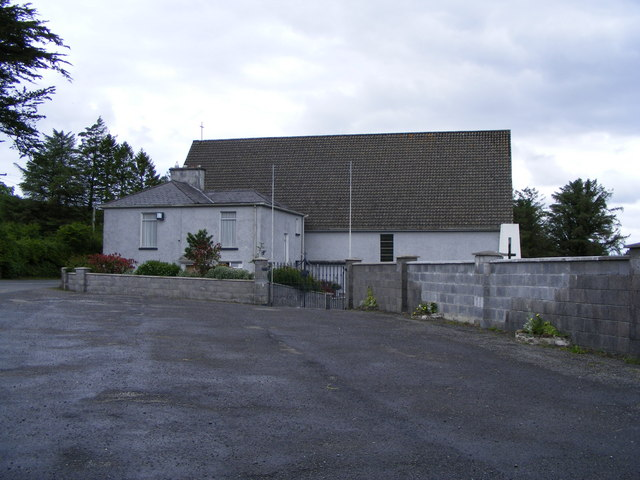
St. Mary's Church in Killanena

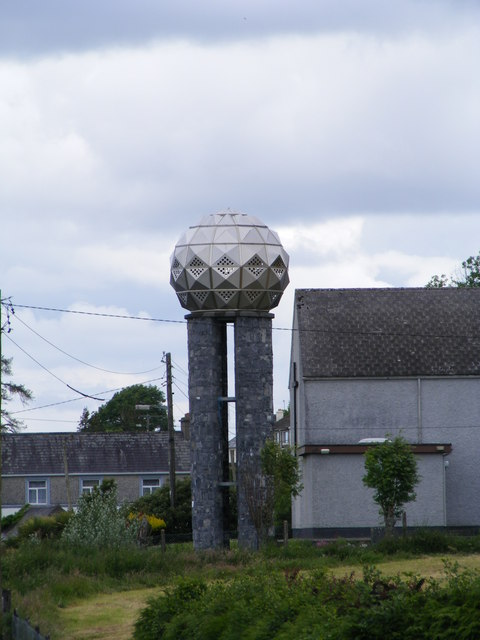
Bell tower of St. Mary's Church in Flagmount

== Notable people ==
- Joseph Rodgers - bishop of Killaloe 1955-1966
