= Feakle (parish) =

Catholic parish in County Clare, Ireland

- Roman Catholic parish
- Location in Ireland
- Coordinates: 52°55′33.2″N 8°38′59.15″W
- Country: Ireland
- Province: Munster
- County: County Clare
- Time zone: UTC+0 (WET)
  - Summer (DST): UTC-1 (IST (WEST))

Feakle is a parish in County Clare, Ireland, and part of the Inis Cealtra grouping of parishes within the Roman Catholic Diocese of Killaloe.

As of 2025, the co-parish priest is Fr. Pat Larkin.

Feakle used to be the biggest parish in the diocese of Killaloe and in 1839 it was temporary (permanent in 1842) split into two parishes: Feakle and Killanena.

== Churches ==
The main church of the parish is the Church of St. Mary in Feakle. The cruciform church was built in 1826.

The second church is the St. Joseph's Church in the townland Kilclarin, north-east of Feakle. This church is built in 1863 and replaced the earlier chapel. The church is in the same townland but not the same location as the chapel. The church was renovated in 1981.

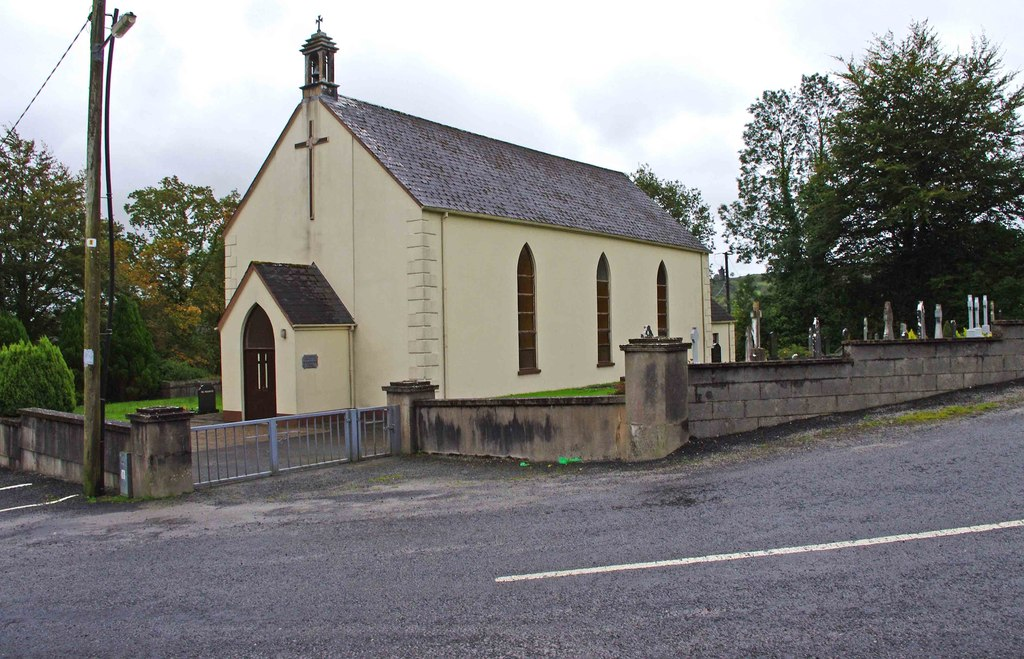
St. Joseph's Church in the townland Kilclaren
