= St. Cronan's Church, Tuamgraney =

Church in County Clare, Ireland

St. Cronan's Church
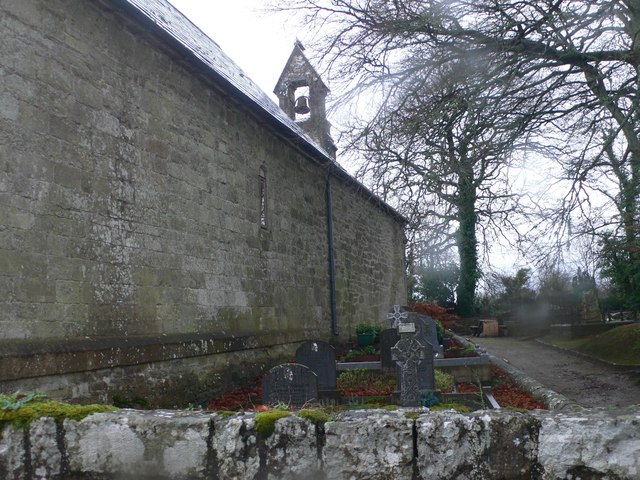
- St. Cronan's Church
- 52°53′48″N 08°32′22″W
- Country: Ireland
- Denomination: Church of Ireland
- Previous denomination: Roman Catholic

History
- Founded: 10th century CE
- Founder: Cormac ua Cillín

Administration
- Diocese: Diocese of Tuam, Limerick and Killaloe
- Parish: Mountshannon and Tuamgraney (Killaloe Union)

St. Cronan's Church is a 10th-century Church of Ireland church in Tuamgraney, County Clare, Ireland. It is the oldest church in continuous use in Ireland. The Tuamgraney parish operates as a unit with the Mountshannon parish in the Killaloe Union of parishes in the Diocese of Tuam, Limerick and Killaloe.

== History ==
A wooden monastery was built at the site before 550 CE, most likely by Saint Cronan. Despite looting by vikings in 886 and 949, the monastery thrived. The current stone church was built by Cormac ua Cillín around 949–964 CE. In 1012, the church was repaired by Brian Boru, High King of Ireland, whose brother Marcán was Abbot of Tuamgraney at the time. It is the only preserved building with a recorded link to Brian Boru. The building was extended in the 12th century. Archaeologically and architecturally, it is described as a Type 2 unicameral mortared pre-Romanesque church in Zone 2 (west of the River Shannon). Ua Cillin also built a round tower on the site, but this no longer exists. Outside the church is a large stone which appears similar to a washing stone found at Ross Errilly Friary in County Galway.

One of the earliest records of tower building in Ireland dates to Ua Cillin's obituary in the Chronicon Scotorum, which notes: "he had built the ‘great’ church and round tower" at Tuamgraney. The church is referred to in the Annals of Clonmacnoise and radiocarbon dating links it with Clonmacnoise, Dulane, Lorrha and Ardfert Cathedral.

== Modern use ==
In 1839, the Irish language scholar John O'Donovan visited the church as part of his Ordnance Survey work. He did not enter the church and stated: "The present church of Tuaim Greine is of no antiquity, and there is nothing there by which the antiquarian can be interested but a rude castle." The castle to which he referred is the 15th century O'Grady's Castle which is extant.

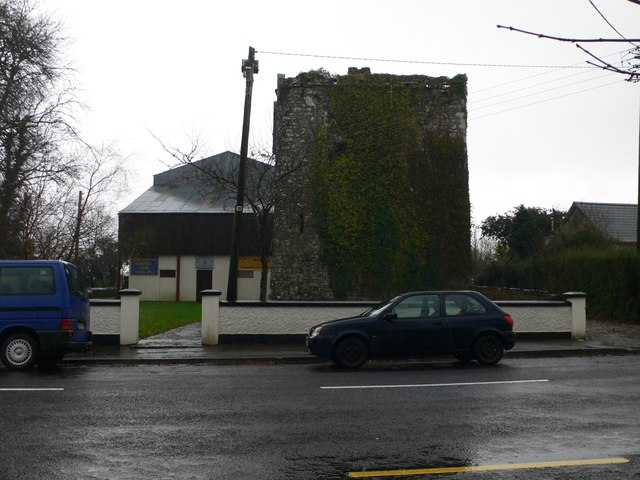
O'Grady's Castle by St. Cronan's Church, Tuamgraney

Both Church of Ireland and Roman Catholic followers are buried in the church's graveyard, including genealogist Edward MacLysaght and the parents of writer Edna O'Brien. The church remains in use by the Church of Ireland as a place of worship.

== Heritage centre ==
In 1989, a local voluntary group established the East Clare Heritage Centre (ECHC) and in 1992 acquired a 21-year licence on the property. The licence on the church expired in October 2013 but was extended until October 2014. The Church of Ireland Dean declined to renew the licence, preferring the church to be used exclusively as a place of worship.

The centre was officially opened by President of Ireland Mary Robinson in June 1991. As well as St. Cronan's Church, the group's work included the 7th century monastic settlement of Holy Island (Inis Cealtra) and a restored Famine memorial park. The centre obtained charitable status in 2002 and received an annual maintenance grant of €10,000 from Clare County Council until 2009. The centre published a regular journal and several books.

== Design ==
The church is built from roughly coursed sandstone which was sourced within 3 km of the church. Its design contains elements of cyclopean masonry with a deep anta of 0.59 metres. The ashlar walling in the chancel is rare for a pre-Romanesque building. It is similar in form to Clonmacnoise and retains its original doorway, the lintel and architrave of which denote its significance to worshippers.

=== Carved head ===
Inside the church lies a carved Romanesque sandstone head which was originally part of the external wall on the eastern gable. Until its complete restoration in 1990, it was covered in several layers of plaster, with only the nose visible. It is known locally as Gráinne and thought to be the provenance of the placename of Tuamgraney; alternatively the carving is claimed to represent St. Cronan himself.

=== Windows ===
In 1990, a three-light stained glass window by renowned stained-glass artist Alfred E. Child worth approximately €1 million was added to the eastern window of the church by ECHC. Titled The Ascension, it shows Jesus accompanied by 2 angels. The window had been commissioned in 1906 by a Miss Ivers in memory of her parents. It had been vandalised at its former location in the disused parish church of Kilfinaghta, County Clare. The northern wall includes a 12th-century Romanesque window with chevrons on its arch and sides. The south wall features 4 windows, one decorated with fretwork and another with spirals.
