= Inis Cealtra =

Island in County Clare, Ireland

Nickname: Inishcaltra / Holy Island
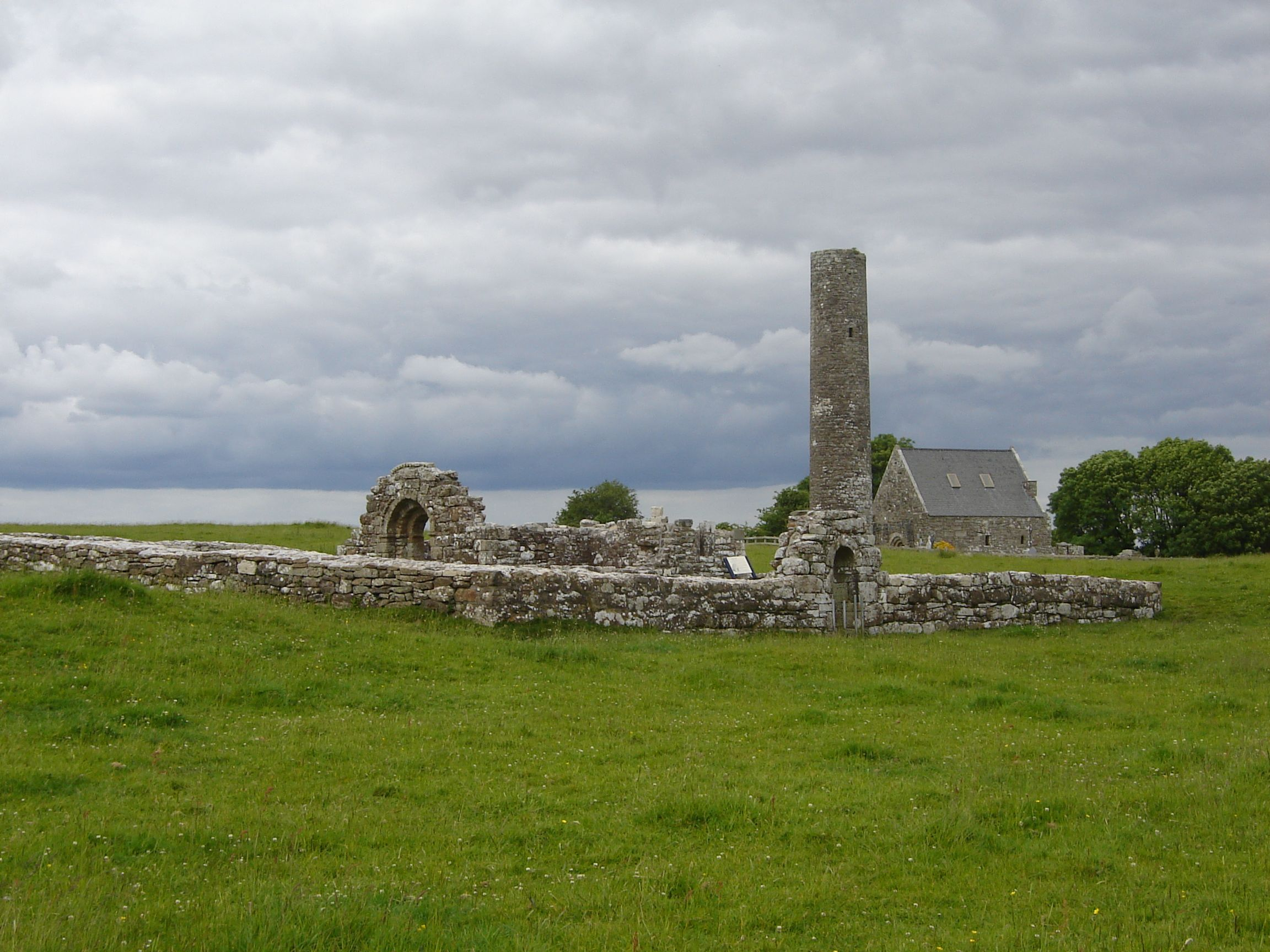
- St. Caimin's and Brigid's churches

- Location within island of Ireland

Geography
- Location: Lough Derg (Shannon)
- Coordinates: 52°54′54″N 8°27′0″W

Administration
- Ireland
- Province: Munster
- County: Clare

Demographics
- Population: 0

Inis Cealtra, also known in English as Inishcaltra or Holy Island, is an island off the western shore of Lough Derg in Ireland. Now uninhabited, it was once a monastic settlement. It has an Irish round tower, and the ruins of several small churches, as well as four high crosses and a holy well. Despite the lack of population, the cemetery on this island is still in use. Coffins and mourners are transported the short distance from County Clare in small boats. Boat trips can be taken from the harbour at Mountshannon. It is conserved by the East Clare Heritage Centre.

== History ==
Around 520 AD, St. Colum (d. 548) founded a monastery on Inis Cealtra. It formerly belonged to the Cenél Donnghaile in the territory of the Ó Grádaigh. The second monastery, a famous school of learning, was founded by St. Caimin (d. 653), who was Bishop-Abbot of Inis Cealtra and possibly the first Bishop of Killaloe. Vikings visited the island in 836; led by Turgesius, they killed many of the monks. A further Viking attack led by Tomrair took place in 922. Marcán, brother of Brian Boru, was Bishop-Abbot of Tuamgraney and later Inis Cealtra until his death in 1003. The religious buildings of Inis Cealtra were not occupied after the reformation.

Until 1849, the island was part of County Clare, even though the adjoining shore of the mainland was in County Galway. In 1849, the island was transferred to Galway as part of Griffith's Valuation, which was mandated to eliminate detached portions of counties. However, in 1899, the district electoral division containing both the island and adjoining mainland was transferred from Galway to Clare under the Local Government (Ireland) Act 1898.

== Ecclesiastic ruins ==
There are several ruins on the island.

The pilgrim's path is a low curved earthwork between St. Caimin's Church and St. Michael's church.

The small Romanesque Baptism Church is enclosed by a stone wall. The doorway is an arch of three orders. The church was blown down in severe winds during 1839 and was later rebuilt as a house and as an ironworks.

St. Caimin's Church is the only roofed building, part of it dating back to the 10th century. In the 12th century, a Romanesque doorway was created in the western wall. In 1879 it was reconstructed as an arch of three orders. In 1978 that doorway was taken down. In 1981 it was rebuilt in an arch of four rather than three orders. Inside the church, there are crosses, monuments, gravestones and a sundial.

St. Mary's Church ruins are from the 13th century. Inside there are graves and an O'Brien tomb.

St. Michael's Church is the name given to the remains of a small building which appears to have been a church. Old Ordnance Survey maps mark it as "Garaidh Mhichaeil" (Michael's garden) it was most likely a cillín, a burial ground for unbaptised children.

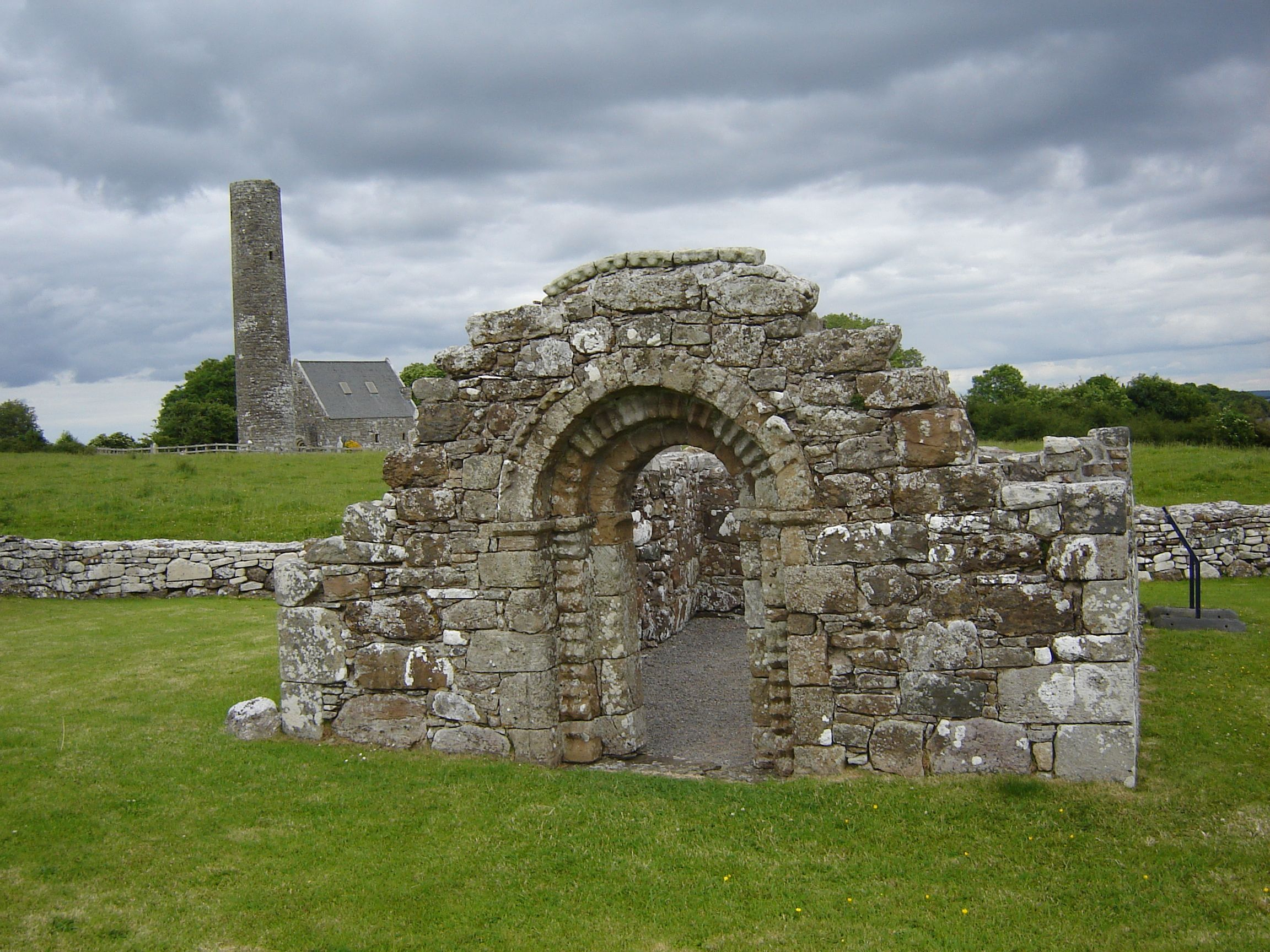
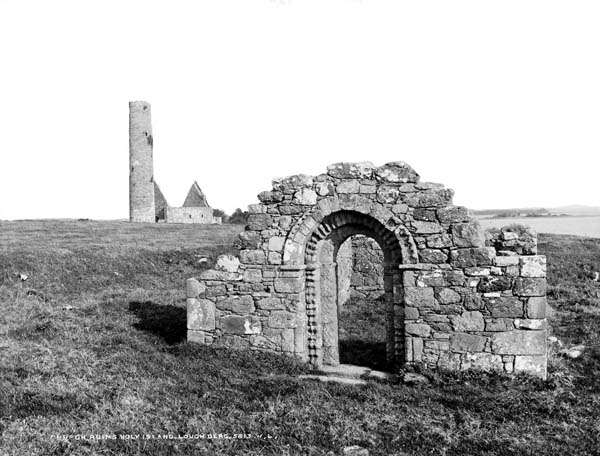
Romanesque archway on Inis Cealtra photographed in the 19th and 21st centuries

The Round Tower was surveyed by Dr. Liam de Paor and restoration was carried out between 1970 and 1980. The round tower's cone-cap was not found implying that the tower was never finished. This fits in with the legend that a beautiful witch distracted the stonemason.

The entrance to the Saints' Graveyard is through the 19th-century graveyard. The 11th-century markers are inscribed in Irish. The confessional, pre 11th century, whose original use is unknown is situated outside the walls of the graveyard. It was used as a confessional during the 18th and 19th centuries and was rebuilt in the renovations of 1979. There are five known Bullaun stones on the island.

== People ==
- Saint Donatus of Fiesole, teacher, poet, and Bishop of Fiesole was educated at Inis Cealtra.
- St. Caimin's Church and the round tower are attributed to Brian Boru
- The wife of Toirdelbach Ua Briain was buried here in 1076.
- The poet and Nobel laureate William Butler Yeats (1865-1939), who lived for a while not far away in the restored Norman Castle of Thoor Ballylee, wrote about Inis Cealtra and Lough Derg in his ballad The Pilgrim
- Edna O'Brien (1930–2024), novelist, memoirist, playwright and poet, was buried here in August 2024.

== Annalistic references ==
AI922.2 Tomrair son of Elgi, a Jarl of the foreigners, on Luimnech (the Lower Shannon), and he proceeded and plundered Inis Celtra and Muicinis, and burned Cluain Moccu Nóis; and he went on Loch Rí and plundered all its islands, and he ravaged Mide.

— Annals of Inisfallen

== Other projects ==
Media related to Holy Island, County Clare at Wikimedia Commons
