= Flagmount, County Kilkenny =

Flagmount An Leac Gharbh
- Townland
- Location in Ireland
- Coordinates: 52°39′38″N 7°05′42″W
- Country: Ireland
- Province: Leinster
- County: County Kilkenny
- barony: Gowran
- Civil parish: Gowran
- Time zone: UTC+0 (WET)
  - Summer (DST): UTC-1 (IST / WEST)
- Irish Grid Reference: S615562

Flagmount (Irish: An Leac Gharbh, meaning 'rough flat stone or rock') is a combination of two townlands located within the barony of Gowran and on the R712 National primary road, (formerly the N10 National Primary Route) in County Kilkenny, Ireland. It is located in Gowran civil parish.

It is divided into Flagmount North and South with a total area of 452 acres (1.83 km^{2}).

== History ==
It was the southernmost point of territory of the Ó Cearbhaill part of Ely O'Carroll in Éile.

== Transportation ==
The M9 motorway between Dublin and Waterford which passes through Flagmount was opened in September 2010. The new bridge crossing over the motorway was opened to traffic in March 2010.

== See also ==
- List of townlands in County Kilkenny
- List of towns and villages in Ireland
