= Whitegate, County Clare =

Village in County Clare, Ireland

Whitegate An Geata Bán (Irish)
- Village
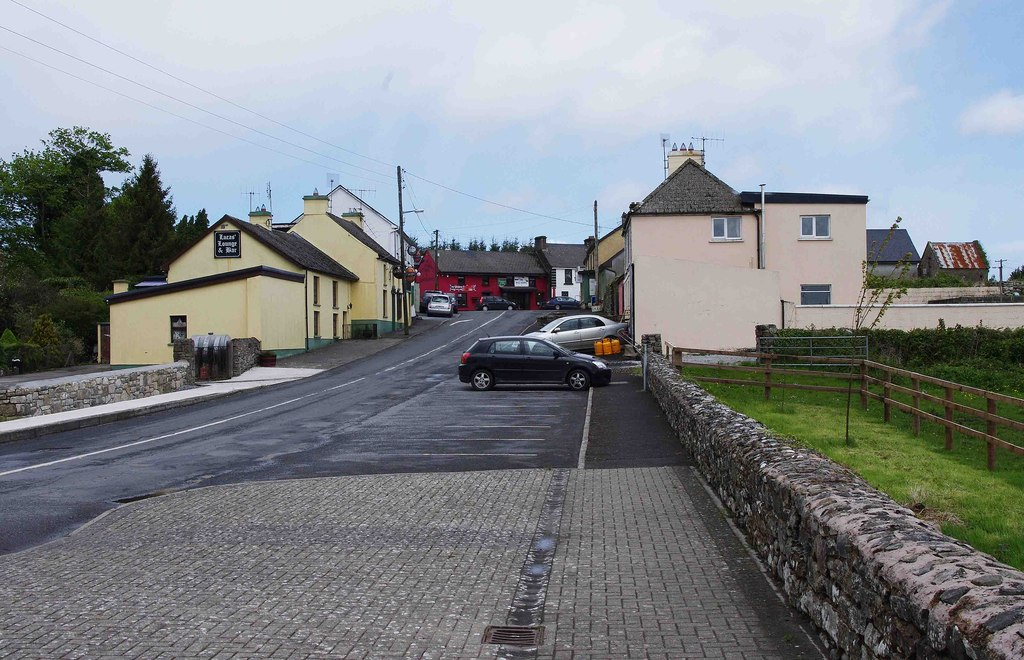
- Shops and pubs in Whitegate village

- Location in Ireland
- Coordinates: 52°57′00″N 8°22′24″W
- Country: Ireland
- Province: Munster
- County: County Clare

Population (2022)
  - Total: 181
- Time zone: UTC+0 (WET)
  - Summer (DST): UTC-1 (IST (WEST))
- Irish Grid Reference: R746888

Whitegate (Irish: An Geata Bán, meaning 'the white gate') is a village on the R352 regional road in northeastern County Clare, Ireland.

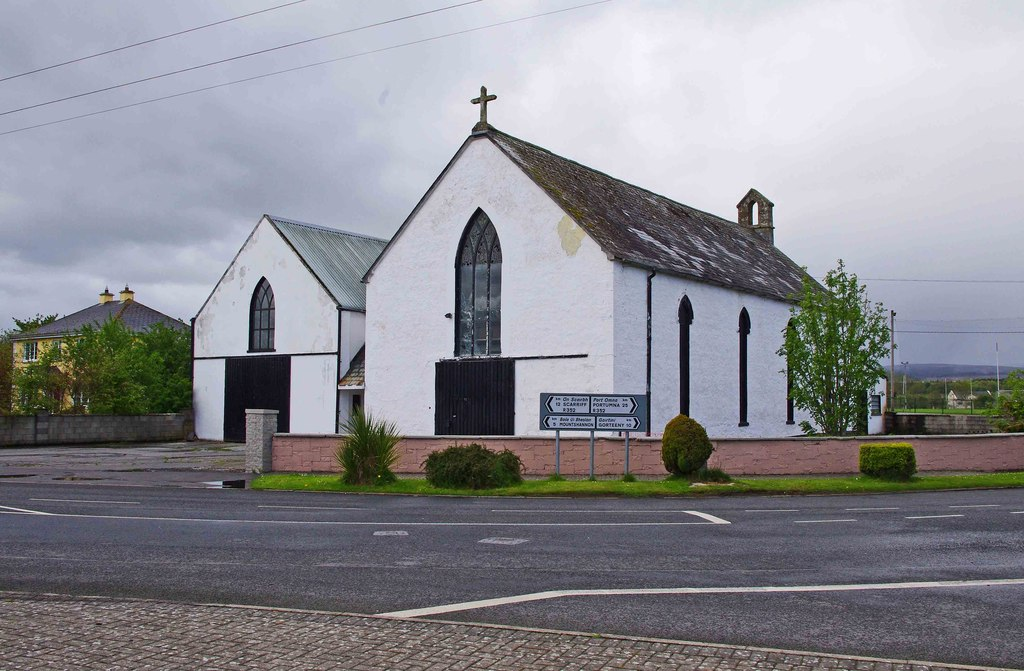
Former church in Whitegate. A smaller church was built across the road.

It is part of the Catholic parish Mountshannon-Whitegate. The former local church, which had been in disuse for some years, is now a warehouse and lumberyard. A newer church was erected in 1969.

== See also ==
- List of towns and villages in Ireland
