= Tuamgraney =

Village in County Clare, Ireland

Tuamgraney Tuaim Gréine
- Village
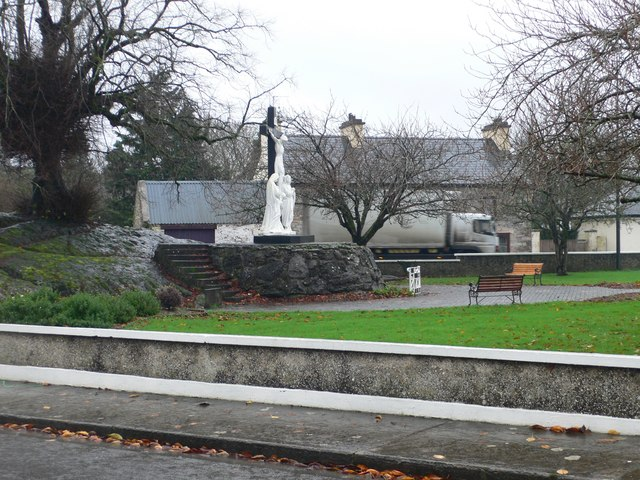
- Tuamgraney Garden of Remembrance

- Location in Ireland
- Coordinates: 52°54′00″N 8°32′00″W
- Country: Ireland
- Province: Munster
- County: County Clare

Population (2022) Scarriff-Tuamgraney
  - Total: 854
- Time zone: UTC+0 (WET)
  - Summer (DST): UTC-1 (IST (WEST))
- Irish Grid Reference: R639845

Tuamgraney (/tʃuːmˈɡreɪniː/; archaically spelled Tomgraney, Tomgrenei; Irish: Tuaim Gréine, meaning 'Tomb of Grian') is a village in eastern County Clare in the west of Ireland and a civil parish by the same name. Situated about a kilometre from the River Graney which flows into Lough Derg, it is an ancient settlement, noted for St Cronán's Church, said to be the oldest church in constant use in Ireland. For census purposes, Tuamgraney and neighbouring Scarriff form the census settlement of Scarriff-Tuamgraney, which had a population of 854 at the 2022 census.

== Location ==
The parish is in the barony of Tulla Upper and contains the villages of Scarriff and Tomgraney. It is 7.5 by 2.75 miles (12.07 by 4.43 km) and covers 14,181 acres (5,739 ha). The parish is rugged, with heights ranging from 1,126 to 122 feet (343 to 37 m) above sea level. It contains the Graney River from its headstreams through Lough O'Grady to its mouth in Scariff bay, Lough Derg. The village of Tuamgraney lies in such close proximity to the town of Scariff that today the two are often considered to be one single settlement. There is a holy well dedicated to St. Cronán in the Currakyle townland. The nearby castle of Tuamgraney is still in a good state of preservation.

== History ==
According to legend, "Tuamgraney, or Tuam Greine, refers to both the mound of the sun and the tomb of Grian (Irish: 'Sun'). It is part of the ancient territory of Ui Dhanghaile, which incorporated neighbouring Scariff (Maynoe), Tuamgraney, Inis Cealtra (Holy Island) and Clonrush. Grian’s mound just outside the village marks the site of the first recorded suicide in Irish history. She ‘of the bright cheeks’ was a princess in pre-Christian Ireland, the daughter of a king who lived in the Sliabh Aughty mountains of East Clare. She was famous for her beauty but was of unnatural origin, ‘begotten by a human being on a sunbeam.’ Oh what imagination those ancients had! When told this she became depressed and drowned herself in a lake since called Lough Graney. Her body floated down the Graney River and was found near Lough Derg at a place known as Derrygraney – the wood of Grian. She was buried under a mound and the place became known as Tuamgraney or Tuam Greine, the tomb of Grian. Pillar stones today stand sentinel beside her mound. The Memorial Park honours those who fell during the Irish War of Independence. Dr Edward MacLysaght, Ireland's foremost family historian, is also commemorated there."

Tuamgraney parish was founded by a saint named Cronán or Chronain, possibly the same Crónán Abbot and bishop who founded Roscrea. The place is mentioned in the annals from as early as 735 AD. There was a round tower, which was repaired by Brian Boru, and the castles of Tuamgraney and Scarriff. In 1560 both castles belonged to Edmond O'Grady.

In 1633 Richard Boyle, 1st Earl of Cork, bought ten quarters of land north of the Graney River, including the castle and ironworks of Scarriff. These lands were combined with the old Moynoe parish to form the Scariff parish. Today the village of Scarriff is in the Roman Catholic parish of Scariff and Moynoe, part of the Roman Catholic Diocese of Killaloe. The southern part of Tuamgraney parish was combined with the medieval parish of Kilnoe early in the 18th century to form the parish of Bodyke. The Roman Catholic parish of Bodyke encompasses Bodyke, Kilnoe and Tuamgraney, also in the Killaloe Diocese.

The Ó Cillín family were coarbs of Tuamgraney.

The novelist Edna O'Brien was born in Tuamgraney in 1930 and local villagers along with prominent members of the society at the time would encourage the burning of her novels.

Noted genealogist Edward MacLysaght is buried at St. Cronan's Church.

=== Annalistic references ===
See Annals of Inisfallen (AI)

- AI749 Kl. Death of Conchellach, abbot of Tuaim Gréine.
- AI934.1 Kl. Repose of Rebachán son of Mothla, abbot of Tuaim Gréine and king of Dál Cais.
- AI1003.8 Repose of Donngal son of Beoán, abbot of Tuaim Gréine.
- AI1020.2 Muiredach Ua hAililléin, lector of Tuaim Gréine, rested in Christ.
- AI1024.8 Niall Ua Cellaig, lector of Tuaim Gréine, rested in Christ.
- AI1026.7 Conall Ua Cillíne, coarb of Crónán of Tuaim Gréine, fell asleep.

== See also ==
- List of towns and villages in Ireland
