= Scarriff =

Village in County Clare, Ireland

Scariff Irish: An Scairbh
- Village
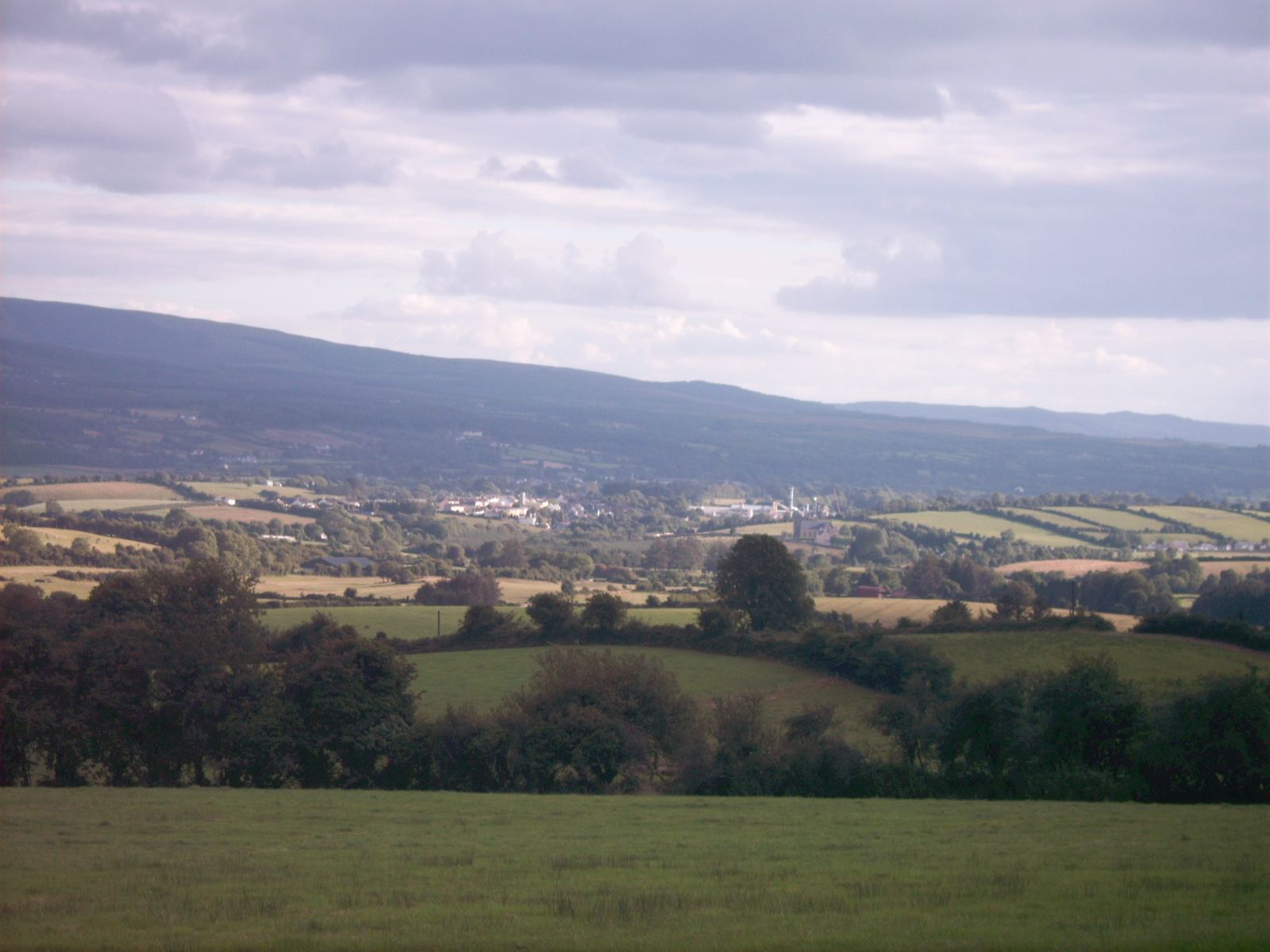

- Location in Ireland
- Coordinates: 52°55′N 8°32′W
- Country: Ireland
- Province: Munster
- County: County Clare

Population (2022) Scarriff-Tuamgraney
  - Total: 854
- Time zone: UTC+0 (WET)
  - Summer (DST): UTC-1 (IST (WEST))
- Irish Grid Reference: R639845

Scarriff or Scariff (Irish: An Scairbh, meaning 'The Rocky Ford') is a large village in east County Clare, in the midwest of Ireland. The town is on the west end of Lough Derg and is best known for its harbour. The Scarriff Market House is easily recognisable, and it is therefore often used to represent the town. For census purposes, Scarriff and neighbouring Tuamgraney form the census settlement of Scarriff-Tuamgraney, which had a population of 854 at the 2022 census.

== Location ==
The name "Scarriff" comes from the Irish "scarbh", which may mean either a shallow, a rocky shore or a rough ford. All of these are appropriate to the early town, which lies at a crossing on the River Graney upstream from its mouth on Lough Derg. In 1831 the town of Scarriff had 120 houses, as well as oil and flour mills. There was one main street running up from the river. The small market town is popular with anglers who fish the Graney, the Shannon and Lough O'Grady, which is two miles west of the town. The town of Scariff is in the Catholic parish of Scariff and Moynoe. Parish churches are the Sacred Heart in Scariff and St Mary's in Clonusker. Scarriff is on the route of the East Clare Way walking trail. Tuamgraney and Inis Cealtra are nearby.

== History ==
Little is known of the Scariff area in pre-Christian times. However, the presence of the remains of a wedge tomb at Cappabane tells us that the area has been inhabited for at least 4,000 years.

The name Scariff is derived from the Gaelic "Scairbh" which means a rocky ford or crossing place. Long before the present town came into being the area was of great strategic importance to those who held the territory about and to those who sought to hold it - the presence of the great river Shannon on the one hand and the mountainous terrain on the other rendered this Scairbh a most important crossing point on a journey north or south.

The name Scariff is first mentioned in 1315 in connection with a battle fought there during the civil wars of the period. The chipboard factory now occupies the site of the conflict. By the end of the fourteenth century, the Scariff area was under the control of the O'Grady clan. To maintain their dominance three castles or fortified houses were built, one at Tuamgraney (which still stands), one near the bridge at the Scairbh which no longer exists and a third, smaller building, at Moynoe. The earliest account of Scariff castle is from 1564.

In 1633 Richard Boyle, 1st Earl of Cork, bought ten quarters of land north of the Graney River, including the castle and ironworks of Scarriff. These lands were combined with the old Moynoe parish to form the Scariff parish. Today Scariff and Moynoe is a parish of the Roman Catholic Diocese of Killaloe. Scariff as a town developed around the castle and its growth was helped by the presence of a smelting furnace which operated there. It is shown on a map of the Down survey in 1655. The town grew gradually in the following centuries, its fortunes generally in line with those of the country as a whole. In penal times Mass was celebrated at the Mass Rock at Cappabane.

Scariff suffered greatly during the Famine in the 19th century. A workhouse was built in 1841 at Drewsboro to provide some relief for the poor, and was opened in May 1842 to accommodate 600 persons. After the famine started in 1845 starving and destitute locals flocked to the workhouse. By 1846 the local graveyard was full with inmates from the workhouse and a new graveyard had to be opened outside Tuamgraney. The following year the workhouse ran out of food, water and clothing for the inmates, who were dying from fever and starvation at the rate of a dozen a day, along with those who were caring for them. The matron, her children and the parish priest, among other carers, died of fever. Even after the famine passed, in 1851, the workhouse had 3,212 inmates. The population in the Workhouse Union district in 1851 was reduced during the famine by more than 50% to 23,057. The East Clare Brigade of the IRA burned the remains of the workhouse down in 1921.

The 20th century however saw the town begin to prosper. New roads were built. It had a bank, a police station, flour mills and a Market House reflecting its growing importance as a market town. As well as improved road connections, the Dock provided vital trade links and Scariff enjoyed its position as the business centre of north-east Clare. Two of the more prominent buildings - the workhouse and the police station - were destroyed in the War of Independence. A large chipboard factory can now be found in Scarriff, but the town no longer has a bakery and the dock no longer operates as in former times. Its role now as a stopping point for pleasure crafts is perhaps indicative of the possibilities which exist for Scariff as a tourist centre.

Scariff is unique in that much of the town is situated across the river Graney in the neighboring parish of Bodyke, which sometimes is confused for the nearby Tuamgraney.

== Education ==
At primary level, the area is served by Scariff National School, catering for nearly all the children in the parish. The local secondary school is Scariff Community College.

== Facilities ==
Scariff acts as the local shopping centre and has several shops, bars and food outlets. There is also a station of the Garda Síochána. The Irish Seed Savers Association is located nearby.

== Sport ==
The camogie and hurling teams are hugely successful with both getting to the semi-finals of the Feile Na nGael.

== Festivals ==
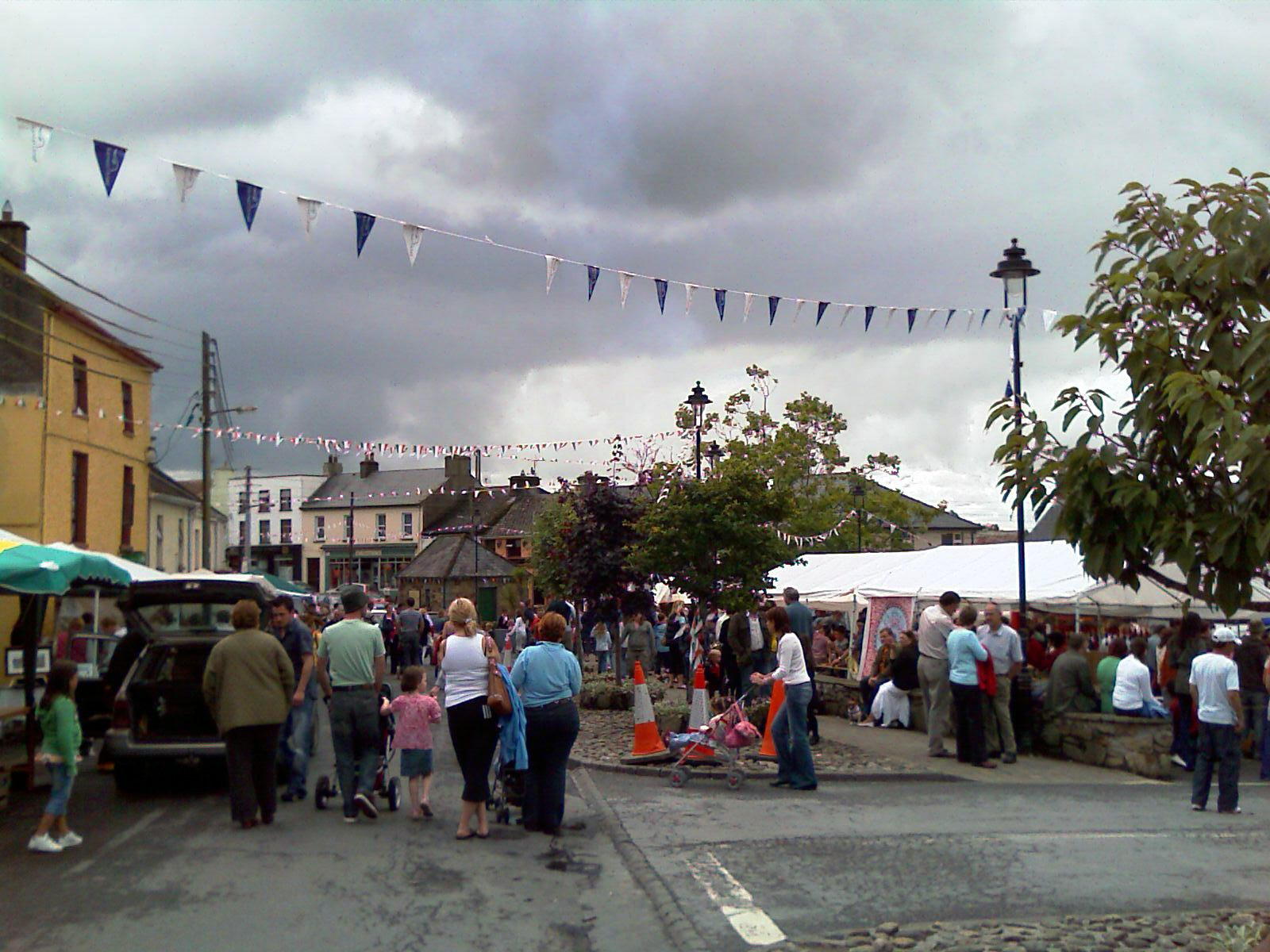
The Scarriff Harbour Festival is the newest of several festivals held in Scarriff.

There are a number of festivals and shows in Scarriff every year, including the Scariff Show (started in 1944), the Scariff Harbour Festival (started in 2003), and the Clare Drama Festival (started in 1947).

== Notable people ==
- Sir Reginald Hart, British Army General and Victoria Cross recipient
- Sarah McTernan, musical artist, represented Ireland at the Eurovision Song Contest 2019
- Eugene Nugent, Roman Catholic prelate and nuncio, born in Gurtaderra

== See also ==
- List of towns and villages in Ireland
- Market Houses in Ireland
- Scariff GAA
