= John O'Molony =

John O'Molony may refer to:

- John O'Molony (1591–1651), Irish Roman Catholic bishop and Irish Confederate
- John O'Molony (1617–1702), Irish Roman Catholic bishop and Jacobite
