= James Dowley =

Styles of James Dowley
- Reference style: The Most Reverend
- Spoken style: My Lord
- Religious style: Bishop

James Dowley (also known as Dooley) (died 1684) was an Irish Roman Catholic prelate who served as the Bishop of Limerick from 1720 to 1737.

== Biography ==
James Dowley studied in Paris during the 1630s. After his return to Limerick as priest he was appointed chancellor and vicar-general by bishop O'Dwyer. After the 1651 Siege of Limerick he escaped to Spain. He remained in the service of Baltasar Cardinal Moscoso y Sandoval. In Toledo he came to know the Kerry Dominican and distinguished historian Dominic O'Daly OP. he gave a first hand account of the siege to O'Daly. Dowley moved to Rome in 1655 where he unsuccessfully sought the office of Vicar Apostolic of Limerick. Instead he became rector of the College of the Neophytes. Amongst the distinguished Irish ecclesiastics present in Rome at this time were Oliver Plunkett and John Brennan.

On 19 1669 Dowley was appointed Vicar Apostolic of Limerick. Despite initial hesitation about the appointment which was expressed to William Burgat the clergy of the diocese accepted Dowley. After his arrival in the diocese he endeavoured to visit every church and sent a report to Rome. The diocese was judged to be in good shape despite not having a bishop for fifteen years. Dowley was consecrated bishop on 19 August 1677 with the principal consecrator being his old Roman friend John Brenan who assisted by Bishop Creagh of Cork and James Phelan of Ossory. Dowley's episcopate was dominated by the so-called Popish Plot a period of anti-Catholic hysteria that made any activity as a bishop dangerous. In 1678 he was released by the authorities under surety due to his ill health but he continued to act as bishop throughout. he died in 1684.

Catholic Church titles
Preceded by Edmund O'Dwyer	Bishop of Limerick; 1677 – 1684	Succeeded by John O'Molony
