= Wibald (given name) =

Wibald or Wibold is a masculine given name. Notable people with the name include:

- Wibald (bishop of Auxerre) (died 887), bishop of Auxerre
- Wibold (bishop of Cambrai) (died 966), bishop of Cambrai
- Wibald of Stavelot (died 1158), abbot of Stavelot (Stablo) and Corvey
