= Wibald (bishop of Auxerre) =

Wibald (died 887) was the bishop of Auxerre from 879 until his death.

According to the Gesta pontificum Autissiodorensium, Wibald was a Frank from Cambrai. His parents were Leutfrid and Doda. He studied the liberal arts under John Scotus Eriugena in the palace school (aula regia) of King Charles the Bald after 847. He also entered the royal service under King Louis the Stammerer. In 879, the king engineered his promotion to the vacant bishopric of Auxerre. He was ordained on 5 April by Archbishop Ansegisus of Sens.

According to the Gesta, Wibald added two altars to cathedral of Saint Stephen. He also obtained a royal order placing the abbey of Saint Julian under the authority of the cathedral, although it never came into effect because of his early death. He set aside half of the village of Chichery to endow the annual celebration of four feasts in memory of his ordination, his death, the death of King Louis and the dedication of the two new altars.

Wibald died on 12 May 887 in the church of Saint Clement. Although his wish was to be buried in his home, he was buried in Saint Clement.

== Bibliography ==
- Holtz, Louis (1991), "L'école d'Auxerre", in Dominique Iogna-Prat; Colette Jeudy; Guy Lobrichon (eds.), L'École carolingienne d'Auxerre: De Murethach à Rémi, 830–908, Beauchesne, pp. 131–146
- McKitterick, Rosamond (1983). The Frankish Kingdoms under the Carolingians, 751–987. London: Longman.
- Sassier, Yves (1991), "Les Carolingiens et Auxerre", in Dominique Iogna-Prat; Colette Jeudy; Guy Lobrichon (eds.), L'École carolingienne d'Auxerre: De Murethach à Rémi, 830–908, Beauchesne, pp. 21–36
- Sot, Michel; Lobrichon, Guy, eds. (2002). Les gestes des évêques d'Auxerre. Vol. 1. Les Belles Lettres.
