= Aaron of Auxerre =

Blessed Aaron of Auxerre
- Died: ca. 807; Auxerre, France
- Venerated in: Roman Catholic Church (Archdiocese of Sens)
- Feast: 28 September

Aaron of Auxerre (fl. 800) was a bishop of Auxerre (perhaps 794–807). His relics are venerated in the Church of Saint-Germain in Auxerre, where his feast day is celebrated on 28 September.

He is included in the roster of saints in the book Les Petits Bollandistes.
