= John Brenan (bishop) =

Roman Catholic prelate

Most Reverend John Brenan
- Archbishop of Cashel
- Church: Catholic Church
- Archdiocese: Archdiocesep of Cashel
- In office: 1677–1693
- Predecessor: William Burgat
- Successor: Edward Comerford
- Previous post: Bishop of Waterford and Lismore (1671–1677)

Orders
- Consecration: 6 September 1671 by Francesco Maria Brancaccio

Personal details
- Died: 1693 Cashel, County Tipperary, Ireland

John Brenan (died 1693) was a Roman Catholic prelate who served as Archbishop of Cashel (1677–1693) and Bishop of Waterford and Lismore (1671–1677).

== Biography ==
On 19 August 1671, John Brenan was appointed during the papacy of Pope Clement X as Bishop of Waterford and Lismore. On 6 September 1671, he was consecrated bishop by Francesco Maria Brancaccio, Cardinal-Bishop of Porto e Santa Rufina, with Stefano Brancaccio, Bishop of Viterbo e Tuscania, and Federico Baldeschi Colonna, Titular Archbishop of Caesarea in Cappadocia, serving as co-consecrators. On 8 March 1677, he was appointed during the papacy of Pope Innocent XI as Archbishop of Cashel. He served as Archbishop of Cashel until his death in 1693. While bishop, he was the principal consecrator of James Dowley, Bishop of Limerick (1679); and the principal co-consecrator of Thaddeus Keogh, Bishop of Clonfert (1671).

== See also ==
- Catholic Church in Ireland

Catholic Church titles
Preceded by Patrick Comerford	Bishop of Waterford and Lismore; 1671–1677	Succeeded by Richard Piers
Preceded by William Burgat	Archbishop of Cashel; 1677–1693	Succeeded by Edward Comerford
