= Cornelius O'Keeffe =

Irish bishop

Styles of Cornelius O'Keeffe
- Reference style: The Most Reverend
- Spoken style: My Lord
- Religious style: Bishop

Cornelius O'Keeffe (Irish: Cornelius Ó Caoimh); c. 1670–4 May 1737) was an Irish Roman Catholic prelate who served as the Bishop of Limerick from 1720 to 1737.

== Biography ==
O'Keeffe's family had been expelled from their property at Glanville during the 1650s, eventually settling at Drumkeene, County Limerick, where he was born. His parents were Honor O'Daly and "Dionysii" O'Keeffe, and he was the youngest of six boys. The family descendants were in Templeglantine until the 1950s' and claimed The Fermoy O'Keeffe Chieftains connection right up to the end.

He received the tonsure at the hands of the Archbishop of Bordeaux on 29 March 1686, having studied at Bruges or Toulouse, or both.

He was listed as an Irish exile in Brittany in 1710, when he was nominated for the rectorship of St. Similien's parish, Nantes. He stayed there for ten years before returning to Ireland on his appointment as bishop of the Diocese of Limerick by papal brief on 7 March [O.S. 25 February] 1720, succeeding John O'Molony. In common with all Irish bishops of his day he was nominated by James III.

The O'Keeffe Chalice, dating from about 1735, was made for him. He was succeeded by Robert Lacy.

Catholic Church titles
Preceded by John O'Molony	Bishop of Limerick; 7 March 1720 – 4 May 1737	Succeeded by Robert Lacy
