= John O'Molony (1591–1651) =

Irish Catholic bishop (1591–1651)

The Most Reverend John O'Molony D.D.
- Bishop of Killaloe
- Church: Roman Catholic
- Diocese: Killaloe
- Appointed: 1630
- Term ended: 1651
- Predecessor: Malachy Ó Caollaidhe
- Successor: John O'Molony

Orders
- Ordination: c.1611
- Consecration: 1630

Personal details
- Born: 1591 County Clare, Kingdom of Ireland
- Died: 1651 (aged 59–60) Limerick, Kingdom of Ireland
- Education: College of Sorbonne

John O'Molony (1591 – 1651) was an Irish Roman Catholic prelate who was Bishop of Killaloe from 1630. He was a prominent supporter of the Irish Confederacy during the Irish Confederate Wars.

== Early life ==
O'Molony was the eldest son of John O'Molony of Thomond. He was educated by Alexander Lynch and Anthony Lynch, Bishop of Kilfenora, in Ireland. He studied for the priesthood at the College of Sorbonne in Paris, later graduating as a Doctor of Divinity. He was awarded the chair of philosophy at the Collège des Grassins in 1615, where he lectured for the following five years. He was appointed a procurator at the Sorbonne in 1620, before returning to Ireland in around 1625.

== Bishop of Killaloe ==
In 1630, O'Molony was appointed Bishop of Killaloe following the intercession of Marie de' Medici, who secured his consecration in preference to the other candidate, Malachy Ó Caollaidhe. He was consecrated in Paris by the bishop of Auxerre, and began his episcopal work in 1631. He was subjected to accusations of financial and moral impropriety, allegations that were ultimately dismissed by Rome. O'Molony was also in dispute with Thomas Walsh for several years, although the two men were reconciled by 1639.

== Irish Confederate Wars ==
On 10 May 1642, O'Molony attended the synod at Kilkenny where he assisted in drafting the Confederate Oath of Association. He was subsequently a member of the four Confederate general assemblies. He actively supported the Irish Confederacy's military effort by financing soldiers and contributing to the war chest from his own diocese. He sided with the Papal Nuncio, Giovanni Battista Rinuccini, in rejecting the first peace orchestrated by the Marquess of Ormond in 1646. O'Molony later attended a meeting in August 1650 that promulgated decrees repudiating the authority of Ormond. Soon after this, he was captured at Quin, County Clare, having raised a troop of men to attack Ormond while he was in Clare. He was released and travelled to Limerick, where he preached and tended to the inhabitants for six months during the Siege of Limeric. Due to his actions, he was one of three bishops exempted from pardon upon the surrender of Limerick.

O'Molony caught the plague on 27 October 1651, on the day the terms of surrender of Limerick were signed, and died shortly afterwards. He was the uncle of the Jacobite clergyman, John O'Molony, who succeeded him as bishop of Killaloe.

Catholic Church titles
Preceded by Malachy Ó Caollaidhe	Bishop of Killaloe; 1630–1651	Succeeded by John O'Molony
