= Angelelmus =

9th-century Bavarian bishop

Saint Angelelmus

Bishop of Auxerre
- Died: 828
- Venerated in: Roman Catholic Church, Eastern Orthodox Church
- Canonized: Pre-congregation
- Feast: 7 July

Angelelmus (Angelelme, Angelaume, died 828) was bishop of Auxerre from 813 to 828. He was Bavarian, and became abbot of the monastery of SS Gervais and Protase, Auxerre.

He is a Catholic and Orthodox saint, with feast day on July 7.
