= Pierre de Broc =

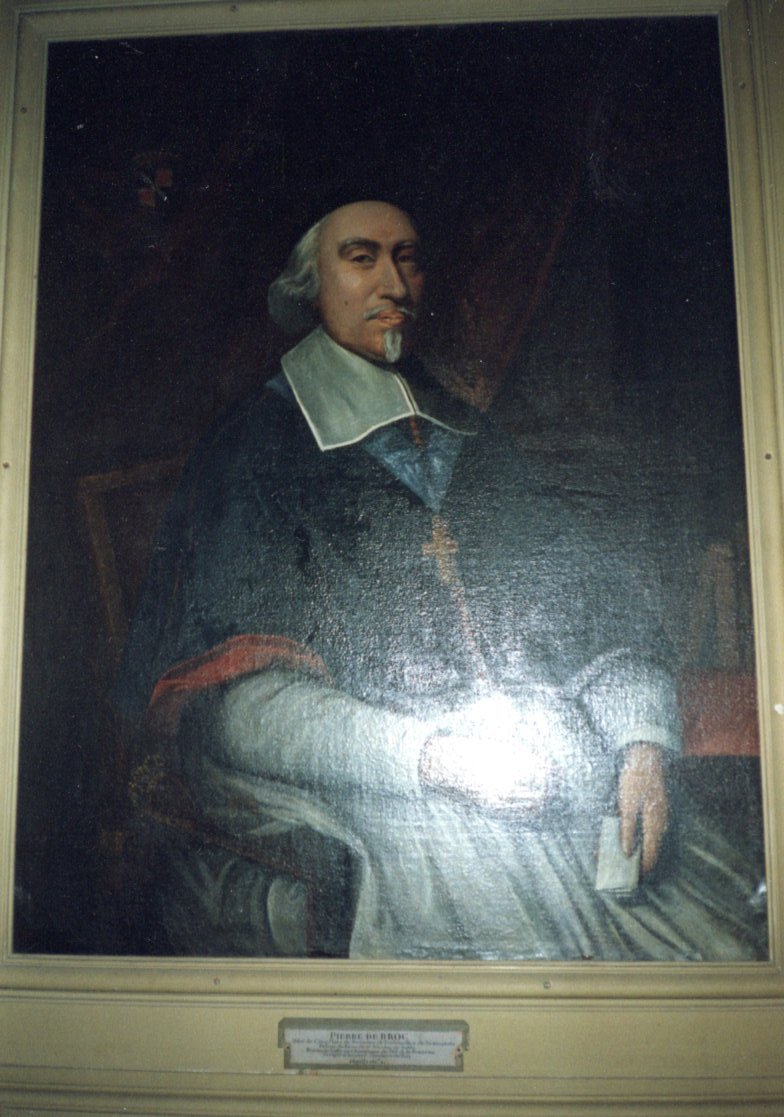
- Pierre de Broc
- Born: Château de Courtalain
- Died: 7 July 1671; Château de Régennes
- Occupation: Bishops in the Catholic Church (1640–)
- Position held: Roman Catholic Bishop of Auxerre (1637–)

Pierre de Broc (7 June 1601–7 July 1671) was Bishop of Auxerre from 1640 to 1671.

== See also ==
- Roman Catholic Diocese of Auxerre
