= Roman Catholic Diocese of Auxerre =

Former French Roman Catholic diocese

Coordinates: 47.7979°N 3.5729°E

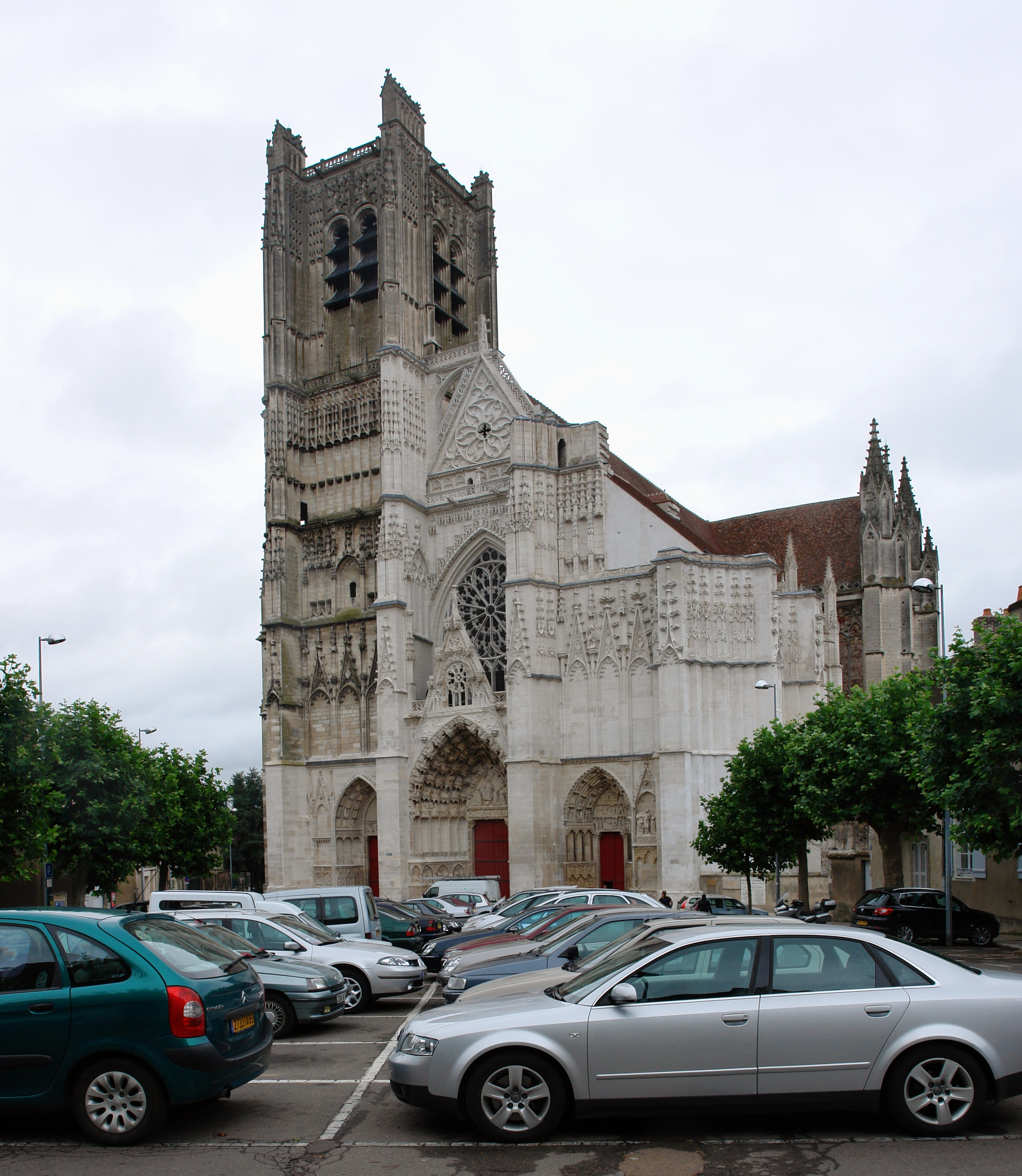
Auxerre Cathedral

The diocese of Auxerre (Latin: dioecesis Antissiodorensis) is a former French Roman Catholic diocese. Its historical episcopal see was in the city of Auxerre in Burgundy, now part of eastern France. Currently the non-metropolitan Archbishop of Sens, ordinary of the diocese of Sens and Auxerre, resides in Auxerre.

== Ecclesiastical history ==
The Gesta pontificum Autissiodorensium, (Note: Variants of the title: Gesta pontificum Altissiodorensium (Latin); Gestes des évêques d'Auxerre (French)) written about 875 by the canons Rainogala and Alagus, and later continued up to 1278, gives a list of bishops of Auxerre. Louis Duchesne regards the list as mostly accurate, but very arbitrary in its dates prior to the 7th century. Auxerre is remarkable among French churches for the number of its bishops who have come to be regarded as saints.

=== Bishops of the original Gesta ===
Peregrine of Auxerre (Pélérin 'pilgrim') was the founder of the See of Auxerre; according to the legend, he was sent by Pope Sixtus II and was martyred under Emperor Diocletian in 303 or 304.

After Peregrine, the original 870s Gesta list:

- Marcellianus
- Valerianus
- Helladius (d. 387)
- Amator (d. 418), who had been ordained deacon and tonsured by Helladius and who thus affords the earliest example of ecclesiastical tonsure mentioned in the religious history of France
- Germanus (418–448), to whom the abbey in Auxerre is dedicated
- Allodius
- Fratemus
- Censurius, to whom about 475 the priest Constantius sent the Life of St. Germain
- Ursus
- Theodosius, who assisted in 511 at the First Council of Orléans
- Gregorius
- Optatus
- Droctoaldus
- Eleutherius, who assisted at four Councils of Orléans between 533 and 549
- Romanus (†ca. 564)
- Actherius
- Aunacharius (Aunaire; 573–603), uncle of Lupus, Archbishop of Sens who held the Council of Auxerre which illustrated the customs among both the newly converted Teutonic tribes and their Gallo-Roman neighbours
- Desiderius (Didier)
- Palladius, who assisted at several councils in 627, 650 and 654
- Vigilius, who was assassinated about 684
- Tetricius (692–707)
- Savaric (710–715)
- Aidulf (perhaps 751–766)
- Maurin (perhaps 766–794)
- Aaron (perhaps 794–807)
- Angelelmus (807–828)
- Heribaldus (829–857), first chaplain of Louis the Pious, and several times given ambassadorial charges
- Abbo (857–869)
- Christian (860–871)

=== Later bishops ===
- Wala (872–879)
- Wibaldus (879–887)
- Herifridus (887–909)
- St Géran (909–914)
- St Betto (933–961)
- Guy (933–961)
- Heribert I (971-996)
- John (996–999)
- Hugh of Chalon (999–1030)
- Heribert II (1039-1052)
- Geoffrey of Champallemand (1052-1076)
- Robert of Nevers (1076-1092)
- Humbaud (1095–1114), drowned on the way to Jerusalem
- St Hugues de Montaigu (1116–1136), a friend of St. Bernard
- Hugues de Mâcon (1137–1151), Abbot of Pontigny, often charged by Pope Eugenius III with adjusting differences and re-establishing order in monasteries
- Alanus (1152–1167), author of a life of St. Bernard
- Guillaume de Toucy (1167–1181), the first French bishop who went to Rome to acknowledge the authority of Pope Alexander III.
- Hugues de Noyers (1183–1206), known as the "hammer of heretics" for the vigour with which he sought out in his diocese the sects of the Albigenses and the "Caputiés" (mainly in Sens)
- Guillaume de Seignelay (1207–1220), who took part in the war against the Albigenses and in 1220 became the bishop of Paris
- Henry of Villeneuve (1220–1235)
- Bernard de Sully (1235–1244)
- Guy de Mello (1247–1270), who was Apostolic delegate in the crusade of Charles of Anjou against Manfred
- Gerard de Lessines (1271-1278), Cardinal-bishop of Palestrina
- Guillaume III de Grez (1278-1295)
- Pierre de Mornay (1296–1306), who negotiated between Pope Boniface VIII and king Philip IV and in 1304 became chancellor of France
- Pierre de Cros (1349–1351), cardinal in 1350
- Jean Germain (1361–1362)
- Pierre de Longueil (1449–1474)
- Enguerrand Signart (1474–1477)
- John III Baillet (1477–1513)
- François de Dinteville (1513–1530)
- François de Dinteville II (1530–1554)
- Robert de Lenoncourt (1554–1560), cardinal in 1538
- Philippe de Lenoncourt (1560–1562), cardinal in 1586
- Philibert Babou de la Bourdaisière (1562–1570), cardinal in 1561
- Jacques Amyot the scholar (1571–1593), translator of the works of Plutarch and Diodorus Siculus, tutor of Charles IX, grand almoner of kings Charles IX and Henry III
- François de Donadieu (1599–1625)
- Gilles de Souvré (1625–1631)
- Dominique Séguier (1631–1637)
- Pierre de Broc (1640–1671)
- Nicolas Colbert (1672–1676)
- André Colbert (1676–1704)
- Charles de Caylus (1704–1754), who made his diocese a centre of Jansenism and whose published works in four volumes were condemned by Rome in 1754.

On November 29, 1801, the diocese of Auxerre was suppressed. On October 7, 1817, it was restored, but in 1821 it was suppressed again. On June 3, 1823, it was united once more to the diocese of Sens. The newly united diocese soon became an archdiocese, but after many years, in 2006, which in turn lost its Metropolitan status in 2006 and became a suffragan see of the Ecclesiastical Province of the Dijon.

The Cathedral of Auxerre, completed in 1178, contains numerous sculptures in the Byzantine style.

== See also ==
- Catholic Church in France
- List of Catholic dioceses in France

== Bibliography ==
- Gams, Pius Bonifatius (1873). Series episcoporum Ecclesiae catholicae: quotquot innotuerunt a beato Petro apostolo. Ratisbon: Typis et Sumptibus Georgii Josephi Manz.
- Eubel, Conradus, ed. (1913). Hierarchia catholica, Tomus 1 (second ed.). Münster: Libreria Regensbergiana. pp. 72–73. (in Latin)
- Eubel, Conradus, ed. (1914). Hierarchia catholica, Tomus 2 (second ed.). Münster: Libreria Regensbergiana. pp. 80–81.
- Gulik, Guilelmus (1923). Eubel, Conradus (ed.). Hierarchia catholica, Tomus 3 (second ed.). Münster: Libreria Regensbergiana. pp. 95–96.
- Gauchat, Patritius (Patrice) (1935). Hierarchia catholica IV (1592-1667). Münster: Libraria Regensbergiana. p. 70.
- Ritzler, Remigius; Sefrin, Pirminus (1952). Hierarchia catholica medii et recentis aevi V (1667-1730). Patavii: Messagero di S. Antonio. p. 70.
- Ritzler, Remigius; Sefrin, Pirminus (1958). Hierarchia catholica medii et recentis aevi VI (1730-1799). Patavii: Messagero di S. Antonio. p. 67.
