= William Burgat =

Irish Roman Catholic archbishop

- Archbishop of Cashel
- Church: Catholic Church
- Archdiocese: Archdiocese of Cashel
- In office: 8 March 1669 – 27 April 1675
- Predecessor: Gerald Fitzgerald
- Successor: John Brenan
- Previous post: Vicar Apostolic of Cashel (1657-1669)

Orders
- Consecration: August 1669 by Hardouin de Péréfixe de Beaumont

Personal details
- Died: 27 April 1675

Styles of William Burgat
- Reference style: The Most Reverend
- Spoken style: Your Grace
- Religious style: Archbishop

William Burgat (died 1675) was an Irish Roman Catholic prelate who served as the Archbishop of Cashel from 1669 to 1675.

He was appointed the Vicar Apostolic of Emly on 17 April 1657 and Vicar Apostolic of Elphin on 24 November 1665. A few years later, he was appointed the Archbishop of the Metropolitan see of Cashel on 31 January 1669. His papal brief was issued on 8 March 1669 and consecrated in France circa August 1669. As Archbishop of Cashel, he continued to administer the Episcopal see of Emly as Apostolic Administrator.

He died in office on 27 April 1675.

== Notes ==
Catholic Church titles
Vacant Title last held by Terence Albert O'Brien as Bishop of Emly	Vicar Apostolic of Emly; 1657–1669	Emly was then administer by the Archbishops of Cashel until it was united with Cashel in 1718
Vacant Title last held by Boetius Egan as Bishop of Elphin	Vicar Apostolic of Elphin; 1665–1669	Vacant Title next held by Dominic de Burgo as Bishop of Elphin
Preceded by Gerard Fitzgerald as Vicar Apostolic of Cashel	Archbishop of Cashel; 1669–1675	Vacant Title next held by John Brenan (archbishop) as Archbishop of Cashel
