= Desiderius of Auxerre =

French bishop and saint (d. 621)

Desiderius of Auxerre (died 621) was bishop of Auxerre, in France, from 614 to 621. He was from Aquitaine, and is mentioned in the Gesta pontificum Autissiodorensium, as well as the Chronicle of Fredegar.

He is known for his large bequest to his church, St. Stephen's, of 300 pounds of rich liturgical vessels. These objects were stolen in 1567. His wealth probably came from a noble background; he is thought to have been a kinsman of Queen Brunhild.

He is a Catholic saint, whose feast day is 19 October.
