= John O'Molony (1617–1702) =

Irish Catholic bishop (1617–1702)

The Most Reverend John O'Molony D.D.
- Bishop of Limerick
- Church: Roman Catholic
- Diocese: Limerick
- Appointed: 1688
- Term ended: 3 September 1702
- Predecessor: James Dowley
- Successor: Cornelius O'Keeffe
- Previous post: Bishop of Killaloe

Orders
- Ordination: 1642
- Consecration: 6 March 1671

Personal details
- Born: 1617 Kiltannon, County Clare, Kingdom of Ireland
- Died: 3 September 1702 (aged 84–85) Issy-les-Moulineaux, Paris, France
- Buried: Collège des Lombard, Paris, France
- Education: College of Sorbonne

John O'Molony (1617 – 3 September 1702) was an Irish Roman Catholic prelate who served as Bishop of Killaloe from 1671 and as Bishop of Limerick during the Williamite War in Ireland. He was a Jacobite who spent much of his life in France, where he lived in exile throughout the final decade of his life.

== Early life ==
O'Malony was born at Kiltannon, County Clare, the son of Thomas O'Molony and Anne McMahon. From the age of 13 was he raised in the household of his uncle, Bishop John O'Molony (1591–1651).

He was ordained as a priest by John de Burgh in 1642. In the autumn of that year, he entered the University of Paris, later graduating with a master's degree and a doctorate of theology, and becoming a Doctor of Divinity at the College of Sorbonne. During the 1640s and 1650s in Paris, O'Malony became involved in several religious-political disputes, particularly relating to the activity of Irish students at the university. During the 1650s he was also a regular visitor to the court of the exiled Queen of England, Henrietta Maria, and attended the court of Louis XIV. In 1658 he was first nominated for the bishopric of Killaloe, with support from the local Irish Catholic gentry. In 1667, he was attached to a canonry in Rouen.

== Bishop of Killaloe ==
On 6 March 1671, he was consecrated as Bishop of Killaloe and he returned to Ireland in August of that year. In late 1673 he was nominated by Irish bishops to establish an Irish theological college abroad, and O'Malony moved again to France to petition Jean-Baptiste Colbert. His efforts were successful and in 1677 the Irish College in Paris received a charter from Louis XIV.

In 1677, O'Molony returned to Ireland under the patronage of James, Duke of York. O'Molony was soon suspected of complicity in the Popish Plot, and in 1679 he withdrew to rural Connaught for his safety; a £150 bounty had been offered for his capture. In June 1681 he left in secret for France.

== Bishop of Limerick ==
The accession of James II to the throne enabled O'Molony to return to Ireland in 1685. On 1 May 1687, he participated in the consecration of Ferdinando d'Adda at St James's Palace, London. In 1687 he was appointed administrator of the Roman Catholic Diocese of Limerick and the following year he was made Bishop of Limerick upon James II's recommendation to Pope Innocent XI. In 1689 he condemned the failure of James's Jacobite Patriot Parliament to repeal Poynings' Law. He remained in Limerick during the first Siege of Limerick in 1690. Upon the lifting of the siege, he left the city for France as part of a delegation sent by James II to request further French support for the war. He never returned to Ireland.

Throughout the 1690s, O'Molony remained in France and was in receipt of a clerical pension from the French king. In the early 1690s, the English government identified him as a likely Jacobite conspirator. In 1691 he subscribed to a letter written by the Irish episcopate to the pope, seeking support for the Jacobite cause.

O'Molony died in 1702 at Issy-les-Moulineaux, Paris. He was buried in the Collège des Lombards. In his will he left 1,200 livres for a new Irish college in Paris, 300 livres for the support of students in the Collège des Lombards, and six bursaries for Irish students in the Lycée Louis-le-Grand.

Catholic Church titles
Preceded by James Dowley	Bishop of Limerick; 1688–1702	Succeeded by Cornelius O'Keeffe
Preceded by Denis Harty	Bishop of Killaloe; 1671–1702	Succeeded by Eustace Browne
