= Thomas Walsh (archbishop of Cashel) =

Archbishop of Cashel

Styles of Thomas Walsh
- Reference style: The Most Reverend
- Spoken style: Your Grace
- Religious style: Archbishop

Thomas Walsh born in Waterford, Ireland in 1580 - died in Santiago de Compostela, Spain in 1654; was an Irish prelate of the Roman Catholic Church. He served as the Archbishop of Cashel from 1626 to 1654.

He was appointed the archbishop of the Metropolitan see of Cashel on 27 April 1626 and consecrated in the Spanish Netherlands on 8 July 1626, After the siege of Limerick in 1651, the archbishop was compelled to go into exile. and ordained at Ordained Bishop S. Isidore, Church, Rome.

Walsh died in exile on 5 May 1654. On 6 May 1654 he was buried with great ceremony in the Santiago de Compostela Cathedral next to the Chapel of the Kings and Relics.

== Bibliography ==
- Brady, W. Maziere (1876). The Episcopal Succession in England, Scotland and Ireland, A.D. 1400 to 1875. Vol. 2. Rome: Tipografia Della Pace.
- Fryde, E. B.; Greenway, D. E.; Porter, S.; Roy, I., eds. (1986). Handbook of British Chronology (3rd, reprinted 2003 ed.). Cambridge: Cambridge University Press. ISBN 0-521-56350-X.

Catholic Church titles
Preceded by David Kearney (archbishop)	Archbishop of Cashel; 1626–1654	Succeeded by John de Burgo (vicar apostolic)
