= Dermot O'Hurley =

Roman Catholic Archbishop of Cashel

The Most Reverend Dermot O'Hurley
- Archbishop of Cashel
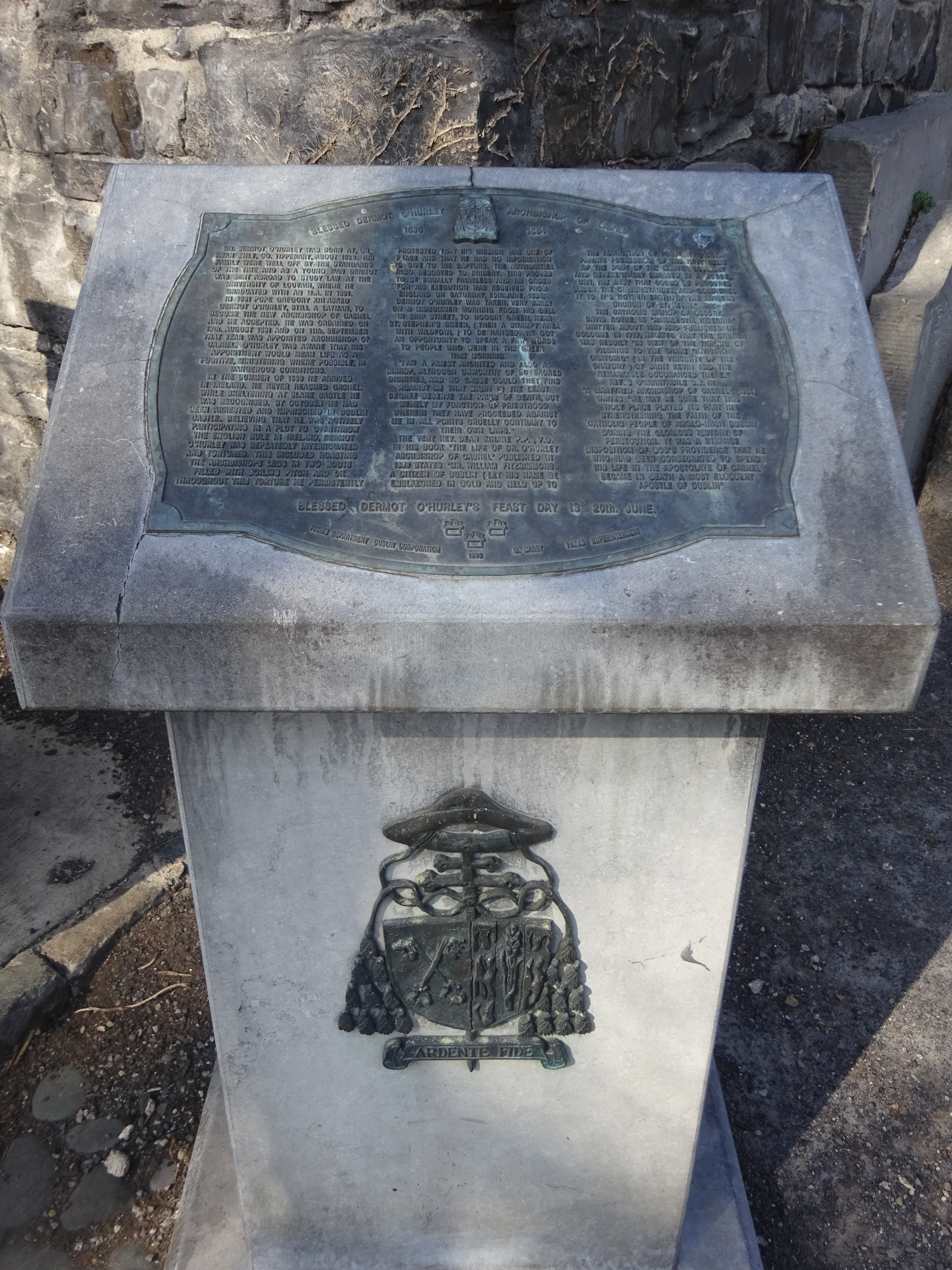
- Memorial plaque at St. Kevin's Church, Camden Row, Dublin
- Archdiocese: Cashel
- Appointed: September 1581
- Term ended: 19 or 20 June 1584
- Predecessor: Maurice MacGibbon
- Successor: David Kearney

Orders
- Ordination: 9 September 1581
- Consecration: 10 September 1581 by Pope Gregory XIII

Personal details
- Born: c. 1530 Lickadoon Castle, Lickadoon, Ballyneety, County Limerick, Lordship of Ireland
- Died: 19 or 20 June 1584 Dublin, Ireland
- Buried: St. Kevin's Church, Camden Row, Dublin, Ireland
- Denomination: Roman Catholic
- Parents: William O'Hurley
- Education: University of Leuven

Sainthood
- Feast day: 20 June
- Venerated in: Ireland
- Title as Saint: Blessed
- Beatified: 27 September 1992; Vatican City by Pope John Paul II
- Shrines: St. Kevin's Church, Camden Row, Dublin, Ireland

Dermot O'Hurley (c. 1530 – 19 or 20 June 1584)—also Dermod or Dermond O'Hurley: Irish: Diarmaid Ó hUrthuile—was the Roman Catholic Archbishop of Cashel in Ireland during the reign of Elizabeth I, who was put to death for treason. He was one of the most celebrated of the Irish Catholic Martyrs, and was beatified by Pope John Paul II on 27 September 1992.

== Biography ==
=== Early life ===
O'Hurley was born in Lickadoon Castle, Ballyneety, County Limerick, around the year 1530. His father, William, was the O'Hurley clan's Chief of the Name and steward to James FitzGerald, 14th Earl of Desmond. The O'Hurley clan claims descent from the Dál gCais, one of the more powerful Irish clans in Munster's history.

O'Hurley was educated by tutors and then sent to Flemish Brabant to study at the University of Leuven. In 1551 he graduated with a Master of Arts degree, then a doctorate of Law and was appointed a professor of philosophy in one of that university's greater colleges, where he remained for 15 years. In 1574 he was appointed a professor of canon and civil law in the Faculty of Law of Reims University, at which he spent 4 years.

=== Fugitive archbishop ===
In 1570 Pope Pius V excommunicated Queen Elizabeth I of England in the papal bull Regnans in Excelsis. This led to the Second Desmond Rebellion in 1579–83, which was still in progress when O'Hurley was required to travel to Ireland. On 11 September 1581, while still a layman, he was appointed Archbishop of Cashel by Pope Gregory XIII. He was ordained and consecrated and set out on his mission in 1583. O'Hurley's voyage was fraught with danger because of the state of war between the Pope and England, but he accepted the risks involved and arranged for a sea captain from Drogheda to smuggle him into Ireland. He disembarked on Holmpatrick Strand in County Dublin in the autumn of 1583. His letters, which had been sent via a different ship, were intercepted by priest hunters.

Through its elaborate spy system, the government in Dublin had knowledge of Dermot's appointment to the See of Cashel, and Elizabeth's spies were soon on his tracks. He never reached Cashel. O'Hurley lodged with Thomas Fleming, 10th Baron Slane, at Slane, and from there he spread his activities through the territory of the O'Reilly clan. While sheltering at Slane Castle he was recognised. Under pain of severe penalties, Fleming was ordered to arrest O'Hurley who had by then left Slane. O'Hurley was arrested at Carrick-on-Suir in September 1583, while staying with Thomas Butler, 10th Earl of Ormond, a Protestant, referred to as dubh (the black), who was the Lord Treasurer of Ireland at the time. Butler was much offended and distressed at the arrest, and afterwards did his best to rescue O'Hurley from the executioners. On 8 October 1583 O'Hurley was imprisoned in Dublin Castle.

=== Martyrdom ===
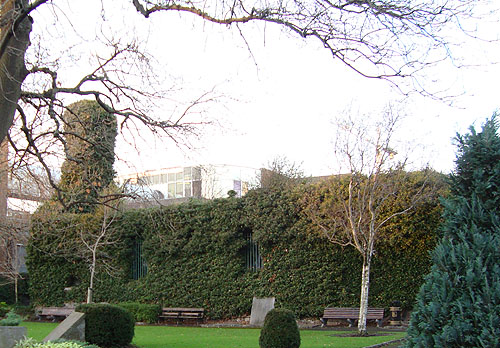
St. Kevin's in Camden Row, burial place of O'Hurley

O'Hurley was subjected to savage torture, including the boiling boot, in which his bare feet were imprisoned in iron boots, filled with water, that were slowly heated over a gentle fire until the water boiled and consumed both flesh and bone. Yet, O'Hurley refused to embrace Protestantism. According to surviving correspondence between Dublin and Whitehall, Elizabeth I was reluctant to dispense with a fair trial under English Law, but her mind was changed by Sir Francis Walsingham and she approved of a trial by military tribunal. O'Hurley was tried in a day and sentenced to death.

The Chancellor, learning that Butler was coming, by whose influence and power they feared O'Hurley would be saved, determined to put him to death as soon as possible. In the early morning of 19, or 20, June 1584, O'Hurley was taken outside the walls of Dublin and hanged at Hoggen Green. In his last speech, he proclaimed,

Be it therefore known unto you...that I am a priest anointed and also a Bishop, although unworthy of soe sacred dignitites, and noe cause could they find against me that might in the least deserve the paines of death, but merely for my funcon of priesthood wherein they have proceeded against me in all pointes cruelly contrarie to their own lawes ...and I doe injoin you (Deere Christian Brethren) to manifest the same to the world and also to beare witness on the Day of Judgment of my Innocent death, which I indure for my function and profession of the most holy Catholick Faith.

He was buried in St. Kevin's Church, Camden Row, Dublin. His gravesite remained a site of pilgrimage for many years.

== Legacy ==
As word of his execution spread, O'Hurley was immediately revered as a martyr by Catholics throughout Europe. Several accounts of his life and death were printed and reached a wide audience.

Following Catholic Emancipation in 1829, the hierarchy of the Catholic Church in Ireland began an investigation into his life and death. One of the most valuable resources was found to be the documents and letters written by the men who tortured and executed him. In 1904, he was declared a Servant of God.

On 27 September 1992, O'Hurley was beatified by Pope John Paul II, alongside 16 other Irish martyrs.

== See also ==
- Margaret Ball
- Francis Taylor (martyr)

== Sources ==
- "Blessed Dermot O'Hurley". Saints.SQPN.com. Star Quest Production Network. Archived from the original on 4 October 2011.
- Boylan, Henry (1998). A dictionary of Irish biography (3rd ed.). Dublin: Gill and MacMillan. p. 334. ISBN 0-7171-2945-4.
- Brady, W. Maziere (1876). The Episcopal Succession in England, Scotland and Ireland, A.D. 1400 to 1875. Vol. 2. Rome: Tipografia Della Pace.
- Corish, Patrick J.; Millet, Benignus, eds. (2005). "Dermot O'Hurley". The Irish martyrs. Irish theological quarterly monograph series. Vol. 1. Dublin [u.a.]: Four Courts Press. pp. 66–80. ISBN 9781851828586.
- Fryde, E. B.; Greenway, D. E.; Porter, S.; Roy, I., eds. (1986). Handbook of British Chronology (3rd, reprinted 2003 ed.). Cambridge: Cambridge University Press. ISBN 0-521-56350-X.
- McNeill, Charles (1911). "Dermond O'Hurley". In Herbermann, Charles (ed.). Catholic Encyclopedia. Vol. 11. New York: Robert Appleton Company.
- Moody, T. W.; Martin, F. X.; Byrne, F. J., eds. (1984). Maps, genealogies, lists: a companion to Irish History, part II. New History of Ireland. Vol. 11. Oxford: Oxford University Press. ISBN 0-19-821745-5.
- O'Doherty, James (June 2005). "Dermot O'Hurley, a hero of his time". news4.ie. Dublin: NewsFour. Archived from the original on 19 November 2007.
- O'Sullivan-Beare, Philip (1903). "Dermot O'Hurley, Archbishop of Cashel, the most unconquerable and illustrious Martyr". In Byrne, Matthew J. (ed.). Ireland under Elizabeth : chapters towards a history of Ireland in the reign of Elizabeth being a portion of the history of Catholic Ireland. Translated by Matthew J. Byrne. Dublin: Sealy, Bryers & Walker. pp. 33–36. OCLC 808171203. Archived from the original on 24 October 2014 – via electronic edition compiled by Benjamin Hazard. Published 2008. CELT: Corpus of Electronic Texts.
