= Michael Slattery (bishop) =

Irish Roman Catholic clergyman

The Most Reverend Michael Slattery
- Archbishop of Cashel & Emly
- Church: Roman Catholic Church
- Archdiocese: Cashel and Emly
- Elected: 26 November 1833
- Term ended: 4 February 1857
- Predecessor: Robert Laffan
- Successor: Patrick Leahy
- Other posts: College professor & President
- Previous post: President of the St Patrick's College, Maynooth

Orders
- Ordination: 1809
- Consecration: 24 February 1834 by John Murphy, Bishop of Cork

Personal details
- Born: circa 1784 Tipperary
- Died: 4 February 1857 Thurles
- Denomination: Roman Catholic
- Education: Trinity College Dublin; St. Patrick's, Carlow College

Michael Slattery (1783–1857) was a Roman Catholic clergyman who served as the Archbishop of Cashel & Emly from 1833 to 1857.

He was born at Tipperary town in Ireland in 1783, and was educated at the Abbey School there. He entered Trinity College Dublin when only fifteen years of age, one of the first Catholics to do so, earning a Bachelor of Arts degree in 1804.

He then decided to become a Roman Catholic priest, and was enrolled at the St. Patrick's, Carlow College. He was ordained in 1809, and continued at Carlow as a professor of philosophy and of Moral Theology.

As a priest, Father Slattery served the parishes of Ulla in County Limerick for two years, and Borrisoleigh in County Tipperary for over twenty years.

In 1832 he we elected president of the St Patrick's College, Maynooth; in 1833 he was elected to succeed Archbishop Robert Laffan as head of the Roman Catholic Archdiocese of Cashel and Emly, and was installed at Thurles Cathedral on 24 February 1834.

Slattery was a moderate Nationalist and supported Daniel O'Connell, but also spoke out against more militant nationalism.

In 1842 Slattery established a foreign mission department in St. Patrick's College, Thurles.

Archbishop Slattery died at Thurles on 4 February 1857.

== The Michael Slattery Lecture Series ==
The Michael Slattery Lectures series is held by Carlow College in association with Trinity College Dublin, recognising his connection to both institutions. Participants from the Departments of History, English, History of Art and Architecture from Trinity and the Humanities Department at Carlow College attend.

- Re-interpreting Rebellion in Irish History, The Michael Slattery Lectures, 2008.
- Irish Reputations, The Michael Slattery Lectures, 2009.

Catholic Church titles
Preceded by Robert Laffan	Archbishop of Cashel and Emly; 1833–1857	Succeeded by Patrick Leahy
