= Patrick Everard =

Roman Catholic Archbishop of Cashel and Emly

Styles of Patrick Everard
- Reference style: The Most Reverend
- Spoken style: Your Grace
- Religious style: Archbishop

Patrick Everard (died 31 March 1821) was a Roman Catholic prelate who served as the Archbishop of Cashel and Emly from 1820 to 1821.

== Biography ==
Everard was born in Fethard, County Tipperary, attending a classical school locally. He was educated at the University of Salamanca in Spain where he moved to in 1776, he was ordained in 1783 and obtained a doctorate of Divinity from the University of Bordeaux in France. Following his studies, he was the President of the Irish College in Bordeaux and Vicar General to the Archbishop of Bordeaux until the French Revolution drove him out of the country. He spent some time in England as principal of a lay academy at Ulverstone, Lancashire, which he had purchased from the Jesuits, before becoming the president of Maynooth College in Ireland.

Everard was elected the coadjutor of the Archdiocese of Cashel and Emly by the Propagation of the Faith on 19 September, and was approved by Pope Pius VII on 29 September 1814. He was also appointed the titular archbishop of Mitylene on 4 October 1814, and received episcopal consecration from Bishop William Coppinger of Cloyne and Ross on 23 April 1815. On the death of Archbishop Thomas Bray on 15 December 1820, Everard automatically succeeded as the metropolitan archbishop of Cashel and Emly.

After holding the office for only a short while, he died on 31 March 1821.

Everard, in his will left £10,000 for the purpose of founding a college to provide a liberal education of catholic youth destined for the priesthood and professional/business careers. And some years after his death St. Patrick's College, Thurles was founded. The chapel of the college, now a campus of Mary Immaculate College, is known as the Everard Memorial Chapel.

== Bibliography ==
- Brady, W. Maziere (1876). The Episcopal Succession in England, Scotland and Ireland, A.D. 1400 to 1875. Vol. 2. Rome: Tipografia Della Pace.

Catholic Church titles
Preceded by Thomas Bray	Archbishop of Cashel and Emly; 1820–1821	Succeeded by Robert Laffan
