= William Badby =

William Badby (died 1380) was a Carmelite and theological writer. He was a native of East Anglia.

== Biography ==
William was educated at one of the Carmelite monasteries (probably Norwich) of East Anglia. Later in life he attended the Carmelite schools at Oxford. These were situated in the northern suburbs of that town, and as they were open not only to the brotherhood but to all comers, his career as a doctor of theology here was so pleasing to the people that they are said to have flocked, as to a show, to hear his discourses. His popularity in this position seems to have recommended him to John of Gaunt, always a great supporter of the Carmelite order, and we are told that Badby was accustomed to hold forth in the presence of this prince and the nobility of England. According to Bale (Harl. MSS. i. 31) he was, next to Ralph Kelly, archbishop of Cashel, one of the glories of his age. Bale hints yet further that it was in some degree due to his influence, as one out of a long list of Carmelite friars whose names are given as confessors to John of Gaunt, that this prince interested himself in attempting to counteract the slanders that were about that time beginning to be levelled against this order, then in the height of its reputation, and possessing over a thousand brothers in England alone. With Badby the appointment of confessor to John of Gaunt was but the stepping-stone to the bishopric of Worcester, which, however, he held for so short a time that his name does not appear, according to Tanner, in any list of the occupants of that see. He died on 14 April 1380. Badby's writings consisted of a 'Liber Sacrarum Contionum,' 'Liber Determinationum Scripturæ;' Tanner adds certain 'Conciones Celebres,' which, however, are probably the same as the 'Liber Sacrarum Contionum.' Bale adds another work, entitled 'De Penitentia.
