= David Kearney (bishop) =

Irish prelate

Styles of David Kearney
- Reference style: The Most Reverend
- Spoken style: Your Grace
- Religious style: Archbishop

David Kearney (died 1624) was an Irish prelate of the Roman Catholic Church. He served as the Archbishop of Cashel from 1603 to 1624.

He was appointed the archbishop of the Metropolitan see of Cashel on 21 May 1603 and received episcopal consecration on 31 August 1603.

He died in Rome on 14 August 1624.

== Bibliography ==
- Brady, W. Maziere (1876). The Episcopal Succession in England, Scotland and Ireland, A.D. 1400 to 1875. Vol. 2. Rome: Tipografia Della Pace.
- Fryde, E. B.; Greenway, D. E.; Porter, S.; Roy, I., eds. (1986). Handbook of British Chronology (3rd, reprinted 2003 ed.). Cambridge: Cambridge University Press. ISBN 0-521-56350-X.

Catholic Church titles
Preceded by Dermot O'Hurley	Archbishop of Cashel; 1603–1624	Succeeded by Thomas Walsh
