= Dermot Clifford =

Irish Catholic Archbishop

Most Reverend Dermot Clifford
- Archbishop Emeritus of Cashel and Emly
- Archdiocese: Cashel and Emly
- Installed: 12 September 1988
- Term ended: 22 November 2014
- Predecessor: Thomas Morris
- Successor: Kieran O'Reilly
- Other post: Apostolic Administrator of Cloyne (7 March 2009 – 27 January 2013)
- Previous post: Coadjutor Archbishop of Cashel and Emly (1985–1988)

Orders
- Ordination: 22 February 1964
- Consecration: 9 March 1986

Personal details
- Born: 25 January 1939 (age 87) Ballymacelligott, County Kerry, Ireland
- Denomination: Roman Catholic

Dermot Clifford (born 25 January 1939) is a Catholic prelate who served as the Archbishop of Cashel and Emly in Ireland from 1988 to 2014. From 7 March 2009 to 27 January 2013, he also served as the Apostolic Administrator of the Diocese of Cloyne. He was a founding board member of Bothar.

== Early life and education ==
Clifford was born in Ballymacelligott, County Kerry, Ireland, on 25 January 1939. He was educated at Clogher National School and St Brendan's College, Killarney. Among his teachers at St. Brendan's was the late Bishop of Kerry, Diarmaid Ó Súilleabháin.

From Killarney, he moved to St Patrick's College, Maynooth, where he graduated with a BSc Degree in 1960. After Maynooth, he was sent to the Pontifical Irish College where he studied for four years and was ordained priest on 22 February 1964. Whilst in Rome, he studied at the Lateran University and obtained a Licentiate in Sacred Theology, being in Rome for the first two sessions of Vatican Council II. As a student, he claims to have been given responsibility of looking after the Irish bishops who stayed in the Irish College.

== Priesthood ==
Clifford's first post after ordination was as a teacher and Dean of Discipline in St Brendan's College, Killarney, where he taught from 1964 to 1972. He commuted to Cork five days per week (1965–1966) for his Higher Diploma in Education. He was later to lecture on a part-time basis in University College Cork in Social Science (1975–1981).

Clifford then studied Social Administration at the London School of Economics (1972–1974), where he was conferred with a master's degree with distinction. From London, he returned to his native Kerry in August 1974 to become Diocesan Secretary to Bishop Eamon Casey. During that time he also served as Chaplain to St. Mary of the Angels, Beaufort, a home for children with learning disabilities.

== Archbishop of Cashel and Emly ==
Styles of Dermot Clifford
- Reference style: The Most Reverend
- Spoken style: Your Grace
- Religious style: Archbishop

The Holy See chose him as Coadjutor Archbishop of Cashel and Emly on 17 December 1985 and he was consecrated on 9 March 1986. The Principal Consecrator was Archbishop Thomas Morris; his Principal Co-Consecrators were Archbishop Gaetano Alibrandi and Bishop Diarmaid O'Súilleabháin, the Bishop of Kerry. He was parish priest of Tipperary town for two and a half years. On 12 September 1988 he was installed as Archbishop of Cashel and Emly in a ceremony in Thurles Cathedral, presided over by the late Cardinal Tomás Ó Fiaich.

In 1989 he became the first Kerryman to hold the office of Patron of the Gaelic Athletic Association, which brought immense satisfaction to the former footballers. That same year he was awarded a PhD degree for a thesis on Carers of the Elderly and Handicapped at Loughborough University; this was based on studies he conducted in Kerry.

Clifford served on the Emigrant Commission of the Bishops' Conference and, in 1987 helped to set up the Chaplaincy Scheme to the young emigrants in the USA..

On 24 March 2010 it was announced by the Holy See that John Magee had formally resigned from his duties as Bishop of Cloyne and was now bishop emeritus and that Clifford, already apostolic administrator there, will remain as such until the appointment of a full-time successor to the Cloyne diocese.

In July 2011 Clifford wrote to the lay faithful of Cloyne and apologised for the poor way in which complaints had been handled by diocesan officials in the Diocese of Cloyne

Clifford served as Apostolic Administrator to the Diocese of Cloyne until the new bishop, William Crean was ordained and installed on 27 January 2013.

=== Apostolic visitation ===
In October 2010, Archbishop Michael Neary of Tuam, along with Cardinal Seán Brady, Archbishops Diarmuid Martin of Dublin and Dermot Clifford of Cashel and Emly met for high-level talks with heads of Vatican congregations over the apostolic visitation of Irish dioceses in the wake of the Murphy and Ryan reports. While in Rome, the Irish churchmen met with a team of investigators appointed by Pope Benedict to examine the four Irish archdioceses and "some other as yet unspecified dioceses".

In November 2014 he retired on the grounds of age.

The "Apostolic Visitors" included Cardinal Cormac Murphy-O'Connor, Archbishop emeritus of Westminster, inspected Brady's archdiocese of Armagh, and Cardinal Seán O'Malley, Archbishop of Boston, inspected archdiocese of Dublin. Toronto's Archbishop Thomas Christopher Collins investigated Cashel, while Ottawa's Archbishop Terrence Prendergast investigated the western Ireland archdiocese of Tuam. An investigation of the state of Irish seminaries was conducted by Archbishop Timothy Dolan of New York. This investigation was hampered by the exclusion of past seminarians who had not been ordained.
