= Tomás MacCearbhaill =

Irish Roman Catholic priest

Thomas O'Carroll was a 14th-century Roman Catholic priest in Ireland.

MacCearbhaill was Archdeacon of Cashel until 1365 when he became Archbishop of Tuam. In 1365 Pope Urban V translated him to Cashel. He died on 8 February 1373.
