= Thomas Croke =

Irish Catholic archbishop (1824–1902)

The Most Reverend Thomas Croke D.D.
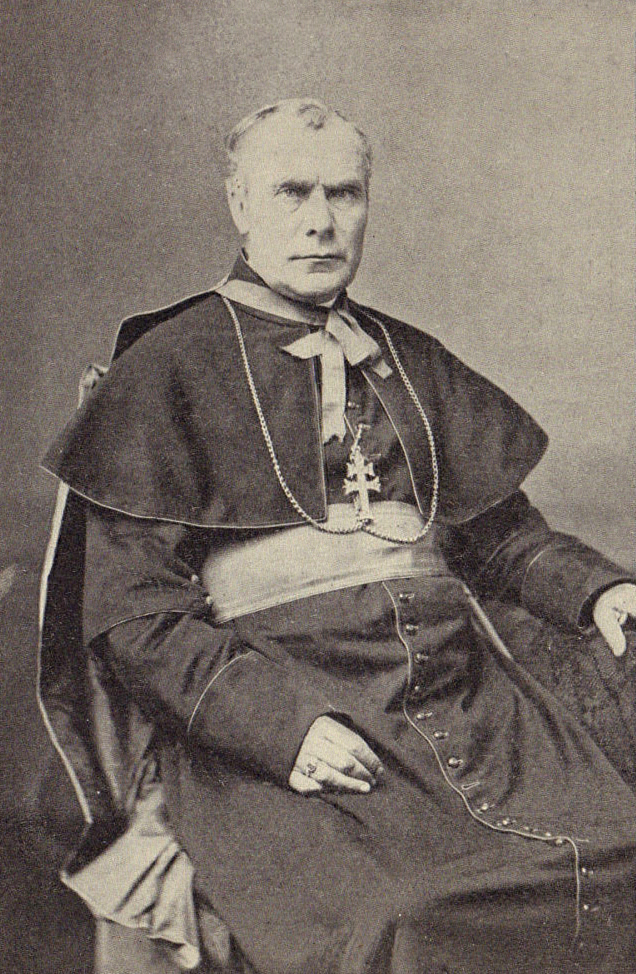
- Church: Catholic
- Archdiocese: Cashel and Emly
- Installed: 5 July 1875
- Term ended: 22 July 1902
- Predecessor: Patrick Leahy
- Successor: Thomas Fennelly
- Other post: Bishop of Auckland (1870–74)

Orders
- Ordination: May 1847

Personal details
- Born: 28 May 1824 Kilbrin, County Cork, Ireland
- Died: 22 July 1902 (aged 78) Thurles, County Tipperary, Ireland
- Buried: Cathedral of the Assumption, Thurles
- Residence: Archbishop's Palace, Thurles
- Parents: William Croke and Isabella Plummer
- Education: Doctor of Divinity
- Alma mater: Irish College in Paris; Pontifical Irish College

Thomas William Croke D.D. (28 May 1824 – 22 July 1902) was the second Catholic Bishop of Auckland, New Zealand (1870–74) and later Archbishop of Cashel and Emly in Ireland. He was important in the Irish nationalist movement, especially as a Champion of the Irish National Land League in the 1880s. The main Gaelic Athletic Association stadium in Dublin is named Croke Park, in his honour.

== Early life ==
Thomas Croke was born in Castlecor (parish of Kilbrin), County Cork, in 1824. He was the third of eight children of William Croke, an estate agent, and his wife, Isabella Plummer, daughter of an aristocratic Protestant family who disowned her following her Catholic marriage in 1817.

After William Croke died in 1834 his brother, the Reverend Thomas Croke, supervised the education and upbringing of the children. Two of Thomas's brothers entered the priesthood, while two sisters became nuns. He was educated in Charleville, County Cork and at the Irish College in Paris and the Irish College in Rome, winning academic distinctions including a doctorate of divinity with honours.

He was ordained in May 1847. Returning to Ireland for a short time he was appointed a Professor in Carlow College. Croke's brother, James, was also a priest and served in the Pacific Northwest helping to found several churches including St. Joseph's Catholic Church in Oregon Territory. The Irish radical William O'Brien said that Thomas Croke fought on the barricades in Paris during the 1848 French Revolution. Croke returned to Ireland and spent the next 23 years working there.

In 1857 Croke became wealthy due to inheriting the fortunes of his uncle James Croke who had gained his riches in the Colony of Victoria in Australia.

In 1858 he became the first president of St Colman's College, Fermoy, County Cork and then served as both parish priest of Doneraile and Vicar General of Cloyne diocese from 1866 to 1870. Thomas Croke attended the First Vatican Council as the theologian to the Bishop of Cloyne in 1870.

== Bishop of Auckland ==
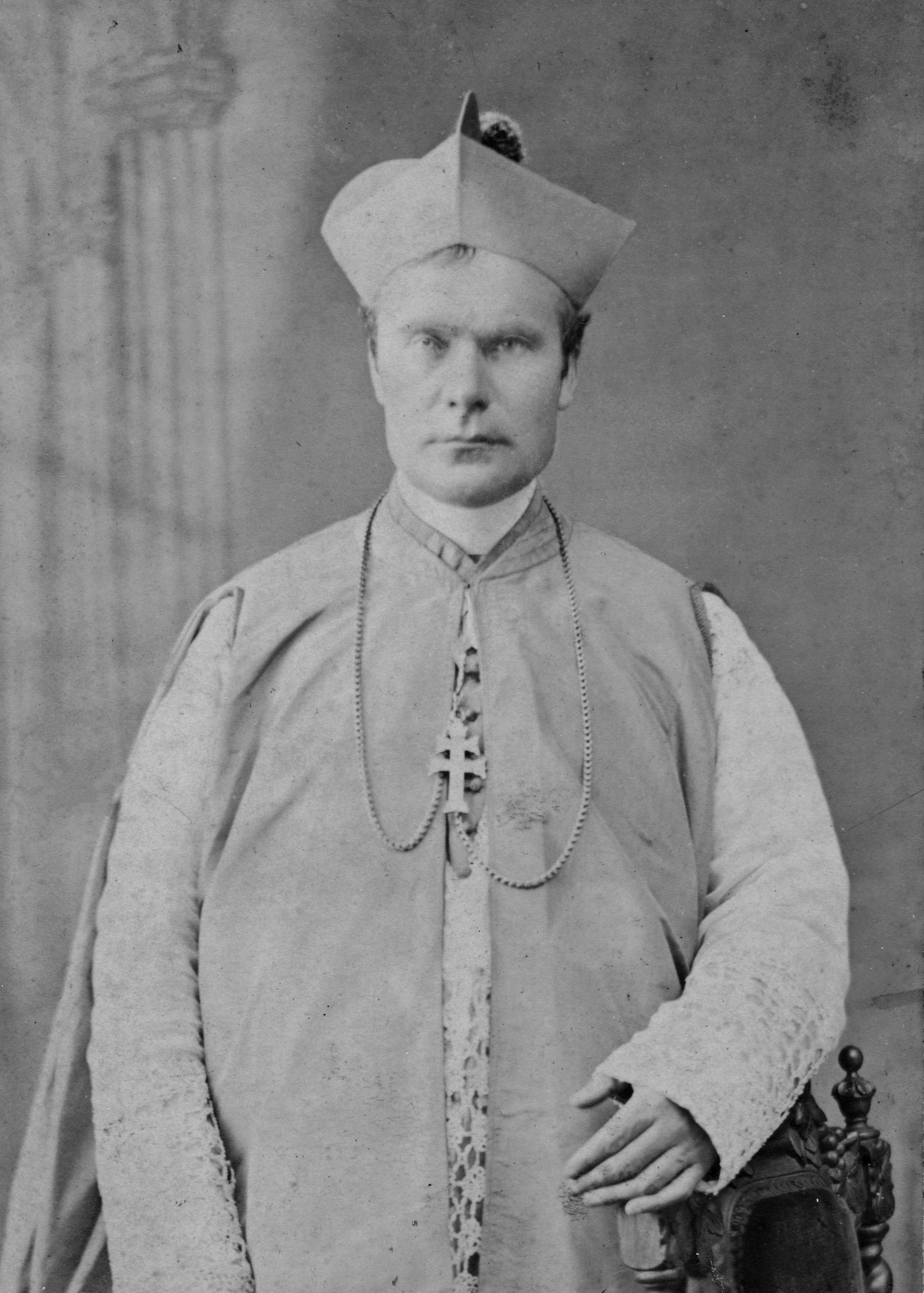
Croke in the 1870s

In 1870, Croke was appointed Bishop of Auckland in New Zealand, helped by the strong recommendation of his former professor, Paul Cullen, by then-Cardinal Archbishop of Dublin, who was largely responsible for filling the Australasian Catholic church with fellow Irishmen. Croke arrived in Auckland on 17 December 1870 in the City of Melbourne. During his three years as bishop, he restored firm leadership to a diocese left in disarray by his predecessor, Bishop J. B. F. Pompallier. Croke devoted some of his considerable personal wealth to rebuilding diocesan finances and also took advantage of Auckland's economic growth following the development of the Thames goldfields to further his aims, ensuring that all surplus income from parishes at Thames and Coromandel was passed on to him, and he instituted a more rigorous system for the Sunday collection at St Patrick's Cathedral. He appointed Walter McDonald administrator of the Cathedral.

Croke imported Irish clergy to serve the growing Catholic community, and with Patrick Moran, the first Catholic Bishop of Dunedin, he tried (unsuccessfully) to secure an Irish monopoly on future episcopal appointments in New Zealand.

Croke made several journeys to Australia from New Zealand, visiting Sydney, Melbourne and Bathurst (where his sister Mother Mary Ignatius Croke had set up the Sisters of Mercy in 1866) in 1872 and Melbourne in 1875 on his way back to Ireland.

His energies were devoted to saving the souls of the Irish immigrants rather than converting the Māori. Croke supported separate Catholic schools and their right to state aid and voiced his opposition to secular education as Auckland's Catholic schools were threatened by the provincial council's Education Act 1872, which helped to create a free, secular and compulsory education system. However, generally, Croke's image was uncontroversial. There was also little sign of the strongly Irish nationalist line he would adopt during his subsequent career in Ireland. On 28 January 1874, after barely three years in office, Croke departed for Europe, on what was ostensibly a 12-month holiday and he did not return to New Zealand.

== Archbishop of Cashel ==
Croke became a member of the Irish hierarchy when he was translated to be Archbishop of Cashel, one of the four Catholic Irish archbishoprics (Cashel & Emly, Dublin, Armagh and Tuam) in 1875.

Archbishop Croke was a strong supporter of Irish nationalism, aligning himself with the Irish National Land League during the Land War, and with the chairman of the Irish Parliamentary Party, Charles Stewart Parnell. In an 1887 interview he explained that he had opposed the League's "No rent manifesto" in 1881, preferring to stop payment of all taxes: "I opposed the No Rent Manifesto six years ago because, apart from other reasons, I thought it was inopportune and not likely to be generally acted on. Had a manifesto against paying taxes been issued at the time I should certainly have supported it on principle. I am precisely the same frame of mind just now." In 1886 he contributed five pounds for a monument to be dedicated to the Manchester Martyrs in Limerick Cathedral and in January 1878 he contributed money to a fund for released Fenian prisoners.

He also associated himself with the Temperance Movement of Theobald Mathew and the Gaelic League from its foundation in 1893. Within Catholicism, he was a supporter of Gallicanism, as opposed to the Ultramontanism favoured by the Archbishop of Dublin, Cardinal Cullen.

His support of nationalism caused successive British governments and Lord Lieutenant of Ireland's governments in Dublin to be deeply suspicious of him, as were some less politically aligned Irish bishops.

Following the scandal that erupted over Parnell's relationship with Katharine O'Shea, the separated wife of fellow MP Captain Willie O'Shea, Archbishop Croke withdrew from active participation in nationalist politics. He died at the Archbishop's Palace in Thurles on 22 July 1902, aged 78. In honour of Croke, his successors as Archbishop of Cashel and Emly traditionally were asked to throw in the ball at the minor Gaelic football and All-Ireland hurling finals. This practice ceased after 1964.

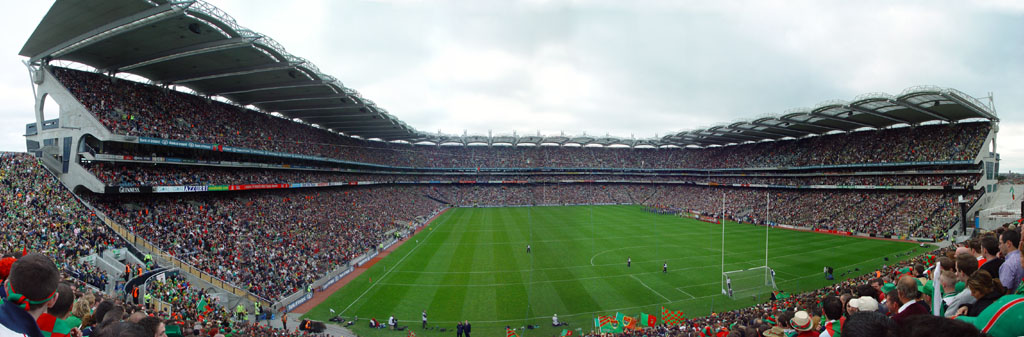
Croke Park, the headquarters of the GAA, named after Archbishop Croke

Catholic Church titles
Preceded by Jean Baptiste Pompallier	2nd Bishop of Auckland; 1870–1874	Succeeded by Walter Steins SJ
Preceded by Patrick Leahy	Archbishop of Cashel; 1875–1902	Succeeded by Thomas Fennelly
