= St. Kevin's Church, Camden Row, Dublin =

Ruined church in Ireland

Coordinates: 53°20′11″N 6°16′1″W

St. Kevin's Church
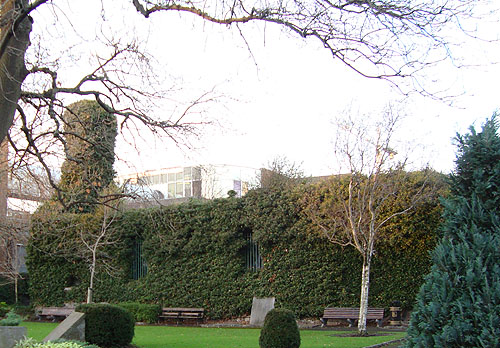
- St. Kevin's Church and Churchyard

- Location: Camden Row, Dublin
- Country: Ireland
- Denomination: Church of Ireland
- Previous denomination: Roman Catholic

History
- Former name: Eaglais Naomh Caoimhín
- Status: Parish church, since 1680 chapel-of-ease to St. Peter's
- Founded: Pre-13th century
- Dedication: Kevin of Glendalough

Architecture
- Functional status: Closed, part of public park
- Heritage designation: Preservation order
- Closed: 1912

Administration
- Parish: Parish of St. Peter (United Parish of St. Peter and St. Kevin)

There was a St. Kevin's Church (Irish: Eaglais Naomh Caoimhín) in what is now St. Kevin's Park, Camden Row, Dublin, Ireland at least as far as the 13th century. After the Reformation, it became an Anglican church. The original church was replaced around 1750 by a new one, closed in 1912 and now in ruins. Both churches were dedicated to Kevin of Glendalough. There is also a Catholic St. Kevin's Church a short distance away on Harrington Street.

== Church ==
The church was first mentioned in historical annals in 1226. It was situated some distance from the walls of Dublin, in the Irish-speaking part of the city, but close to a monastic settlement in the region of present-day Aungier Street. From the 13th century, it formed part of the Manor of St. Sepulchre, which was directly under the jurisdiction of the Archbishop of Dublin. An archaeological excavation carried out in 1967 uncovered some medieval graves and coins. The present ruined church, built on the foundations of the medieval one, dates to around 1750.

The church is the burial place of Archbishop Dermot O'Hurley (Irish: Diarmaid Ó hUrthuile), who was removed from a mass grave and interred here after his summary execution on 20 June 1584 at Hoggen Green. O'Hurley, ordained Archbishop of Cashel in 1581, was arrested after his return to Ireland and tortured in Dublin Castle. Along with 17 other Irish Catholic Martyrs, Archbishop O'Hurley was Beatified by Pope John Paul II in 1992.

In the early years of the Irish Confederate Wars (1641–1649), incursions were made into the church lands surrounding St. Kevin's by Confederate soldiers stationed in Wicklow. Trenches were dug near the church to help defend the city, but the Irish clans were able to raid cattle, horses, and the occasional merchant who was in the wrong place at the wrong time, all of which they carried away into the "wilds of Wicklow". Despite cease-fires being arranged, this situation continued until the Battle of Rathmines sealed the fate of the Confederate and Cavalier forces.

In 1698, the time of the Penal Laws, the church was offered to the Huguenot community as a place of worship and cemetery. The graveyard, however, continued to be used by Catholics until the end of the 19th century.

== Parish ==
After the Reformation, a parish of St. Kevin was administered by the Church of Ireland; it stretched as far south as present-day Rathmines and Harold's Cross. The parish was taken over by that of St. Peter's when that parish was set up in 1680. This was due to the shortage of clergymen in Dublin at the time. St. Kevin's church became a chapel of ease to St. Peter's in Aungier St., and a parish school was set up nearby on Camden Row.

The civil parish of St. Peter (which corresponded to the United Parish of St. Peter and St. Kevin) had a population of 73,000 in 1901, and 43,000 in 1971.

The last rector was Thomas Chatterton Hammond (1877–1961), who took over the post in 1910. His name can be seen on Wedding certificates dated October and December 1909.

== Cemetery ==
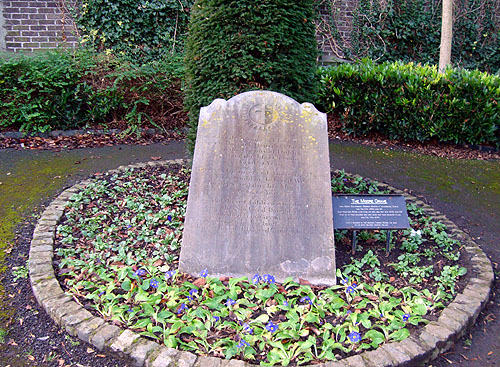
Moore family plot in St. Kevin's Park

During the 17th and 18th centuries, many notable people resident in the suburbs south of the city were interred here. After the Reformation, although a Protestant cemetery, it had come by custom to be used by Catholics and the Quakers. People buried here include:

- Rev John Austin S.J. (1717–1784), a pioneer of Catholic education in Ireland, whose tomb was restored by Rev. Dr. John T. Laphen, of St. Catherines, Meath St.
- Jean Jasper Joly (1740–1823), captain of the Irish Volunteers in 1798.
- John Keogh (1740–1817), intimate friend of Theobald Wolfe Tone, who once owned the land where Mount Jerome Cemetery now stands.
- Hugh Leeson, brewer, whose gravestone lies against the south wall of the church and whose family gave its name to Leeson Street and became Earls of Milltown and owners of Russborough House, county Wicklow.
- The Moore Family (of Thomas Moore).

In 1825 John D'Arcy, owner of Anchor Breweries, the second largest porter company in Dublin at the time, was to be buried in St. Kevin's cemetery, having died suddenly after falling from his horse. When his funeral procession from Francis St. reached St. Kevin's cemetery the sexton, under the authority of the Protestant Archbishop of Dublin, Dr. Magee, met it at the gate and forbade Catholic prayers from being recited at the grave side; they had to be said on the roadway. The mourners retreated peacefully, but a huge outcry erupted as soon as the facts became known, which reached the ears of the Lord Lieutenant, The Marquess Wellesley (brother of the Duke of Wellington, and himself married to a Catholic). He expressed disapproval of Dr. Magee's order, and despite much opposition (cemeteries were a valuable source of income to their owners) tried to alleviate Catholic grievances. Daniel O'Connell used the scandal provoked by this to such effect that he was able to get through the legislation in establishing Golden Bridge (1829) and Prospect (1831) cemeteries, which led to the establishment of Glasnevin Cemetery.

At the start of the 19th century the cemetery, like many others in Dublin, became a target of the body-snatchers, although it was surrounded by high walls (changed to railings in the 1960s). In February 1830 a Frenchman named Nagles and his friend were attacked by a group of "sack-em-ups" lying in wait near the cemetery. The criminals' attention was diverted by the arrival of a cart-load of dead bodies, giving Nagles the opportunity to escape and notify the police at Arran Quay, who apprehended the culprits. On one occasion a body-snatcher was chased as far as Thomas Street, where he finally dropped his booty—the body of a young girl.

In June 1961 the body of a local five-year-old boy Tommy Powell from Cuffe Street was found in the graveyard. Blood-stained stones found nearby indicated that he had been murdered, but despite an intensive investigation, the murderer was never discovered.

== Notable parishioners ==
The Reverend Stephen Jerome, who in 1639 was vicar of the parish, was a noted preacher and writer. After 1649 he was appointed a special preacher at St Patrick's Cathedral but was criticized for his Puritan views.

== Pilgrimage site and local folklore ==
After the execution and secret burial of Archbishop Dermot O'Hurley, his grave became a place of veneration for local Roman Catholics. In 1609, in view of the throngs of pilgrims coming to his grave, the church was rebuilt and a new entrance was made. According to Burke's 1879 History of the Irish Lord Chancellors, "Multitudes of pilgrims for three centuries flocked to his tomb, which the fancy, perhaps the superstition, of the people clothed with many legends." For example, in local Irish folklore, ghost stories about passersby on dark and stormy nights seeing Archbishop Dermot O'Hurley offering the Tridentine Mass in black Requiem vestments upon a makeshift altar over his grave in St. Kevin's churchyard are commonly told. It is always said that, when the Archbishop reaches the Consecration and Raising of the Host, both he and the altar disappear and only darkness remains.

== See also ==
- Portobello
- St. Peter's Church, Aungier Street, Dublin

== References and sources ==
Notes

Sources

- George Newenham Wright An Historical Guide to the City of Dublin
- Notice board in St. Kevin's Park.
- John Fleetwood, The Irish Body Snatchers, Tomar Publishing, Dublin, 1988. ISBN 1871793009
- F. Elrington Ball: A History of the County Dublin. 1903. Part II.
- History of Dublin Brewers
- William J. Fitzpatrick: History of the Dublin Catholic Cemeteries, Dublin, 1900.
- Casey, Christine (2005). Dublin: The City Within the Grand and Royal Canals and the Circular Road with the Phoenix Park. Yale University Press. ISBN 0300109237.
