= Jeremiah Kinane =

Irish prelate

- Archbishop of Cashel–Emly
- Church: Catholic Church
- Archdiocese: Archdiocese of Cashel–Emly
- In office: 11 September 1946 – 18 February 1959
- Predecessor: John Harty
- Successor: Thomas Morris
- Previous posts: Titular Archbishop of Dercos (1942-1946); Coadjutor Archbishop of Cashel–Emly (1942-1946); Bishop of Waterford and Lismore (1933-1942)

Orders
- Ordination: 24 April 1910
- Consecration: 29 June 1933 by John Harty

Personal details
- Born: 15 November 1884 Upperchurch, County Tipperary, United Kingdom of Great Britain and Ireland
- Died: 18 February 1959 (aged 74)

Styles of Jeremiah Kinane DD, DCL
- Reference style: The Most Reverend
- Spoken style: Your Grace
- Religious style: Archbishop

Jeremiah Kinane (1884–1959) was an Irish prelate of the Roman Catholic Church. He served as the Bishop of Waterford and Lismore, then Coadjutor Archbishop of Cashel & Emly until when he became the Metropolitan Archbishop of Cashel & Emly.

Kinane was born in Gortnahulla, Upperchurch, County Tipperary on 15 November 1884. He was ordained to the priesthood in Rome on 24 April 1910. From 1911 to 1933 he was Professor of Canon Law at St. Patrick's College, Maynooth. He was appointed the Bishop of Waterford and Lismore on 21 April 1933 and received episcopal ordination on 29 June 1933. He was then appointed titular archbishop of Decros and coadjutor of Cashel & Emly on 31 January 1942. On the death of Archbishop John Harty, Dr. Kinane succeeded as the Metropolitan Archbishop of Cashel & Emly on 11 September 1946.

A noted anti-Communist, he opposed various left wing and republican organisations during his time and was involved in controversy in the dismissal of teachers who were Communist in schools run by him.

He served as secretary to the bishops conference in Maynooth. He died in office on 18 February 1959, aged 74.

Catholic Church titles
Preceded by Bernard Hackett C.Ss.R.	Bishop of Waterford and Lismore; 1933–1942	Succeeded by Daniel Cohalan
Preceded by John Harty	Archbishop of Cashel and Emly; 1946–1959	Succeeded by Thomas Morris
