= Thomas Fennelly =

- Archbishop of Cashel–Emly
- Church: Catholic Church
- Archdiocese: Archdiocese of Cashel–Emly
- In office: 22 July 1902 – 7 May 1913
- Predecessor: Thomas Croke
- Successor: John Harty
- Other post: Titular Archbishop of Methymna (1913-1927)
- Previous posts: Titular Bishop of Ostracine (1901-1902); Coadjutor Archbishop of Cashel–Emly (1901-1902)

Orders
- Ordination: 7 June 1870
- Consecration: 9 June 1901 by Thomas Alphonsus O'Callaghan

Personal details
- Born: 27 January 1845 Moyne, County Tipperary, United Kingdom of Great Britain and Ireland
- Died: 24 December 1927 (aged 82)

Thomas Fennelly (27 January 1845 – 24 December 1927) was the Archbishop of the Roman Catholic Archdiocese of Cashel and Emly from 1902 until his retirement in 1913.

Fennelly was educated at Thurles College; St Vincent's, Castleknock; and St Patrick's College, Maynooth. He was ordained in 1870. He was parish priest of Moycarkey from 1889 until his appointment as Coadjutor Bishop of Cashel in 1901. He succeeded Archbishop Croke on 22 July 1902.

Catholic Church titles
Preceded by Thomas Croke	Archbishop of Cashel and Emly; 1902–1913	Succeeded by John Harty
