= Maurice MacGibbon =

Most Reverend Maurice MacGibbon
- Archbishop of Cashel
- Church: Catholic Church
- Archdiocese: Archdiocese of Cashel
- In office: 1567–1578
- Predecessor: Roland Baron Fitzgerald
- Successor: Dermot O'Hurley

Orders
- Consecration: 15 June 1567 by Egidio Valenti

Personal details
- Died: 1578 Cashel, Ireland

Maurice MacGibbon, O. Cist. (died 1578) was a Roman Catholic prelate who served as Archbishop of Cashel (1567–1578).

== Biography ==
Maurice MacGibbon was ordained a priest in the Cistercian Order. On 4 June 1567, he was appointed during the papacy of Pope Pius V as Archbishop of Cashel. On 15 June 1567, he was consecrated bishop by Egidio Valenti, Bishop of Nepi e Sutri, with Thomas Goldwell, Bishop of Saint Asaph, and Giacomo Galletti, Bishop of Alessano, serving as co-consecrators. He served as Archbishop of Cashel until his death in 1578.

Catholic Church titles
Preceded by Roland Baron Fitzgerald	Archbishop of Cashel; 1567–1578	Succeeded by Dermot O'Hurley
