= Archbishop of Cashel =

Irish archiepiscopal title

The Archbishop of Cashel (Irish: Ard-Easpag Chaiseal Mumhan) was an archiepiscopal title which took its name after the town of Cashel, County Tipperary in Ireland. Following the Reformation, there had been parallel apostolic successions to the title: one in the Catholic Church and the other in the Church of Ireland. The archbishop of each denomination also held the title of Bishop of Emly. In the Catholic Church, it was superseded by the role of Archbishop of Cashel and Emly when the two dioceses were united in 2015 and in the Church of Ireland the title was downgraded to a bishopric in 1838.

== History ==
=== Pre-Reformation ===
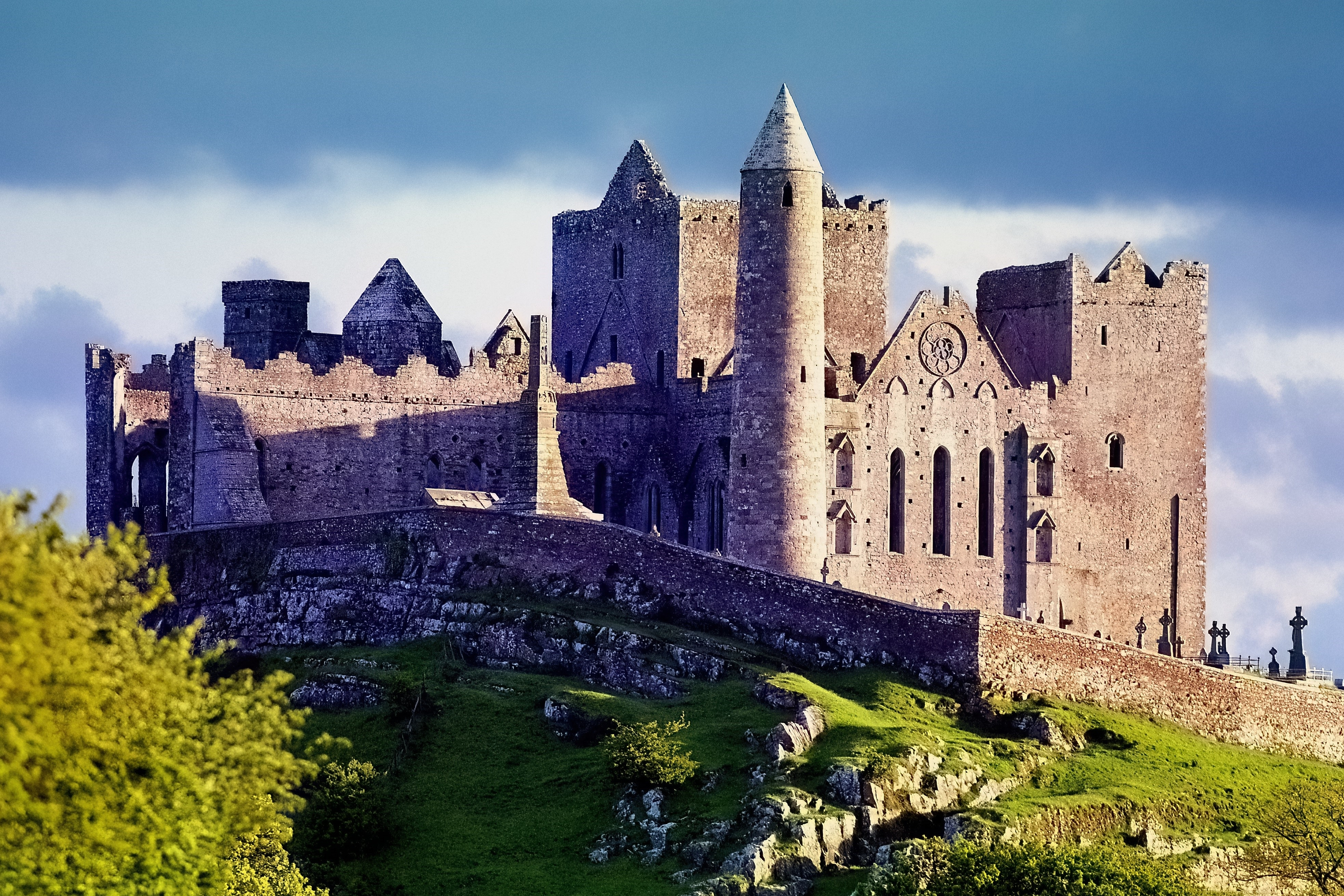
The Rock of Cashel, including the cathedral, the episcopal seat of the pre-Reformation archbishops.

In 1118, the metropolitan archbishoprics of Armagh and Cashel were established at the Synod of Ráth Breasail. The archbishop of Cashel had metropolitan jurisdiction over the southern half of Ireland, known as Leth Moga. At the Synod of Kells in 1152, the metropolitan see of Cashel lost territory on the creation of the metropolitan archbishoprics of Dublin and Tuam. The pre-Reformation archbishops' episcopal seat was located at the Rock of Cashel, the traditional royal seat of the kings of Munster.

Following the Reformation, two parallel episcopal successions ensued: one of the Church of Ireland and the other of the Catholic Church.

=== Church of Ireland ===
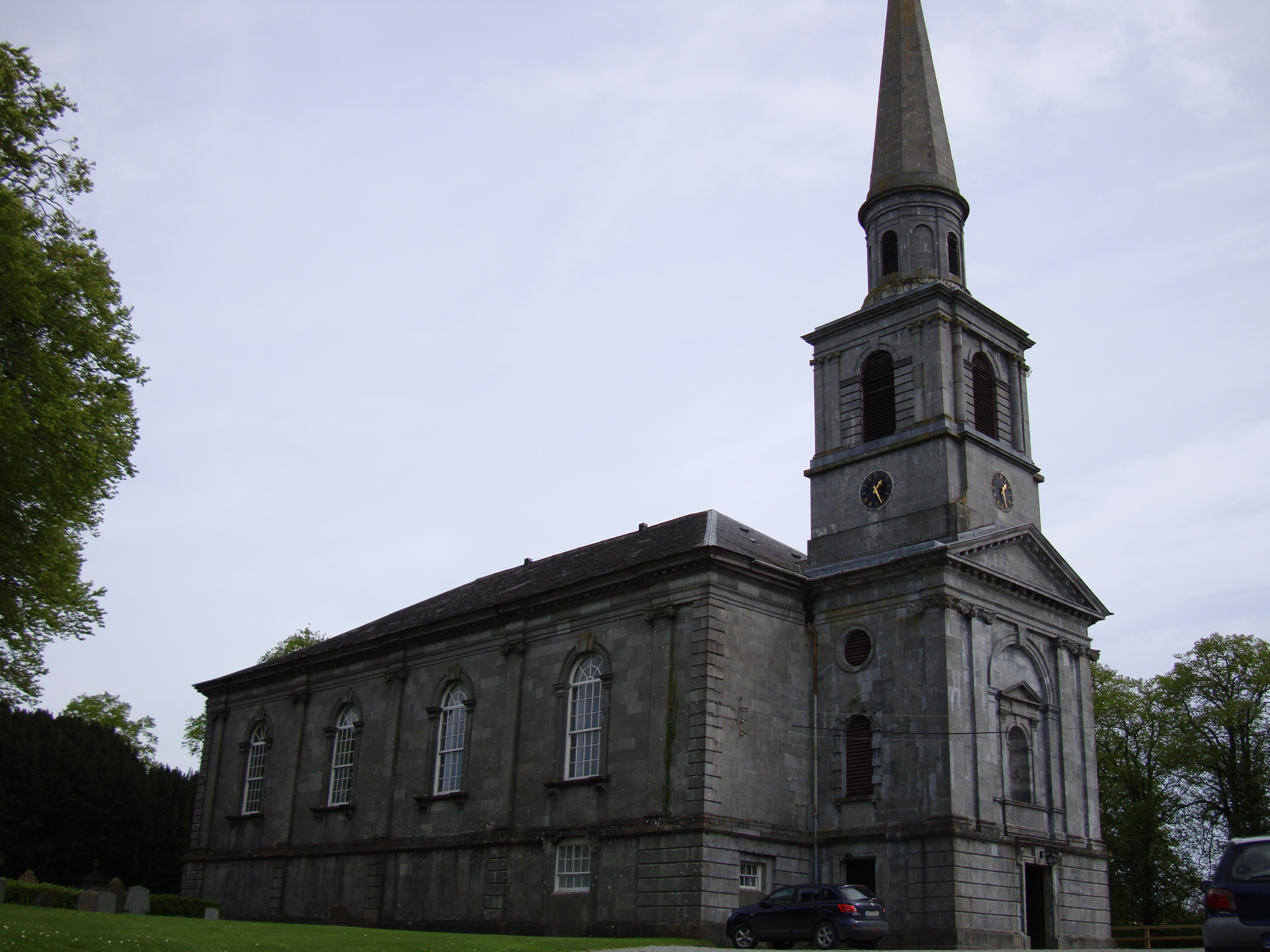
The Cathedral Church of Saint John the Baptist and Saint Patrick, Cashel, the episcopal seat of the Church of Ireland archbishops.

In the Church of Ireland, the bishopric of Emly was united to the archbishopric of Cashel by an act of the Parliament of Ireland in 1568. Under the Church Temporalities (Ireland) Act 1833 (3 & 4 Will. 4. c. 37), the bishopric of Waterford and Lismore was united to the archbishopric of Cashel and Emly on 14 August 1833. On the death of Archbishop Laurence in 1838, the archepiscopal see lost its metropolitan status and became the bishopric of Cashel and Waterford in the Church of Ireland Province of Dublin. Through reorganisation in the Church of Ireland in 1976, the bishopric of Emly was transferred to the bishopric of Limerick and Killaloe; the remainder was united with other sees to become the bishopric of Cashel and Ossory.

=== Catholic Church ===
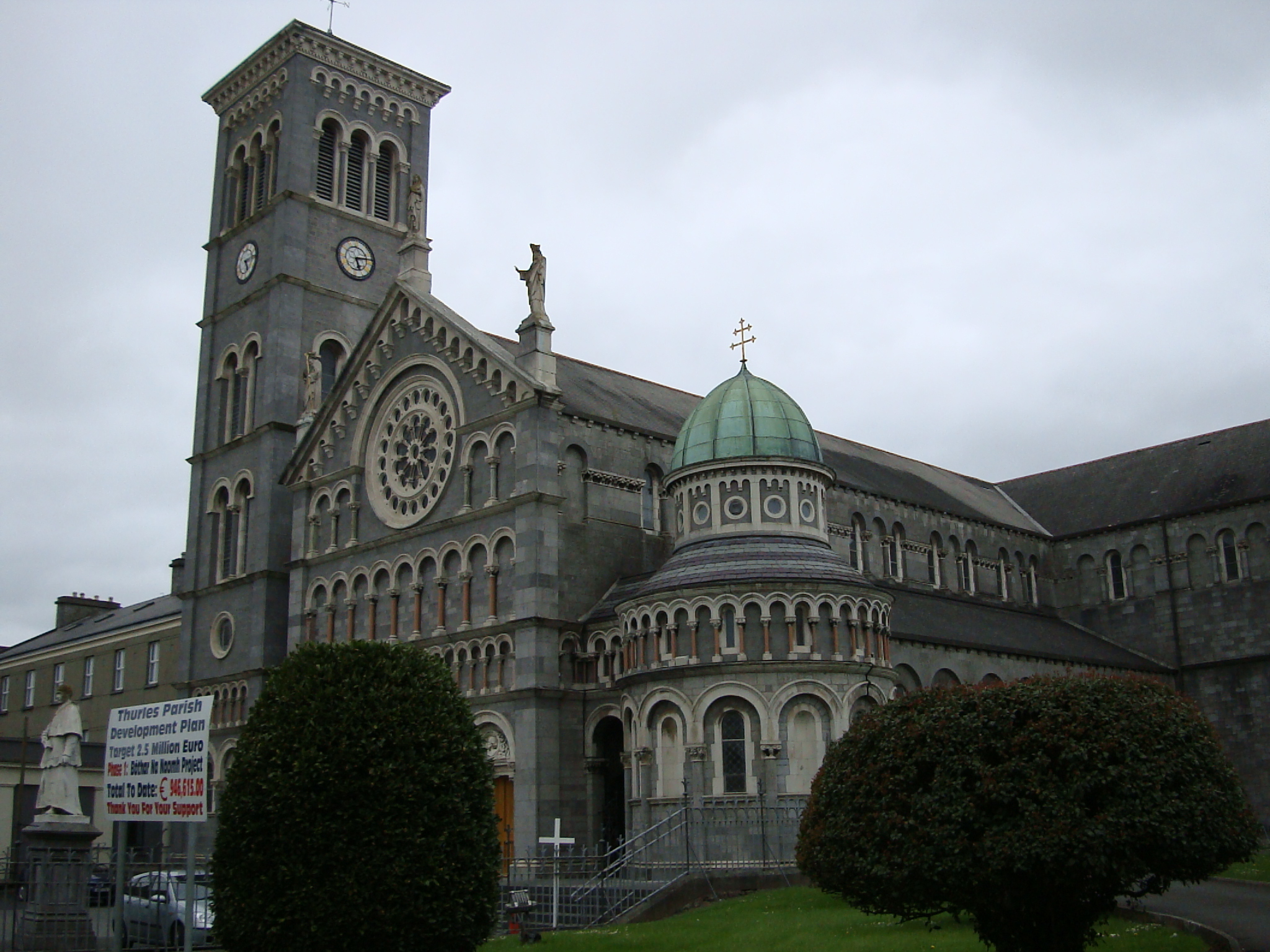
The Cathedral of the Assumption, Thurles, the episcopal seat of the Catholic archbishops.

In the Catholic Church, the archepiscopal see of Cashel had an unsettled history between the 1560s and the late 17th century. While some archbishops were appointed, there were periods when the see was vacant or administered by vicars apostolic. From the 18th century onwards, a relaxation in the Penal Laws permitted a consistent succession of archbishops. Since 10 May 1718, the archbishops of Cashel have also been bishops of Emly when the two titles were united.

On 22 November 2014, Pope Francis accepted the resignation of the Most Reverend Dermot Clifford from the pastoral government of the Metropolitan Archdiocese of Cashel and Emly, in accordance with 1983 Code of Canon Law on age grounds. On the same day, the Most Reverend Kieran O'Reilly, Bishop of Killaloe, was appointed to be the next Metropolitan Archbishop of Cashel and apostolic administrator of Emly. On 26 January 2015, the sees of Cashel and Emly were united to form the new metropolitan see of Cashel and Emly, and O'Reilly was appointed its first metropolitan archbishop.

== Pre-Reformation archbishops ==
Pre-Reformation Archbishops of Cashel
From	Until	Ordinary	Notes
1111	unknown	Máel Ísu Ua hAinmere, O.S.B.	Known in Latin as Malchus. Translated from Waterford. Appointed archbishop at the Synod of Ráth Breasail in 1111, but appears to have resigned the position shortly afterwards and returned to Waterford. Died in 1135.
unknown	1131	Máel Ísu Ua Fogluda	Known in Latin as Mauricius. Died in office.
1131	1137	Domnall Ua Conaing	Anglicised as Donat O'Conaing. Translated from Killaloe in 1131. Died in office.
1137/38	1158	Domnall Ua Lonngargáin	Anglicised as Donat O'Lonargan. Translated from Killaloe in 1137 or 1138. Received the pallium from Giovanni Paparoni at the Synod of Kells in 1152. Died in office.
bef. 1172	1182	Domnall Ua hUallacháin	Known in Latin as Donatus. Became archbishop before 1172. Died in office.
bef. 1186	1206	Muirges Ua hÉnna, O.Cist.	Known in Latin as Matthaeus, Mauricius, or Anglicised as Matthew O'Heney. Died in office at Holy Cross Abbey.
c. 1208	1216	Donnchad Ua Lonngargáin I	Known in Latin as Donatus and Dionysius. Died in office before July 1216 while at Rome or Cîteaux Abbey.
1216	1223	Donnchad Ua Lonngargáin II, O.Cist.	Known in Latin as Donatus. Consecrated before July 1216. Resigned before August 1223 and died in 1232.
1223		(Michael Scotus)	Appointed in 1223, but never consecrated. Resigned in 1223 and died in 1235.
1223	1237	Mairín Ó Briain, O.S.A.	Known in Latin as Marianus. Elected archbishop after 19 August 1224 and formally translated from Cork on 20 June 1224. Received the temporalities on 25 August 1224 and again on 20 January 1225. Resigned on 6 June 1237 and died at Inislounaght Abbey in 1238.
1238	1253	David mac Cellaig, O.P.	Also recorded as David MacKelly or O'Kelly. Translated from Cloyne before December 1238 and confirmed in 1239. Died in office on 4 April 1253.
1254	1289	David Mac Cerbaill, O. Cist.	Also recorded as David Mac Carwill or MacCarwell. Previously dean of Cashel. Elected before 17 August 1254 and appointed on that date. Received the temporalities on 19 February 1255. Died in office before 4 September 1289.
1290	1302	Stiamna Ó Brácáin	Anglicised as Stephen O'Brogan. Previously archdeacon of Glendalough (1288–1290). Elected before 31 January 1290 and appointed on 21 August 1290. Died in office on 25 July 1302.
1303	1316	Mauricius Mac Cerbaill	Anglicised as Maurice Mac Carwell or Mac Cerwill. Previously Dean of Cashel. Elected before 17 May 1303. Took the oath of fealty to King Edward I on 24 May 1303. Appointed on 17 November 1303 and received the temporalities on 28 July 1304. Died in office circa 25 March 1316.
1317	1326	William FitzJohn	Translated from Ossory on 26 March 1317. Died in office on 15 September 1326.
1327	1329	Seoán Mac Cerbaill	Anglicised as John MacCarwill. Translated from Meath on 19 January 1327. Took the oath of fealty to King Edward III on 26 September 1327. Died in office circa 27 July 1329.
1329	1331	Walter le Rede	Translated from Cork on 20 October 1329. Died in office on 17 June 1331.
1332	1345	Eóin Ó Grada	Previously treasurer of Cashel. Appointed on 27 March 1332. Died in office on 8 July 1345.
1346	1361	Radulphus Ó Ceallaigh, O.Carm.	Also surnamed Ó Caollaidhe. Translated from Leighlin on 9 January 1346. Acted as a suffragan bishop in the English Diocese of Winchester in 1346. Died in office on 20 November 1361.
1362		George Roche	Also known as George de Rupe. Appointed before 12 September 1362, but doubtful whether in full possession of the see, or even consecrated. Drowned, probably on his return from Rome, in late 1362.
1362	1365	See vacant	
1365	1372	Tomás MacCearbhaill	Anglicised as Thomas MacCarwill. Translated from Tuam before 8 March 1365. Died in office on 8 February 1372.
1373	1380	Philip of Torrington, O.F.M.	Appointed on 5 September 1373 and received the temporalities on 19 December 1373. Died in office in 1380.
1382	1387	Michael, O.F.M.	Appointed by Antipope Clement VII on 22 October 1382. Translated to the bishopric of the Isles in Scotland on 15 July 1387.
1385	c. 1405	Peter Hackett	Previously archdeacon of Cashel. Appointed by Pope Urban VI, but date is unknown. Received the temporalities on 28 October 1385. Died in office circa 1405.
1406	1440	Richard O'Hedian	Previously archdeacon of Cashel. Appointed before 6 April 1406 and consecrated before 17 June 1406. Died in office on 21 July 1440.
1440	1451/52	John Cantwell I	Previously archdeacon of Ossory. Elected before 21 November 1440 and appointed on that date. Consecrated before 28 March 1442. Died in office on 14 February 1451 or 1452.
1452	1484	John Cantwell II	Previously dean of Cashel. Appointed on 2 May and consecrated after 2 May 1452. Died in office before May 1484.
1484	1503	David Creagh	Appointed on 10 May and consecrated in Rome on 14 June 1484. Died in office on 5 September 1503.
c. 1504	1524	Maurice FitzGerald	Became archbishop circa 1504. Held provincial synods in 1511 and 1514. Died in office before October 1524.
1524	1551	Edmund Butler, O.Trin.	Prior of Athassel. Appointed archbishop on 21 October 1524, with permission to retain the priory of Athassel. Consecrated in 1527. Surrendered the priory to the crown and accepted royal supremacy. Died in office on 5 March 1551.
1551	1553	See vacant	
1553	1561	Roland Baron Fitzgerald	Also surnamed Fitzgerald. Appointed by Queen Mary I on 14 October 1553 and consecrated in December 1553, however, he does not seem to have been confirmed by Pope Julius III. In a letter of 12 October 1561, the papal legate Fr David Wolfe SJ described all the bishops in Munster as 'adherents of the Queen'. Died in office on 28 October 1561.
1561	1567	See vacant	

== Post-Reformation archbishops ==
=== Church of Ireland succession ===
Church of Ireland Archbishops of Cashel and Bishops of Emly
From	Until	Ordinary	Notes
1567	1570	James MacCawell	Nominated on 12 February and appointed by letters patent on 2 October 1567. Also became Bishop of Emly when the title united to Cashel in 1568. Died in office in 1570.
1571	1622	Miler Magrath	Translated from Clogher. Appointed on 3 February 1571. Also held in commendam the bishoprics of Waterford and Lismore (1582–1589 and 1592–1607), Killala (1613–22), and Achonry (1613–22). Died in office on 14 November 1622.
1623	1629	Malcolm Hamilton	Nominated on 8 March and consecrated on 29 June 1623. Died in office on 25 April 1629
1629	1659	Archibald Hamilton	Translated from Killala and Achonry. Nominated on 14 November 1629 and appointed by letters patent on 20 April 1630. Died in office at Stockholm, Sweden in 1659.
1660	1667	Thomas Fulwar	Translated from Ardfert and Aghadoe. Nominated on 2 August 1660 and appointed by letters patent on 1 February 1661. Died in office on 31 March 1667.
1667	1685	Thomas Price	Translated from Kildare. Nominated on 20 April and appointed by letters patent on 30 March 1667. Died in office on 4 August 1685.
1690	1694	Narcissus Marsh	Translated from Ferns and Leighlin. Nominated on 25 December 1690 and appointed by letters patent on 26 February 1691. Translated to Dublin on 24 May 1694.
1694	1727	William Palliser	Translated from Cloyne. Nominated on 10 April and appointed by letters patent on 26 June 1694. Died in office on 1 January 1727.
1727		William Nicolson	Translated from Derry. Nominated on 10 January and appointed by letters patent on 28 January 1727. Died in office on 14 February 1727.
1727	1729	Timothy Godwin	Translated from Kilmore and Ardagh. Nominated on 20 June and appointed by letters patent on 3 July 1727. Died in office on 13 December 1729.
1729	1744	Theophilus Bolton	Translated from Elphin. Nominated on 26 December 1729 and appointed by letters patent on 6 January 1730. Died in office on 31 January 1744.
1744	1752	Arthur Price	Translated from Meath. Nominated on 20 April and appointed by letters patent on 7 May 1744. Died in office on 17 July 1752.
1752	1753	John Whitcombe	Translated from Down and Connor. Nominated on 12 August and appointed by letters patent on 1 September 1752. Died in office on 22 September 1753.
1754	1779	Michael Cox	Translated from Ossory. Nominated on 3 January and appointed by letters patent on 22 January 1754. Died in office on 28 May 1779.
1779	1801	Charles Agar	Translated from Cloyne. Nominated on 26 July and appointed by letters patent on 6 August 1779. Translated to Dublin on 7 December 1801.
1801	1822	Charles Brodrick	Translated from Kilmore. Nominated on 21 November and appointed by letters patent on 9 December 1801. Died in office on 6 May 1822.
1822	1838	Richard Laurence	Nominated on 28 June and consecrated on 21 July 1822. Died in office on 28 December 1838.
1838	1976	See part of the Anglican bishopric of Cashel and Waterford	
since 1976		See part of the Anglican bishopric of Cashel and Ossory	

=== Catholic succession ===
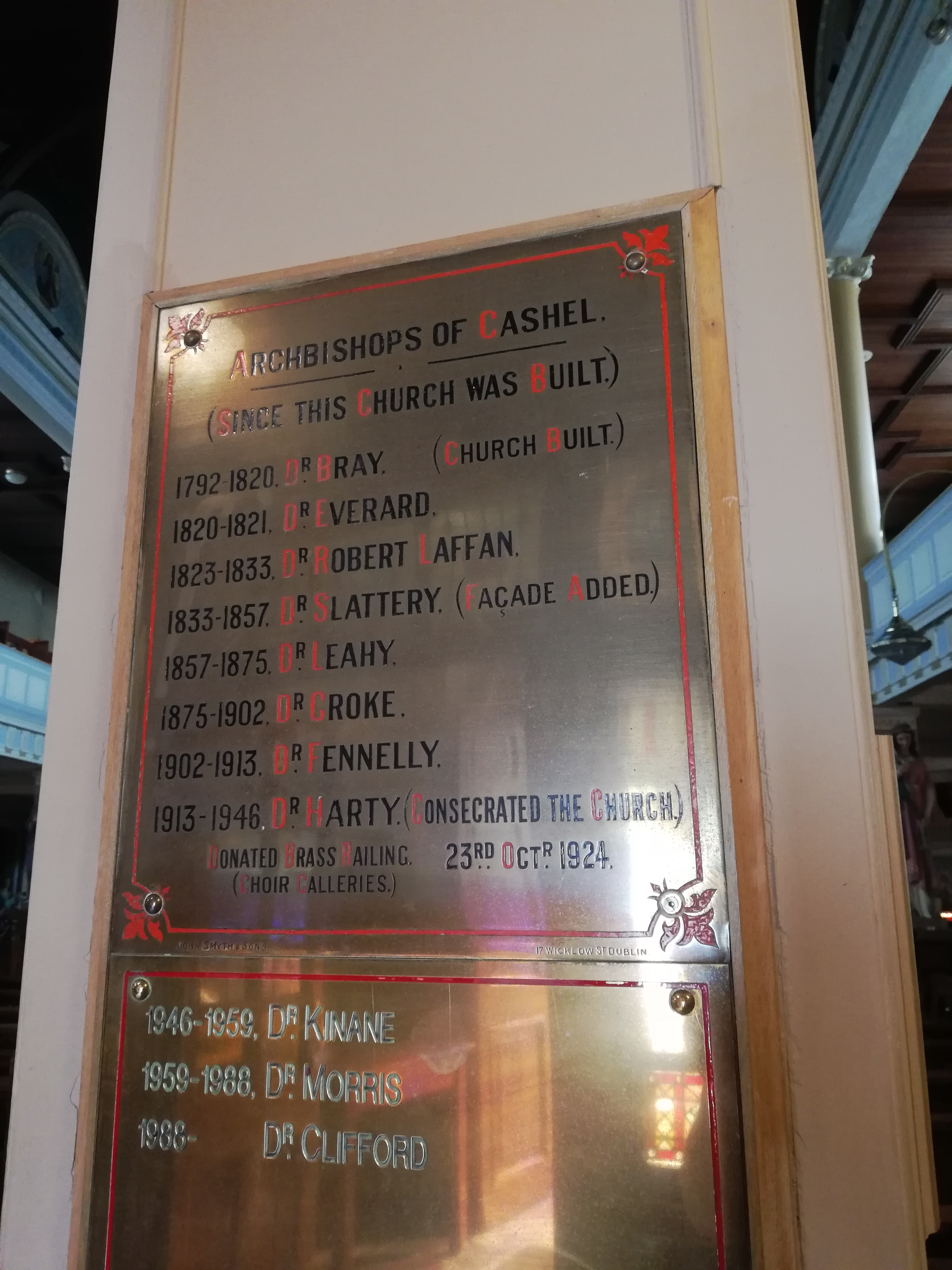
List of Catholic archbishops since 1792 (on display in the Catholic Church of John the Baptist, Cashel)

Catholic Archbishops of Cashel
From	Until	Ordinary	Notes
1567	1578	Maurice MacGibbon, O.Cist.	Appointed on 4 June 1567. Died in office.
1578	1581	See vacant	
1581	1584	Bl. Dermot O'Hurley	Known in Irish as Diarmaid Ó hUrthuile. Appointed on 11 September 1581. Died in office on 19 June 1584. (Beatified 27 Sep 1992.)
1584	1603	See vacant	
1603	1624	David Kearney	Appointed on 21 May and consecrated on 31 August 1603. Died in office on 14 August 1624.
1624	1626	See vacant	
1626	1654	Thomas Walsh	Appointed on 27 April and consecrated on 8 July 1626. Died in office on 5 May 1654.
1657	1666	(John de Burgo)	Appointed vicar apostolic of Cashel by papal brief on 17 April 1657. Translated as vicar apostolic of Killaloe in 1666.
1665	unknown	(Gerard Fitzgerald)	Appointed vicar apostolic of Cashel by papal brief on 24 November 1665.
1669	1674	William Burgat	Formerly vicar apostolic of Emly. Appointed archbishop on 11 January 1669, but continued as administrator of Emly. Consecrated in France before 12 October 1669. Died in office.
1674	1677	See vacant	
1677	1693	John Brenan	Translated from Waterford and Lismore. Appointed archbishop on 8 March 1677, but continued as administrator of Waterford and Lismore, along with Emly. Died in office.
1693	1695	See vacant	
1695	1710	Edward Comerford	Appointed archbishop on 14 November 1695, and administrator of Emly and Kilfenora. Died in office on 21 February 1710.
1711	1718	Christopher Butler	Appointed on 1 September 1711 and consecrated on 18 October 1712. Also, administrator of Emly and Ross.
Catholic Archbishops of Cashel and Bishops of Emly
From	Until	Ordinary	Notes
1718	1757	Christopher Butler	Became Bishop of Emly when the title united to Cashel on 10 May 1718. Died in office on 4 September 1757.
1757	1774	James Butler I	Appointed coadjutor archbishop on 16 January and consecrated in May 1750; succeeded on 4 September 1757. Died in office on 17 May 1774. He was the great-great-grandson of James Butler, 2nd/12th Baron Dunboyne
1774	1791	James Butler II	Appointed coadjutor archbishop on 15 March and consecrated on 4 July 1773. Succeeded as metropolitan archbishop on 17 May 1774. Died in office on 29 July 1791.
1792	1820	Thomas Bray	Appointed on 20 July and consecrated on 14 October 1792. Died in office on 15 December 1820.
1820	1821	Patrick Everard	Appointed coadjutor archbishop on 29 September 1814. Succeeded as metropolitan archbishop on 15 December 1820. Died in office on 31 March 1821.
1821	1823	See vacant	
1823	1833	Robert Laffan	Appointed and approved on 17 February, papal decree dated 1 March, and papal brief dated 18 March 1823. Died in office in 1833.
1833	1857	Michael Slattery	Elected on 26 November, approved on 5 December, papal decree dated 7 December, papal brief dated 22 December 1833, and consecrated on 24 February 1834. Died in office on 4 February 1857.
1857	1875	Patrick Leahy	Elected on 27 April, approved on 3 May, papal decree dated 5 May, and consecrated on 29 June 1857. Died in office on 26 January 1875.
1875	1902	Thomas Croke	Translated from Auckland, N.Z. Appointed on 22 June, approved on 24 June, and received the pallium on 5 July 1875. Died in office on 22 July 1902.
1901	1913	Thomas Fennelly	Appointed coadjutor archbishop on 9 June 1901. Succeeded as metropolitan archbishop on 27 July 1902. Resigned on 7 March 1913 and died on 24 December 1927.
1913	1946	John Harty	Appointed on 4 December 1913 and consecrated on 18 January 1914. Died in office on 11 September 1946.
1942	1959	Jeremiah Kinane	Translated from Waterford and Lismore. Appointed coadjutor archbishop on 4 February 1942. Succeeded as metropolitan archbishop on 11 September 1946. Died in office on 18 February 1959.
1959	1988	Thomas Morris	Appointed on 24 December 1959 and consecrated on 28 February 1960. Resigned 12 September 1988 and died on 16 January 1997.
1988	2014	Dermot Clifford	Appointed coadjutor archbishop on 17 December 1985 and consecrated on 9 March 1986. Succeeded as metropolitan archbishop on 12 September 1988. Retired in accordance with Canon Law on age grounds on 22 November 2014.
Catholic Archbishops of Cashel and Emly
From	Until	Ordinary	Notes
2014	present	Kieran O'Reilly SMA	Previously Bishop of Killaloe. Although he was appointed on 22 November 2014 to be metropolitan archbishop of Cashel, the merging of two diocese meant that he instead received the title metropolitan archbishop of Cashel and Emly upon his installation on 26 January 2015.

== Bibliography ==
- Cotton, Henry (1851). The Province of Munster. Fasti Ecclesiae Hiberniae: The Succession of the Prelates and Members of the Cathedral Bodies of Ireland. Vol. 1 (2nd ed.). Dublin: Hodges and Smith.
- Fryde, E. B.; Greenway, D. E.; Porter, S.; Roy, I., eds. (1986). Handbook of British Chronology (3rd, reprinted 2003 ed.). Cambridge: Cambridge University Press. ISBN 0-521-56350-X.
- Moody, T. W.; Martin, F. X.; Byrne, F. J., eds. (1984). Maps, Genealogies, Lists: A Companion to Irish History, Part II. New History of Ireland. Vol. XI. Oxford: Oxford University Press. ISBN 0-19-821745-5.
