= Roland Baron Fitzgerald =

Most Reverend Roland Baron Fitzgerald
- Archbishop of Cashel
- Church: Catholic Church
- Archdiocese: Archdiocese of Cashel
- In office: 1553–1561
- Predecessor: Edmund Butler
- Successor: Maurice MacGibbon

Orders
- Consecration: Dec 1553 by Hugh Curwen

Personal details
- Died: 28 October 1561 Cashel, Ireland

Roland Baron Fitzgerald (died 1561) was a Roman Catholic prelate who served as Archbishop of Cashel (1553–1561).

== Biography ==
In 1553, Roland Baron Fitzgerald was appointed during the papacy of Pope Julius III as Archbishop of Cashel. In Dec 1553, he was consecrated bishop. He served as Archbishop of Cashel until his death on 28 October 1561.

Catholic Church titles
Preceded by Edmund Butler	Archbishop of Cashel; 1553–1561	Succeeded by Maurice MacGibbon
