= Robert Laffan =

Irish Catholic bishop

Styles of Robert Laffan
- Reference style: The Most Reverend
- Spoken style: Your Grace
- Religious style: Archbishop

Robert Laffan (died 3 July 1833) was an Irish Roman Catholic prelate who served as the Archbishop of Cashel and Emly from 1823 to 1833.

He was the son of Walter Laffan, Esquire, of Cashel in County Tipperary, Ireland, and a grandson of Richard de Courcy, Esquire, also of Cashel.

He was ordained a priest around 1794 and served as parish priest for Moycarkey in County Tipperary, before being selected to head the Roman Catholic Archdiocese of Cashel and Emly by the Sacred Congregation for the Propagation of the Faith in 1823. Laffan was appointed by Pope Pius VII on 23 February 1823 and his papal brief was issued on 18 March 1823. He was consecrated on 6 July 1823 by Daniel Murray, Archbishop of Dublin.

Archbishop Laffan's successful career is largely attributed to the court influence of his brother Sir Joseph de Courcy Laffan, a baronet who served as personal physician to both the Duke of Kent (father of Queen Victoria) and the Duke of York (an elder son of King George III). He certainly enjoyed the endorsement of the Duke of Wellington.

He died in office on 3 July 1833.

Catholic Church titles
Vacant Title last held by Patrick Everard	Archbishop of Cashel and Emly; 1823–1833	Succeeded by Michael Slattery
