= Thomas Morris (bishop) =

Irish Catholic Archbishop

The Most Reverend Dr. Thomas Morris D.D. KC*HS
- Archbishop Emeritus of Cashel and Emly
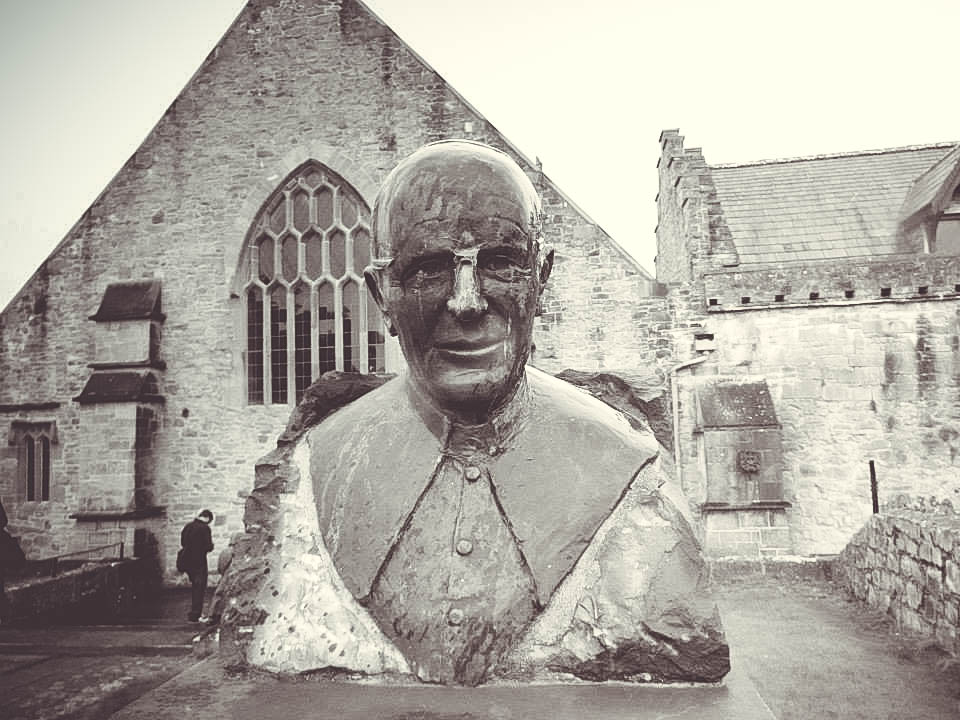
- Portrait bust at Holy Cross Abbey
- Archdiocese: Cashel and Emly
- Installed: 21 December 1959
- Term ended: 12 September 1988
- Predecessor: Jeremiah Kinane
- Successor: Dermot Clifford

Orders
- Ordination: 18 June 1939
- Consecration: 28 February 1960 by Cardinal John D'Alton

Personal details
- Born: 16 October 1914 Killenaule, County Tipperary, Ireland
- Died: 16 January 1997 (aged 82) County Tipperary
- Buried: Thurles, County Tipperary
- Denomination: Roman Catholic

Thomas Morris, D.D. KC*HS (16 October 1914 – 16 January 1997), was the Catholic Archbishop of Cashel and Emly in Ireland from 1959 to 1988.

== Biography ==
Morris was born in Kilkennybeg, in the parish of Killenaule, County Tipperary, and was educated first at Killenaule, and then by the Christian Brothers in Thurles.

He entered St Patrick's College, Maynooth in September 1932 where he took a first class Honours degree in English in 1935 before embarking on theological studies.

He was one of six Cashel and Emly students ordained to the priesthood on 18 June 1939 and proceeded to the Dunboyne Institute for postgraduate studies which culminated in a doctorate in theology in June 1941. He taught at Glenstal Abbey for a few months, moving to St. Patrick's College, Thurles, in January 1942, where he taught theology until 1960 when he became archbishop.

Aside from his seminary teaching he was appointed part-time secretary to Archbishop Kinane in 1947 and vice-president of the seminary in 1957.

It is reported he often spent his holidays in the Gaeltacht in Ballyferriter where he became deeply steeped in Irish literature and culture. In April 1954 he was chosen to preach (in Irish) at the first Mass celebrated in Cormac's Chapel on the Rock of Cashel since the Reformation.

== Archbishop of Cashel and Emly ==
Styles of Thomas Morris
- Reference style: The Most Reverend
- Spoken style: Your Grace
- Religious style: Archbishop

The Holy See chose him as Archbishop of Cashel and Emly on 21 December 1959 and he was consecrated on 28 February 1960. The Principal Consecrator was Archbishop Cardinal D'Alton; his Principal Co-Consecrators were Denis Moynihan the Bishop of Kerry.

Dr Morris attended the Second Vatican Council, where he became familiar with the Archbishop of Kracow, and future pope Karol Wojtyla. He was the only Irish member of the Pontifical Commission on Birth Control that preceded Humane Vitae where predictably he voted against any change.

During his period as archbishop he was responsible for the restoration of Holy Cross Abbey where he continued to work as a priest after retirement. He served as the first Grand Prior of the newly established Lieutenancy of Ireland of the Equestrian Order of the Holy Sepulchre of Jerusalem, a centuries-old Order of Chivalry dedicated to supporting the Christians of the Holy Land.
