= Thomas Bray (bishop) =

Irish Roman Catholic archbishop (1749–1820)

Styles of Thomas Bray
- Reference style: The Most Reverend
- Spoken style: Your Grace
- Religious style: Archbishop

Thomas Bray D.D. (5 March 1749 – 15 December 1820) was an Irish Roman Catholic prelate who served as the Archbishop of Cashel from 1792 to 1820. Dr Bray was ordained to the priesthood on 22 May 1774 at Paris.

== Life ==
Thomas Bray was born in Fethard, County Tipperary in 1749, to John and Margaret Power Bray. John Bray was a wine merchant. Margaret's brother, James, was a canon at Cassels in Flanders, who also served as chaplain to the French Ambassador at Rome. James owned property near Avignon and helped pay for the education of his sister's many children.

Thomas Bray studied at Avignon, at the Collegio Urbano, and in Paris, where he was ordained in 1774.

In 1779 he became a parish priest in Cashel; in 1782, he was appointed one of two vicars-general for the Archdiocese of Cashel. In 1792, he was appointed to succeed James Butler II as Archbishop of Cashel. Bray used a bequest from Archbishop Butler to establish the Presentation convent in Thurles. In 1800, the Archbishop condemned the practice of keening, that was still be carried on in some places.

Thomas Bray died on 15 December 1820, and was succeeded by his coadjutor Patrick Everard.

== Works ==
He was author of the following privately printed work: Statuta Synodalia pro unitis Diœcesibus Cassel. et Imelac. lecta, approbata, edita, et promulgata in Synodo Diœcesana; cui interfuit clerus utriusque Diœoeceseos, habita prima hebdomada mensis Septembris, anno M.DCCC.X., 2 vols., Dublin, 1813. This book contains a papal bull against freemasonry; a decree of the Council of Trent against duels, with an explanation of it in English to be given by each priest to his flock; and short memoirs of the archbishops of Cashel and the bishops of Emly. The second volume bears the following title: Regulations, Instructions, Exhortations, and Prayers, &c., &c., in English and Irish: with the manner of absolving heretics, in Latin and English: for the united dioceses of Cashel and Emly.
