= John Harty (bishop) =

Irish archbishop

- Archbishop of Cashel–Emly
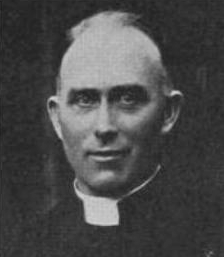
- Church: Catholic Church
- Archdiocese: Archdiocese of Cashel–Emly
- In office: 4 December 1913 – 11 September 1946
- Predecessor: Thomas Fennelly
- Successor: Jeremiah Kinane

Orders
- Ordination: 20 May 1894
- Consecration: 18 January 1914 by Thomas Fennelly

Personal details
- Born: John Mary Harty; 11 August 1867 Knocknagorteeny, Moroe, County Limerick, United Kingdom of Great Britain and Ireland
- Died: 11 September 1946 (aged 79) Thurles, North Tipperary, Republic of Ireland
- Buried: Cathedral of the Assumption
- Education: Crescent College; St. Patrick's College, Thurles; Maynooth College

John Mary Harty (11 August 1867 – 11 September 1946) served as Roman Catholic Archbishop of Cashel from 1913 until his death in 1946. He served as Patron of the Gaelic Athletic Association from 1928. The Dr. Harty Cup, the trophy for Munster Schools Hurling, is named in his honour, as is the playing field of his native Murroe GAA club.

== Biography ==
Born in Knocknagurteeny, Murroe, County Limerick, he was educated by the Jesuits in Crescent College, Limerick, and from there went to St. Patrick's College, Thurles, and then Maynooth College. He was ordained for the priesthood by Dr. Walsh in Clonliffe College.

Following ordination, Harty spent a year pursuing postgraduate studies in Maynooth as a Dunboyne student. In 1906 he co-founded (with Prof. Walter Mc Donald) the Irish Theological Quarterly, serving as editor, for a number of years, Dr. Harty also served as editor of Irish Ecclesiastical Record. He held the chair of Dogmatic Theology in Maynooth, and became Senior Professor of Moral Theology. From 1914, Harty was president of the Catholic Truth Society of Ireland. He was a contributor to the Catholic Encyclopedia. He chaired the committee for the Eucharistic Congress in Dublin in 1932.

Harty died in Thurles on 11 September 1946, and was buried at the Cathedral of the Assumption.
