= Patrick Leahy (bishop) =

- Archbishop of Cashel-Emly
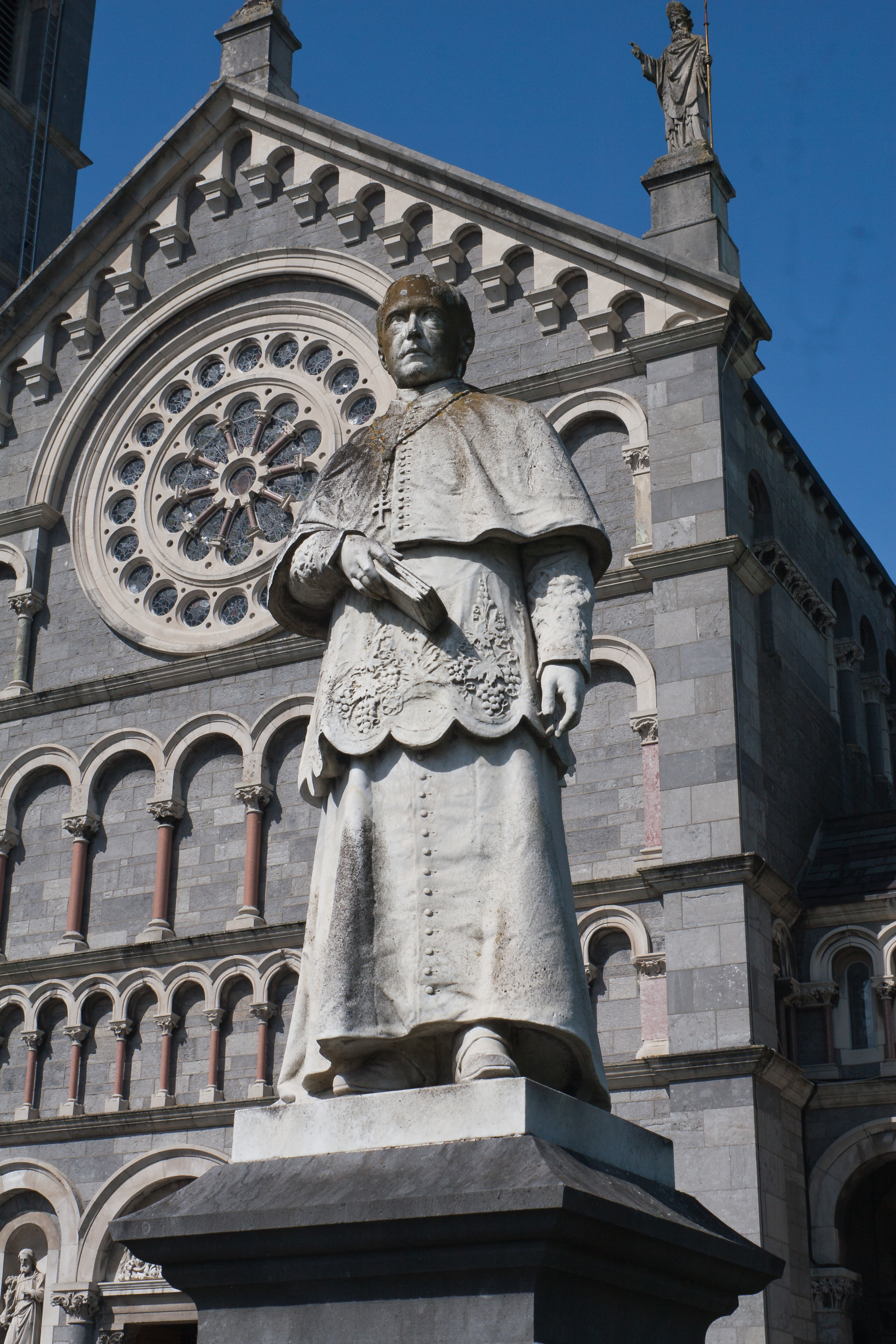
- Statue of Patrick Leahy in front of his cathedral
- Church: Catholic Church
- Archdiocese: Archdiocese of Cashel-Emly
- In office: 15 May 1857 – 26 January 1875
- Predecessor: Michael Slattery
- Successor: Thomas Croke

Orders
- Ordination: 18 June 1833
- Consecration: 29 June 1857 by Paul Cullen

Personal details
- Born: 31 May 1806 Gortnahoe, County Tipperary, United Kingdom of Great Britain and Ireland
- Died: 26 January 1875 (aged 68) Thurles, County Tipperary, United Kingdom of Great Britain and Ireland

Patrick Leahy (1806–1875) was the Archbishop of the Roman Catholic Archdiocese of Cashel and Emly.

== Life ==
Leahy, named for father Patrick Leahy, civil engineer and county surveyor of Cork, was born near Thurles, County Tipperary, on 31 May 1806, and was educated at Maynooth.

On his ordination he became Roman Catholic curate of a small parish in the diocese of Cashel. He was soon appointed professor of theology and scripture in St. Patrick's College at Thurles, and shortly afterwards president of that institution. On 22 August 1850 he was one of the secretaries of the synod or national council of Thurles, and was afterwards appointed parish priest of Thurles and vicar-general of the diocese of Cashel.

When the catholic university was opened in Dublin in 1854, he was selected for the office of vice-rector under Dr. J. H. (afterwards Cardinal) Newman, the rector, and filled a professor's chair. He was elected archbishop of Cashel 27 April 1857 and consecrated on 29 June. In 1866 and 1867 he was deputed, with the Bishop of Clonfert, to conduct the negotiations with Lord Mayo, the chief secretary for Ireland, with respect to the proposed endowment of the Roman Catholic university.

He was a strong advocate of the cause of temperance, and enforced the Sunday closing of the public-houses in his diocese. Owing to his energy the fine cathedral at Thurles was built at a cost of 45,000 pounds.

He died at the episcopal residence near Thurles 26 January 1875, and was buried in Thurles Cathedral on 3 February.

A statue to Leahy was erected in the grounds of Thurles cathedral in 1911. In June 2019 in an act of vandalism, the head of the statue was removed; it was restored in December 2023.

Catholic Church titles
Preceded by Michael Slattery	Archbishop of Cashel and Emly; 1857–1875	Succeeded by Thomas Croke
