= Cathedral of the Assumption, Thurles =

Church in Thurles, Ireland

Cathedral of the Assumption
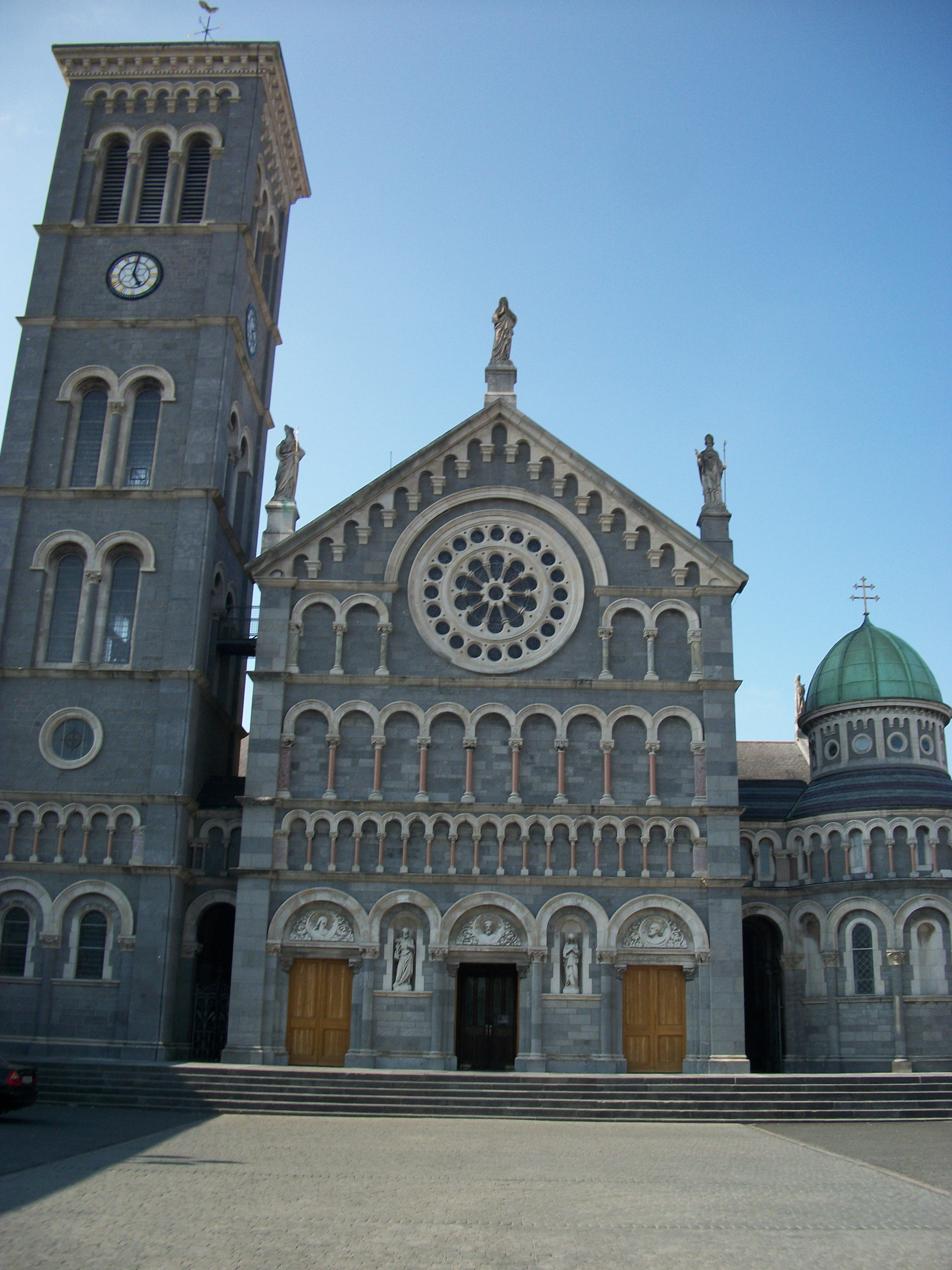
- The main façade

Religion
- Affiliation: Roman Catholic
- Diocese: Archdiocese of Cashel and Emly
- Rite: Roman
- Ecclesiastical or organizational status: Cathedral
- Year consecrated: 21 June 1879

Location
- Location: Thurles, Ireland
- Interactive map of Cathedral of the Assumption
- Coordinates: 52°40′49″N 7°48′32″W

Architecture
- Architect: J.J McCarthy
- Type: Church
- Style: Romanesque Revival
- Groundbreaking: 1865
- Completed: 1879

The Cathedral of the Assumption is the mother church of the Metropolitan Province of Cashel and the cathedral church of the Roman Catholic Archdiocese of Cashel and Emly in Thurles, County Tipperary in Ireland. It is the cathedra of the Archbishop of Cashel and Emly and stands on the site of earlier chapels, which were the only Roman Catholic churches in Thurles. Following the English Reformation, many archdiocesan assets, including the cathedral at the Rock of Cashel were appropriated by the established church. James Butler II (1774–91), on being appointed by the Holy See, moved his residence and cathedra from Cashel, favouring Thurles instead, where his successors continue to reign today.

== History ==
Following the appropriation of church assets by the Church of Ireland, the majority population who adhered to Roman Catholicism were obliged to conduct their services elsewhere. From the time of the English Reformation onwards, those archbishops appointed by Rome had to make their throne in whichever house in County Tipperary would hide them from the forces of the Crown. That state of affairs continued until the late 18th century, when some of the harsher provisions of the Penal Laws were relaxed.

In 1857, Archbishop Patrick Leahy revealed his plan to replace the 'Big Chapel', which had been used as the parish church in town, with, as Archbishop Bray explained, "a cathedral worthy of the Archdiocese of Cashel and Emly"

Work commenced in 1865, and the impressive Romanesque Revival architecture building, with its façade modelled on that of Pisa Cathedral, in Italy, was consecrated by Archbishop Thomas Croke on 21 June 1879.

In the Church of Ireland, the historic cathedral on the Rock of Cashel was closed for worship in 1721. A new Georgian cathedral was completed in 1784, St. Peter the Rock Cathedral, Cashel.

== Architecture ==
The architect was J.J McCarthy; Barry McMullen was the main builder. J.C. Ashlin was responsible for the enclosing walls, railings and much of the finished work.

The building has many architectural features, including an impressive rose window, a baptistery, and its most important possession is a tabernacle of Giacomo della Porta, a pupil of Michelangelo.

The tower holds a set of eight bells, cast by John Murphy of Dublin in 1867. Originally intended to be hung for Change ringing, they are now unringable and chimed by hammers. It is thought that the tower is too weak, and the bells are hung too high in the tower, to deal with the forces associated with full-circle ringing.

== Gallery ==
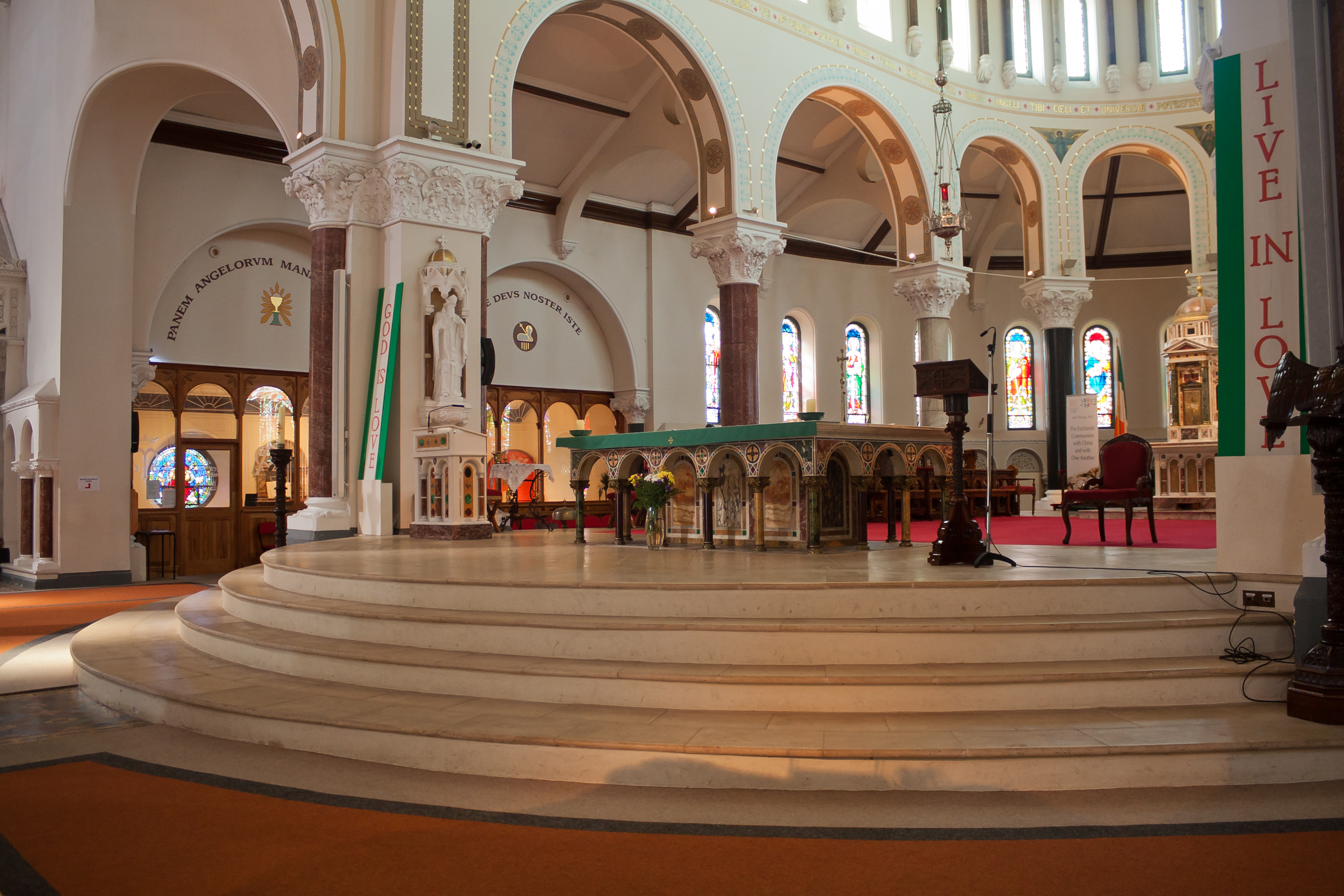
Altar

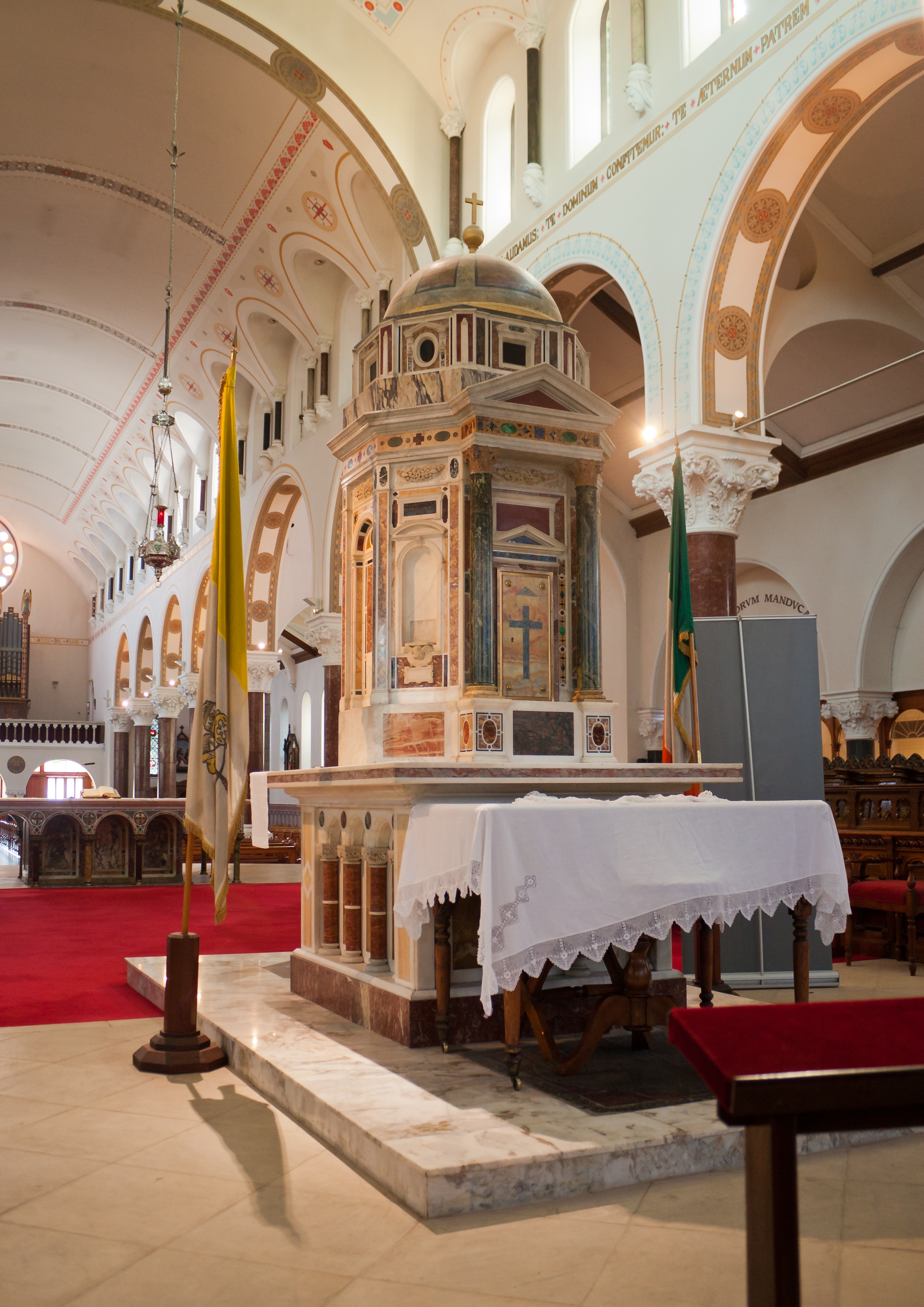
Tabernacle

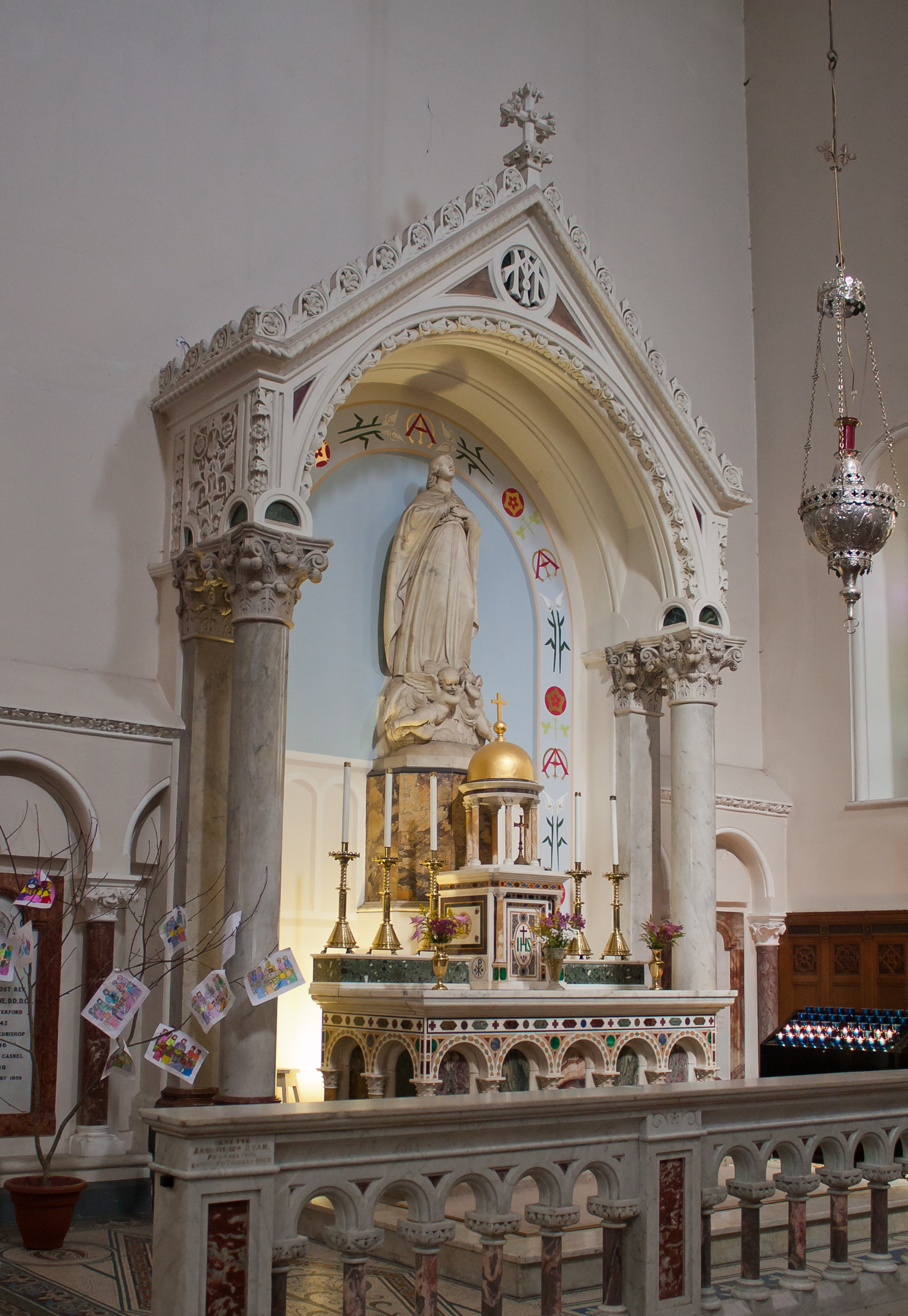
Altar to Mary

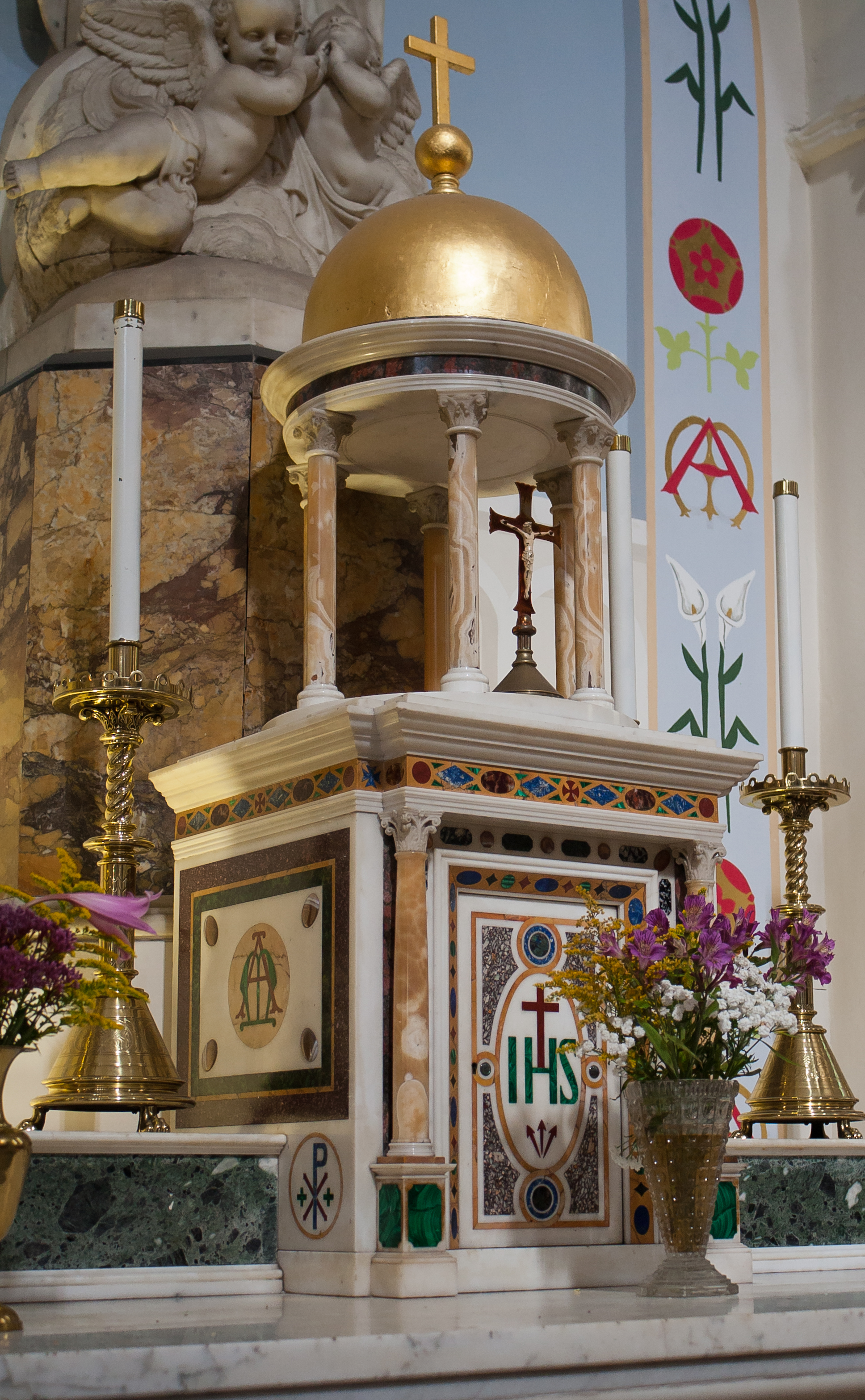
East Transept Tabernacle

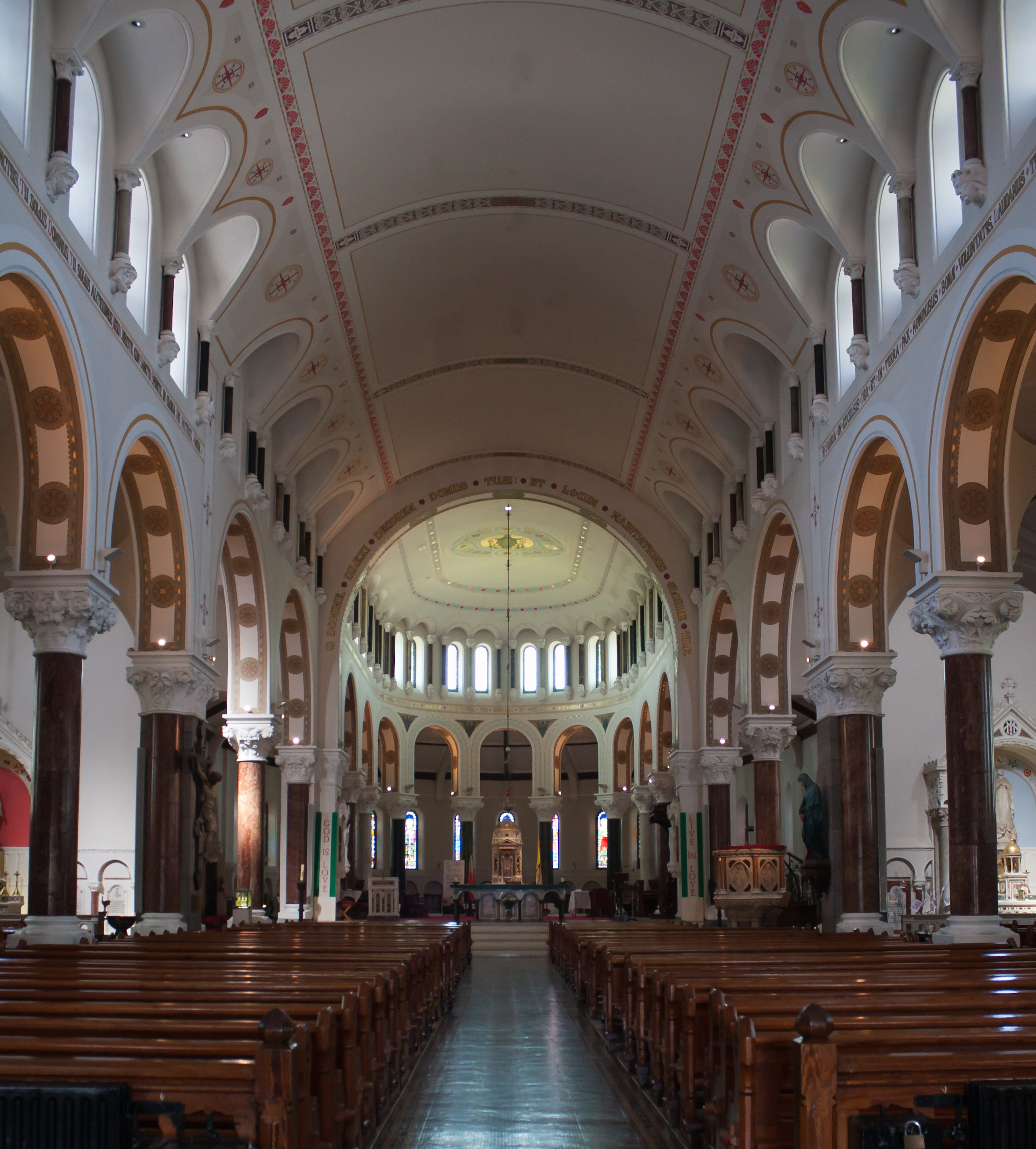
Nave

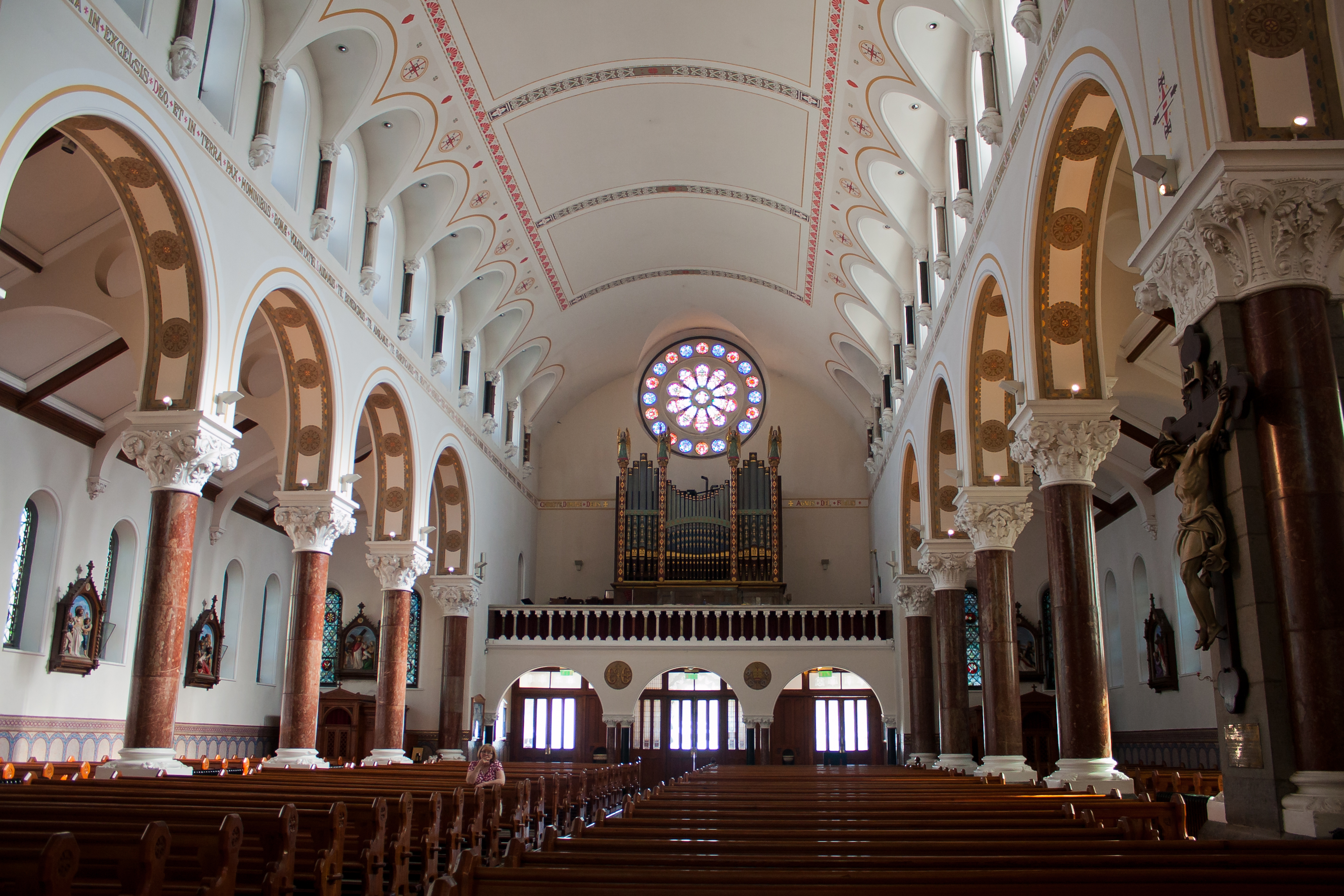
Nave

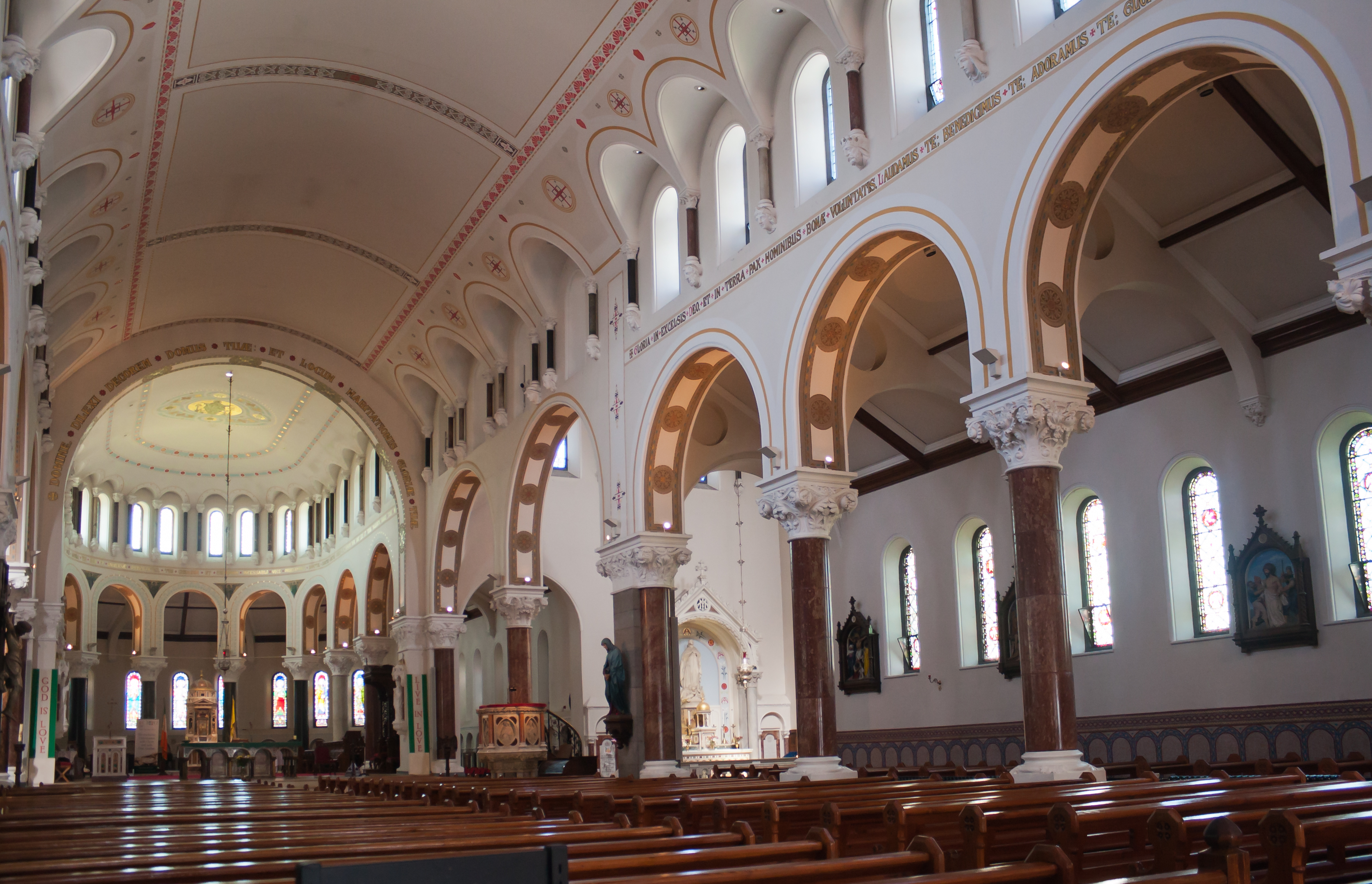
Nave towards east

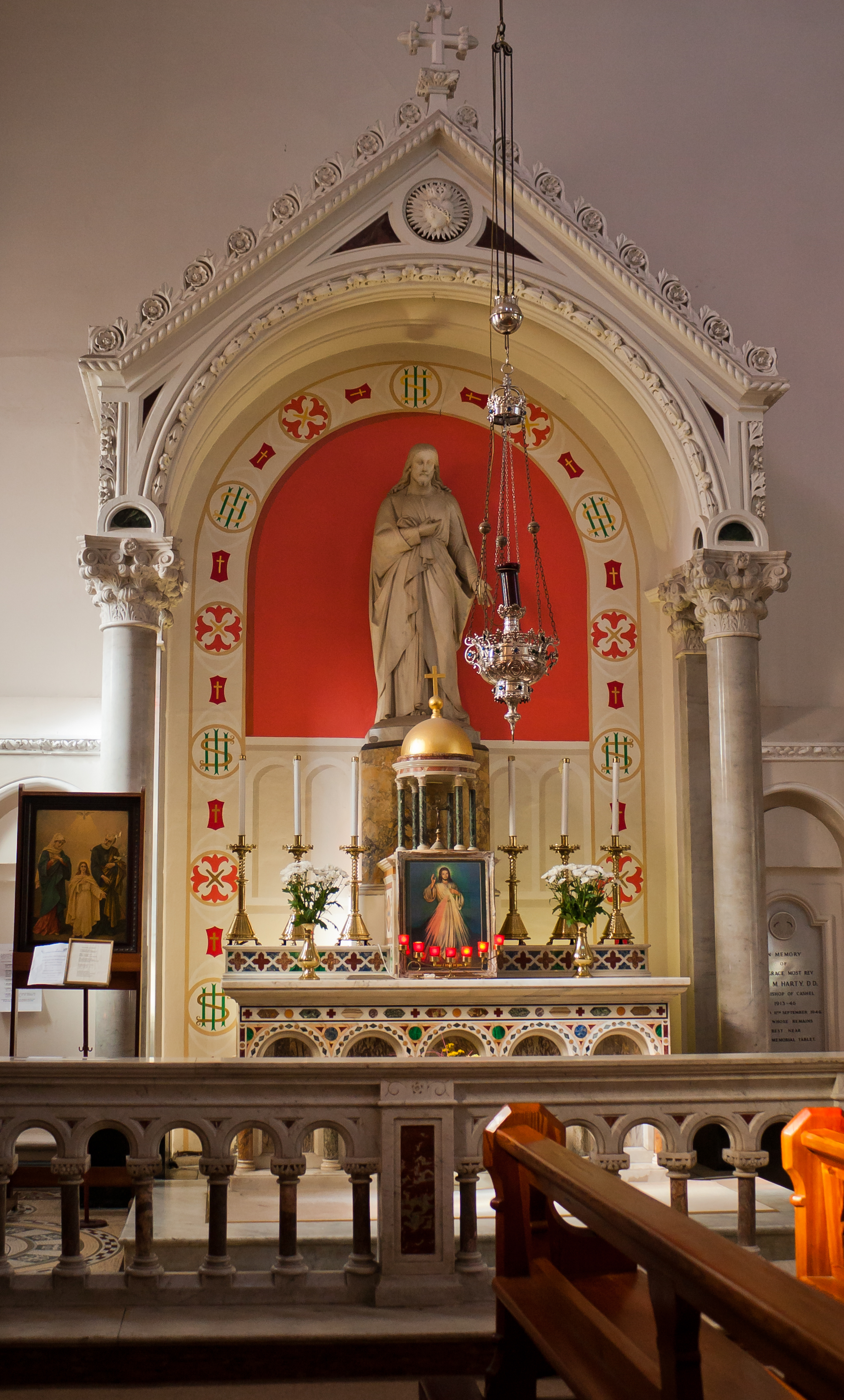
Altar to Christ

== See also ==
Archbishop of Cashel for a list of ordinaries of the See of Cashel and Emly.
