= Roman Catholic Archdiocese of Cashel and Emly =

Catholic archdiocese in Ireland

Coordinates: 52°40′44″N 7°48′50″W

Archdiocese of Cashel and Emly Archidioecesis Casheliensis et Emeliensis Ard-Deoise Chaisil agus Imligh

Catholic
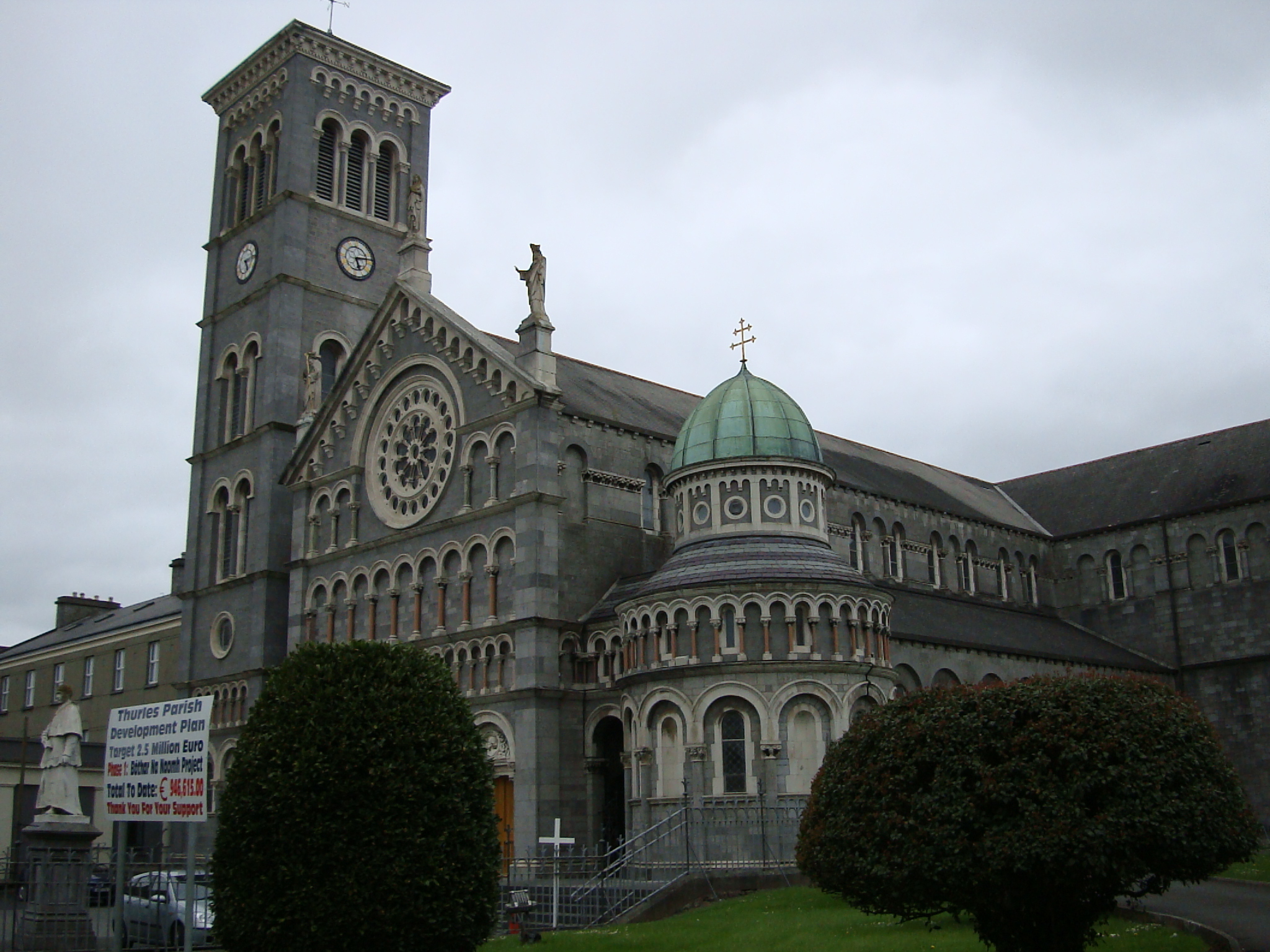
- Cathedral of the Assumption, Thurles

Location
- Country: Ireland
- Territory: Most of County Tipperary and part of County Limerick
- Ecclesiastical province: Cashel and Emly

Statistics
- Area: 1,190 sq mi (3,100 km^{2})
- Population: Total; Catholics: (as of 2018); 81,981; 79,505 (97.0%)
- Parishes: 46

Information
- Denomination: Catholic
- Sui iuris church: Latin Church
- Rite: Roman Rite
- Established: 26 January 2015
- Cathedral: Cathedral of the Assumption, Thurles
- Patron saint: Ailbe
- Secular priests: 77 (as of 2018)

Current leadership
- Pope: Leo XIV
- Metropolitan Archbishop: Kieran O'Reilly, Archbishop of Cashel and Emly
- Vicar General: Archdeacon Eugene Everard
- Bishops emeritus: Dermot Clifford, Archbishop of Cashel

Map
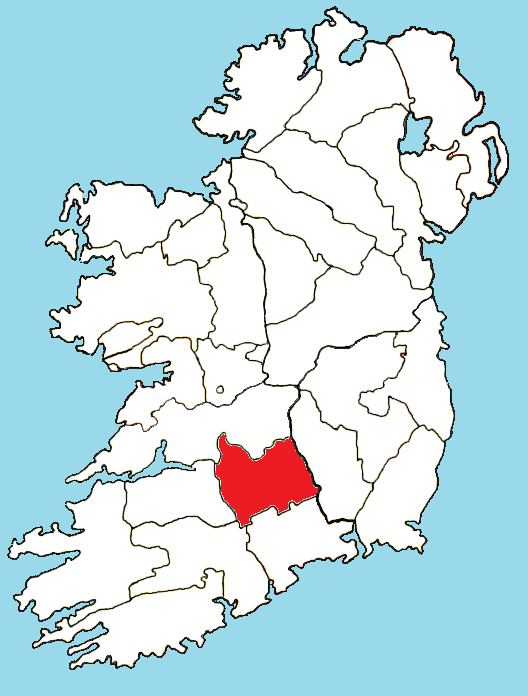

Website
- cashel-emly.ie

The Archdiocese of Cashel and Emly (Irish: Ard-Deoise Chaisil agus Imligh) is a Latin diocese of the Catholic Church located in mid-western Ireland, and the metropolis of the eponymous ecclesiastical province. The cathedral church of the archdiocese is the Cathedral of the Assumption in Thurles, County Tipperary. The incumbent archbishop, as of 2024, is Kieran O'Reilly.

== History ==
The original dioceses of Cashel and Emly were established by the Synod of Ráth Breasail in 1111.

=== Diocese of Cashel ===
The Diocese of Cashel was elevated to the rank of ecclesiastical province, which was roughly co-extensive with the traditional province of Munster, by the Synod of Kells in 1152. Since the Papal Legate, Giovanni Paparoni, awarded the pallium to Donat O'Lonergan in 1158, his successors ruled the ecclesiastical province of Cashel – also sometimes known as Munster – until 26 January 2015.

=== Diocese of Emly ===
The Diocese of Emly took its name from the eponymous village in County Tipperary, which was the location of the principal church of the Eóghanacht dynasty.

=== Archdiocese of Cashel and Emly ===
The original Roman Catholic dioceses of Cashel and Emly had been governed by the same bishop since 10 May 1718, with the Archbishop of Cashel acting as Apostolic Administrator of Emly, until they were united on 26 January 2015 to form the new metropolitan see of Cashel and Emly.

==== Church of Ireland ====
Following the Reformation in Ireland, the two Church of Ireland dioceses of Cashel and Emly were united in 1569. This union lasted until 1976, at which point the diocese of Cashel was merged into the Diocese of Cashel and Ossory, while the diocese of Emly was merged into the Diocese of Limerick and Killaloe.

== Geography ==
=== Ecclesiastical province ===
The ecclesiastical province is one of four that make up the Catholic Church in Ireland; the others being Armagh, Dublin, and Tuam.

The six suffragan dioceses of the province are:

- Cloyne
- Cork and Ross
- Kerry
- Killaloe
- Limerick
- Waterford and Lismore

=== Archdiocese ===
The archdiocese is divided into 46 parishes, which are spread across two counties: 35 in Tipperary and 11 in Limerick. The parishes were previously grouped into eight deaneries, but following a listening process led by Archbishop Kieran O'Reilly, the deaneries were reorganised into eleven Parish Pastoral Combinations, operative from 27 November 2022.

As of April 2018, there were 79 priests in the diocese.

Aside from the cathedral town of Thurles, the main towns in the diocese are Ballina, Caherconlish, Cashel, Fethard, Templemore and Tipperary.

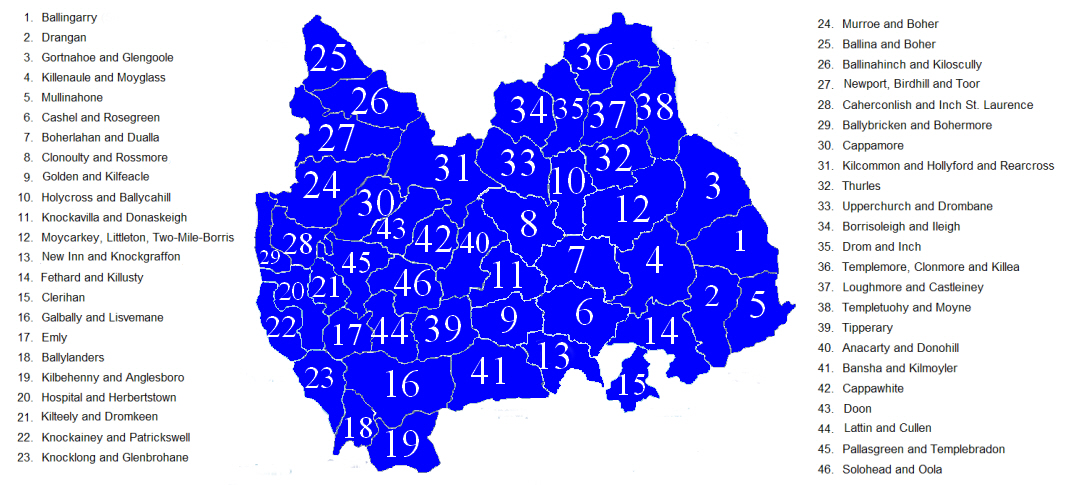
Parishes in Cashel and Emly

Pastoral combinations
- Ballylanders
- Galbally and Aherlow
- Kilbehenny and Anglesboro
- Knocklong and Glenbrohane
- Ballybricken and Bohermore
- Caherconlish and Inch St Laurence
- Hospital and Herbertstown
- Knockainey and Patrickswell
- Ballina and Boher
- Ballinahinch and Killoscully
- Murroe and Boher
- Newport, Birdhill and Toor
- Cappamore
- Cappawhite
- Doon
- Kilcommon, Hollyford and Rearcross
- Emly
- Kilteely and Dromkeen
- Lattin and Cullen
- Pallasgreen and Templebraden
- Anacarty and Donohill
- Bansha and Kilmoyler
- Oola and Solohead
- Tipperary
- Boherlahan and Dualla
- Clonoulty and Rossmore
- Holycross and Ballycahill
- Upperchurch and Drombane
- Cashel and Rosegreen
- Clerihan
- Golden and Kilfeacle
- Knockavilla and Donaskeigh
- New Inn and Knockgraffon
- Ballingarry
- Drangan and Cloneen
- Fethard and Killusty
- Killenaule and Moyglass
- Mullinahone
- Gortnahoe and Glengoole
- Moycarkey, Littleton and Two-Mile-Borris
- Templetuohy and Moyne
- Thurles
- Borrisoleigh and Ileigh
- Drom and Inch
- Loughmore and Castleiney
- Templemore, Clonmore and Killea

== Ordinaries ==
The following is a list of the ten most recent archbishops:

- Robert Laffan (1823–1833)
- Michael Slattery (1833–1857)
- Patrick Leahy (1857–1875)
- Thomas Croke (1875–1902)
- Thomas Fennelly (1901–1913)
- John Harty (1913–1946)
- Jeremiah Kinane (1946–1959)
- Thomas Morris (1959–1988)
- Dermot Clifford (1988–2014)
- Kieran O'Reilly (2014–present)

== See also ==
- Bishop of Emly
- Synod of Cashel
