= List of city and town halls in the Republic of Ireland =

This is a list of city and town halls in the Republic of Ireland. The list is sortable by building age and height, and, where relevant, provides a link to the record on the National Inventory of Architectural Heritage (NIAH) database, which is currently maintained by the Department of Housing, Local Government and Heritage.

Town or city	Building	Image	County	Built	Height	Notes
Athy	Athy Town Hall	More images	Kildare	1745		Recorded on the NIAH (11505332). Architect: Richard Cassels.
Bandon	Bandon Town Hall	More images	Cork	1863		Recorded on the NIAH (20844201). Architect: Richard Rolt Brash.
Belturbet	Belturbet Town Hall	More images	Cavan	1928		Recorded on the NIAH (40307017). Architect: Joseph Patrick Brady.
Birr	Birr Town Hall	More images	Offaly	1833		Recorded on the NIAH (14819209). Architect: Bernard Mullins.
Blackrock	Blackrock Town Hall	More images	Dublin	1905		Architect: George Luke O'Connor.
Bray	Bray Town Hall	More images	Wicklow	1884		Recorded on the NIAH (16301068). Architects: Thomas Newenham Deane and Guy Dawber.
Carlow	Carlow Town Hall	More images	Carlow	1886		Architect: William Hague.
Carrick-on-Suir	Carrick-on-Suir Town Hall	More images	Tipperary	1844		Recorded on the NIAH (22123017). Architect: Thomas Anthony.
Cashel	Cashel Town Hall	More images	Tipperary	1867		Recorded on the NIAH (22105040). Architect: James Edward Rogers.
Castlebar	Castlebar Town Hall	More images	Mayo	1790		Recorded on the NIAH (31209038).
Castleblayney	Castleblayney Town Hall	More images	Monaghan	1790		Recorded on the NIAH (41308026).
Cavan	Cavan Town Hall	More images	Cavan	1910		Recorded on the NIAH (40000161). Architect: William Alphonsus Scott.
Clonakilty	Clonakilty Town Hall	More images	Cork	1819		
Clones	Clones Town Hall	More images	Monaghan	1846		Recorded on the NIAH (41304053). Architect: William Deane Butler.
Clonmel	Clonmel Town Hall	More images	Tipperary	1882		Recorded on the NIAH (22117069).
Clontarf	Clontarf Town Hall	More images	Dublin	1896		Recorded on the NIAH (50030192). Architect: William George Perrott.
Cobh	Cobh Town Hall	More images	Cork	1806		Recorded on the NIAH (20827287). Architect: Alexander Deane.
Cork	City Hall, Cork	More images	Cork	1936		Recorded on the NIAH (20508003). Architects: Alfred Jones and Stephen Kelly of Dublin.
Dalkey	Dalkey Town Hall	More images	Dublin	1890		
Drogheda	The Tholsel, Drogheda	More images	Louth	1770		Recorded on the NIAH (13622030). Architect: George Darley of Dublin.
Dublin	City Hall, Dublin	More images	Dublin	1779	12.8 metres (42 ft)	Recorded on the NIAH (50910009). Architect: Thomas Cooley.
Dundalk	Dundalk Town Hall	More images	Louth	1764		Recorded on the NIAH (13705008). Architect: John Murray.
Dún Laoghaire	Dún Laoghaire Town Hall	More images	Dún Laoghaire–Rathdown	1880	37 metres (121 ft)	Architect: John Loftus Robinson.
Edenderry	Edenderry Town Hall	More images	Offaly	1830		Recorded on the NIAH (14804022). Architect: Thomas Duff.
Ennis	Ennis Town Hall	More images	Clare	1850		Recorded on the NIAH (20001390).
Enniscorthy	Enniscorthy Urban Council Offices	More images	Wexford	1795		Recorded on the NIAH (15603027).
Fethard	Fethard Town Hall	More images	Tipperary	1610		Recorded on the NIAH (22110021).
Galway	Old Town Hall, Galway	More images	Galway	1825		Recorded on the NIAH (30314012). Architect: Alexander Hay.
Kilkenny	The Tholsel, Kilkenny	More images	Kilkenny	1761		Recorded on the NIAH (12000061).
Killarney	Killarney Town Hall	More images	Killarney	1930		Recorded on the NIAH (21400829).
Kilrush	Kilrush Town Hall	More images	Clare	1808		Recorded on the NIAH (20301204).
Limerick	City Hall, Limerick	More images	Limerick	1990		Architects: Burke-Kennedy Doyle of Dublin.
Lismore	Lismore Town Hall	More images	Waterford	1815		Recorded on the NIAH (22809034). Architect: John Carr.
Macroom	Macroom Town Hall	More images	Cork	1820		Recorded on the NIAH (20852028). Architect: Albert William Barnard.
Mallow	Mallow Town Hall	More images	Cork	1930		Recorded on the NIAH (20815027).
Midleton	Midleton Town Hall	More images	Cork	1789		Recorded on the NIAH (20830110). Architect: John Morrison.
Monaghan	Monaghan Town Hall	More images	Monaghan	1880		Recorded on the NIAH (41303128).
Mullingar	Mullingar Town and County Buildings	More images	Mullingar	1913		Recorded on the NIAH (15310076). Architect: Arthur Edward Joyce.
Naas	Naas Town Hall	More images	Kildare	1796		
Navan	Navan Town Hall	More images	Meath	1831		Recorded on the NIAH (14009305). Architect: John Hargrave.
Nenagh	Nenagh Town Hall	More images	Tipperary	1889		Recorded on the NIAH (22305010). Architect: Robert Paul Gill.
Newbridge	Newbridge Town Hall	More images	Kildare	1860		Recorded on the NIAH (11818029).
New Ross	New Ross Town Hall	More images	Wexford	1750		Recorded on the NIAH (15605049). Architect: William Kent.
Pembroke	Pembroke Town Hall	More images	Dublin	1880		Architect: Edward Henry Carson.
Rathmines	Rathmines Town Hall	More images	Dublin	1896		Architect: Sir Thomas Drew.
Skibbereen	Skibbereen Town Hall	More images	Cork	1862		Recorded on the NIAH (20841073).
Sligo	Sligo Town Hall	More images	Sligo	1874		Recorded on the NIAH (32007030). Architect: William Hague.
Templemore	Templemore Town Hall	More images	Tipperary	1816		Recorded on the NIAH (22308037).
Tralee	Tralee Urban Council Chambers	More images	Kerry	1928		Recorded on the NIAH (21006373). Architect: Thomas Joseph Cullen.
Tuam	Tuam Town Hall	More images	Galway	1857		Recorded on the NIAH (30331029). Architect: James Joseph Boylan.
Tullamore	Tullamore Town Hall	More images	Offaly	1786		Recorded on the NIAH (14807035).
Waterford	City Hall, Waterford	More images	Waterford	1783		Recorded on the NIAH (22504135). Architect: John Roberts.
Westport	Westport Town Hall	More images	Mayo	1903		
Wexford	Wexford Town Hall	More images	Wexford	1776		Recorded on the NIAH (15502021).
Wicklow	Wicklow Town Hall	More images	Wicklow	1690		
Youghal	Youghal Town Hall	More images	Cork	1779		Recorded on the NIAH (20823149).

== See also ==
- List of city and town halls in Northern Ireland
