= List of city and town halls in Northern Ireland =

This is a list of city and town halls in Northern Ireland. The list is sortable by building age and height and provides a link to the listing description where relevant. The list, which was compiled using the list of 1,000 Largest Cities and Towns in the UK by Population, published by The Geographist, to ensure completeness, includes nearly 30 surviving buildings. Notable examples of buildings which have not survived include Strabane Town Hall. The oldest purpose-built town hall is Donaghadee Town Hall, thought to have been completed in around 1770. The tallest is Belfast City Hall which has a dome which rises to 173 feet (53 m).

Town or city	Building	Image	County	Built	Height	Notes
Armagh	Archbishop's Palace	More images	County Armagh	1770		Grade A listed ("HB 15/18/016".). Architects: Thomas Cooley of London and Francis Johnston.
Ballyclare	Ballyclare Town Hall	More images	County Antrim	1855	18.3 metres (60 ft)	Grade B2 listed ("HB 21/05/004".).
Ballymena	Ballymena Town Hall	More images	County Antrim	1928		Grade B1 listed ("HB 07/16/019".). Architects: Jones and Kelly.
Ballymoney	Ballymoney Town Hall	More images	County Antrim	1866		Grade B1 listed ("HB 04/15/006".).
Ballynahinch	Ballynahinch Town Hall	More images	County Down	1795		Grade B1 listed ("HB18/07/005".).
Banbridge	Old Town Hall, Banbridge	More images	County Down	1834		Grade B1 listed ("HB 17/06/009".). Architect: Michael McGavigan.
Bangor	Bangor Town Hall	More images	County Down	1852		Grade A listed ("HB 23/07/001".). Architect: William Burn.
Belfast	Belfast City Hall	More images	County Antrim	1906	53 metres (174 ft)	Grade A listed ("HB 26/50/001".). Architect: Brumwell Thomas.
Belfast	Old Town Hall, Belfast	More images	County Antrim	1871		Grade B1 listed ("HB26/50/044".). Architect: Anthony Jackson.
Carrickfergus	Carrickfergus Town Hall	More images	County Antrim	1779		Grade B+ listed ("HB 22/08/008".). Architect: Richard Drew.
Coleraine	Coleraine Town Hall	More images	County Londonderry	1859		Grade B1 listed ("HB 03/18/001".). Architect: Thomas Turner.
Derry	Derry Guildhall	More images	County Londonderry	1890		Grade A listed ("HB 01/19/038".). Architect: John Guy Ferguson.
Donaghadee	Donaghadee Town Hall	More images	County Down	1770		Grade B+ listed ("HB 24/07/004".).
Downpatrick	Downpatrick Town Hall	More images	County Down	1882		Grade B1 listed ("HB 18/19/001".). Architect: William Batt.
Dromore	Dromore Town Hall	More images	County Down	1886		Grade B1 listed ("HB 17/15/010".).
Ederney	Ederney Town Hall	More images	County Fermanagh	1839		Grade B1 listed ("HB 12/14/005".). Architect: William Deane Butler.
Enniskillen	Enniskillen Town Hall	More images	County Fermanagh	1901		Grade B+ listed ("HB 12/17/001".). Architect: William Alphonsus Scott.
Larne	Larne Town Hall	More images	County Antrim	1870		Grade B+ listed ("HB 06/12/002".). Architect: Alexander Tate.
Limavady	Limavady Town Hall	More images	County Londonderry	1872		Formerly Grade B1 listed ("HB 02/12/004".). Architects: Turner & Williamson.
Lisburn	Lisburn Town Hall	More images	County Antrim	1884		Grade B2 listed ("HB 19/13/018".).
Lurgan	Lurgan Town Hall	More images	County Armagh	1868		Grade B1 listed ("HB 14/23/030".). Architect: William Raffles Brown.
Newry	Newry Town Hall	More images	County Down	1894		Grade B1 listed ("HB 16/28/018 B".). Architect: William Batt.
Newtownards	Market House, Newtownards	More images	County Down	1771		Grade B+ listed ("HB 24/13/001".). Architect: Ferdinando Stratford.
Newtownstewart	Newtownstewart Town Hall	More images	County Tyrone	1880		Grade B2 listed ("HB10/04/045 B".).
Portadown	Portadown Town Hall	More images	County Armagh	1890		Grade B1 listed ("HB 14/14/014".). Architects: Robert and Thomas Roe.
Portrush	Portrush Town Hall	More images	County Antrim	1872		Grade B+ listed ("HB 03/10/001".). Architects: Lanyon, Lynn and Lanyon.
Portstewart	Portstewart Town Hall	More images	County Londonderry	1934		Grade B2 listed ("HB 03/08/007".). Architect: Benjamin Cowser.

== See also ==
- List of city and town halls
- List of city and town halls in the Republic of Ireland
