= Cashel Extension Railway =

Railway in Ireland

Coordinates: 52°31′17″N 7°54′0″W

Cashel Extension Line
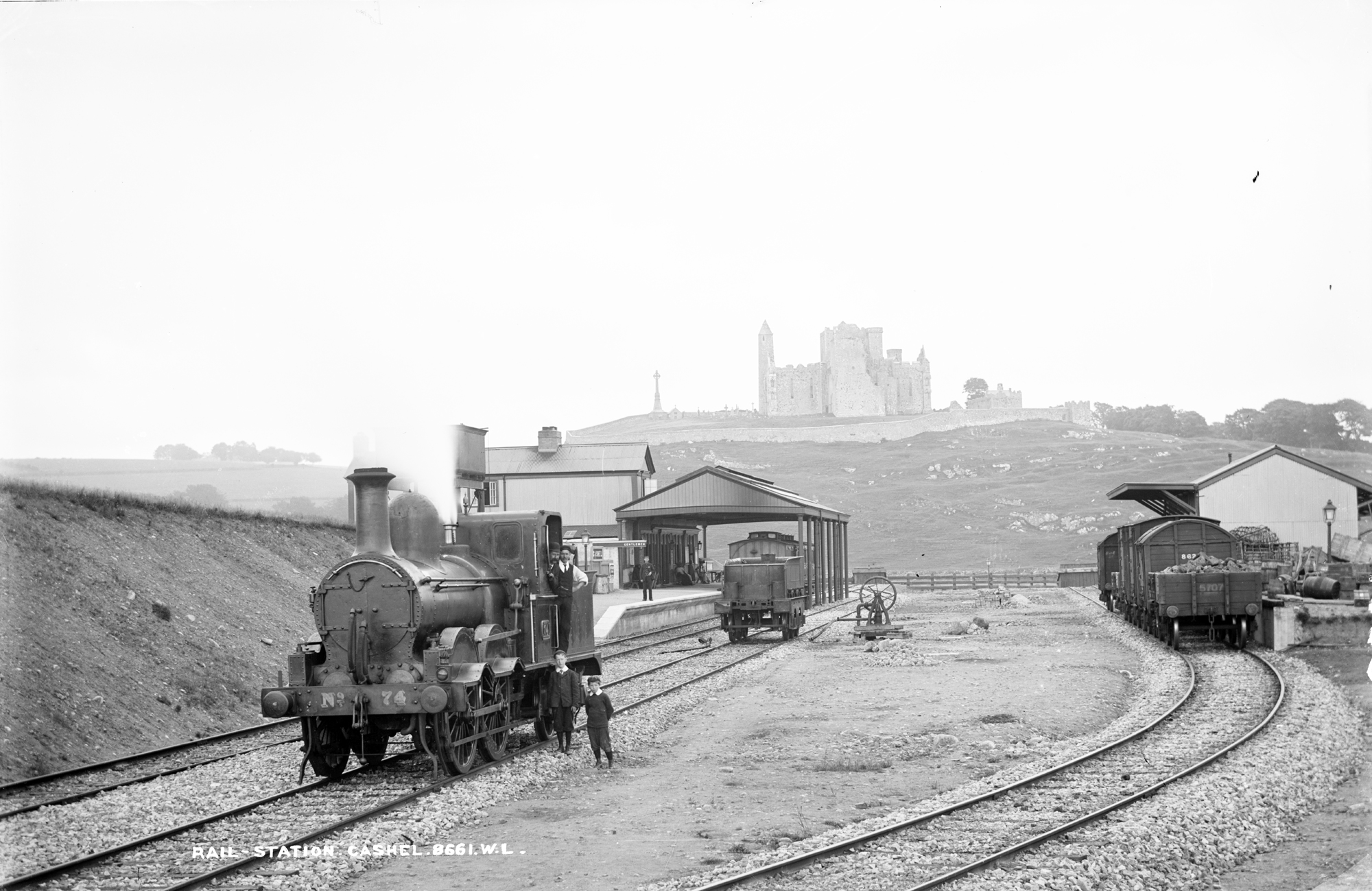
- Cashel Railway Station

Overview
- Status: Closed (infrastructure removed)
- Termini: Goolds Cross; Cashel
- Stations: 3

History
- Opened: 19 December 1904
- Closed: 1 January 1954

The Cashel Extension Railway, or the Cashel Spur Line, was an old line connecting Cashel to the Dublin-Cork railway. It opened in 1904, with passenger and later freight services running until its closure in 1954.
