= Strabane =

Town in County Tyrone, Northern Ireland

Coordinates: 54.83°N 7.47°W

Strabane: Irish: An Srath Bán
- Town
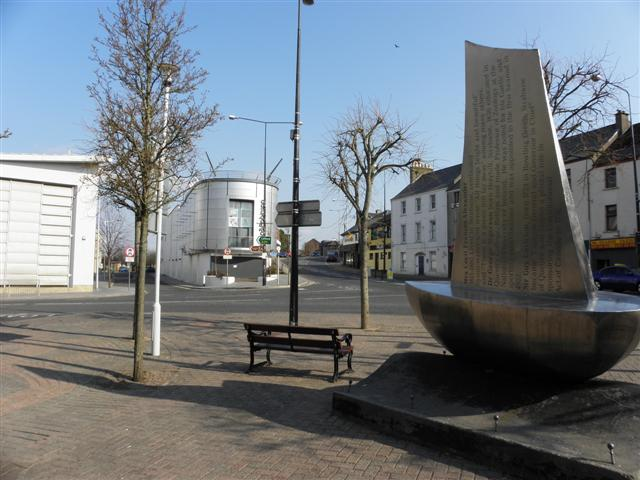
- The Square, town centre of Strabane

- Location within Northern Ireland
- Population: 13,507 (2021 census)
- District: Derry and Strabane
- County: County Tyrone
- Country: Northern Ireland
- Sovereign state: United Kingdom
- Post town: STRABANE
- Postcode district: BT82
- Dialling code: 028
- Police: Northern Ireland
- Fire: Northern Ireland
- Ambulance: Northern Ireland
- UK Parliament: West Tyrone
- NI Assembly: West Tyrone
- Website: www.derrystrabane.com

Strabane (/strəˈbæn/; from Irish An Srath Bán, meaning 'the white river-holm') is a town in County Tyrone, Northern Ireland.

Strabane had a population of 13,507 at the 2021 census. It lies on the east bank of the River Foyle. It is roughly midway from Omagh, Derry and Letterkenny. The River Foyle marks the border between Northern Ireland and the Republic of Ireland. On the other side of the river (across Lifford Bridge) is the smaller town of Lifford, which is the county town of Donegal. The River Mourne flows through the centre of the town and meets the Finn to form the Foyle River. A large hill named Knockavoe, which marks the beginning of the Sperrin Mountains, forms the backdrop to the town.

== History ==
=== Early history ===
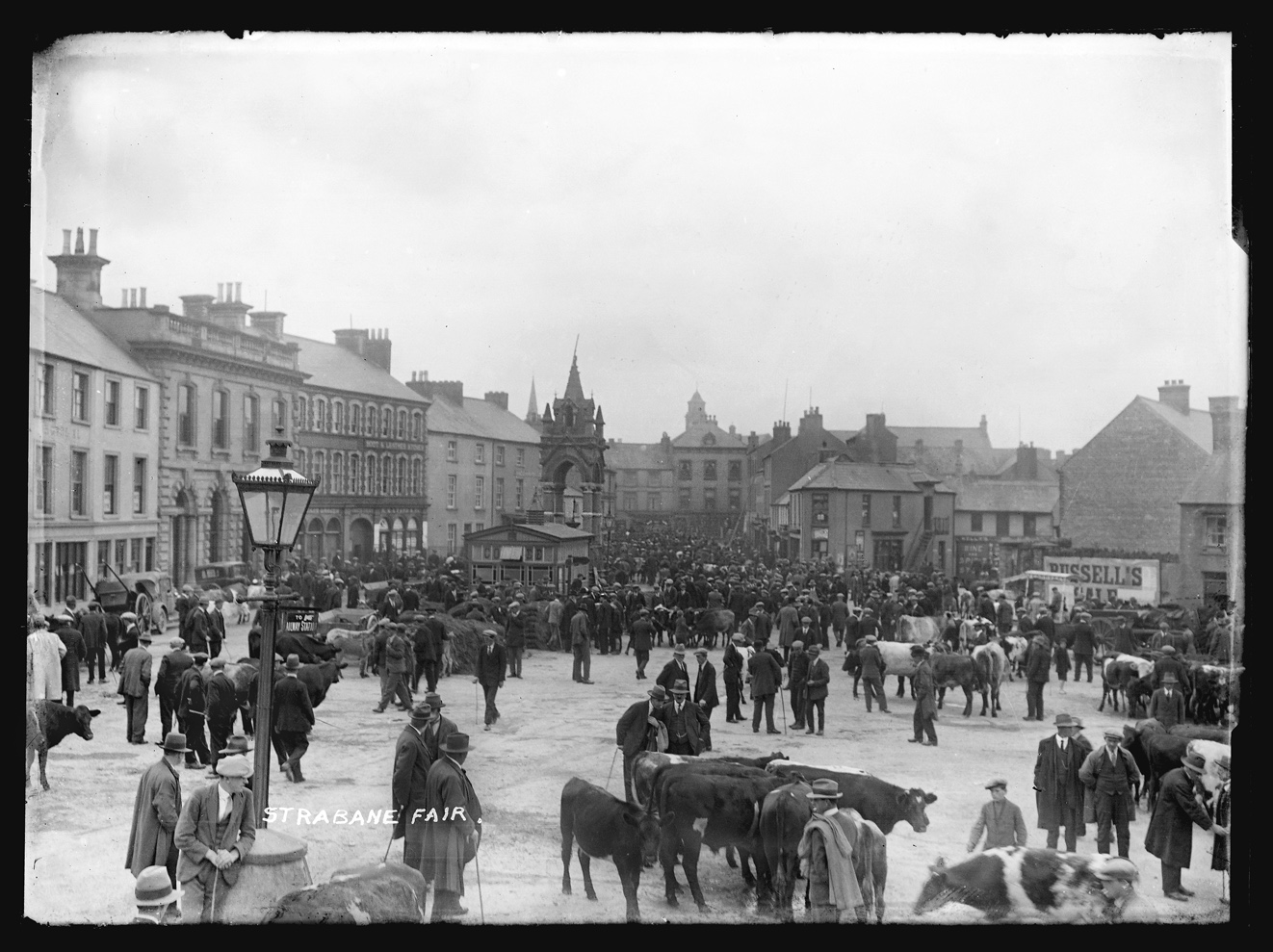
Photograph of Strabane Fair by Herbert F. Cooper, c. 1910 (PRONI)

The locale was home to a group of northern Celts known as the Orighella as far back as the fourth century when the territories of Owen (later Tír Eoghain) and Connail (later Tír Chonaill - mostly modern County Donegal) were established, and Orighella were assimilated into the Cenél Conaill. With the arrival of Saint Patrick, a mission established a church in the area near Castlefin, and having visited the Grianán Aileach for the conversion of Owen, returned along the Foyle river, establishing a further church at Leckpatrick (the name means 'the flagstone of St. Patrick'). A later church was established at Lifford/Clonleigh by a mission headed by St. Colmcille. In AD 586 St. Colgan established a monastery at Camus [from whence the parish of Camus-Juxta-Mourne gets its name]. Other monasteries and religious sites were established at this time at Urney, Ballycolman, Donagheady, and Artigarvan.

=== Middle Ages ===
Vikings arrived at Lifford in AD 832 and maintained a presence on the Foyle until AD 863 when they were expelled by Áed Findliath. The regional seat of power was to be the Grianán Aileach until 1101, when it was destroyed by the O'Briens of Thomond, and was then moved to Urney, three miles outside Strabane. In 1243, the seat of power for all Tyrone and the O'Neill dynasty was moved to Cookstown. It was during this epoch, in AD 1231, that Franciscan friars established a religious foundation on what is now the old graveyard at St. Patrick's Street, Strabane.

=== Seventeenth century ===
The town was settled by Scottish families in the 1600s, an action that preceded the Plantation of Ulster. In 1608, during O'Doherty's Rebellion, most of the inhabitants fled to the safety of the fort of Lifford following Sir Cahir O'Doherty's Burning of Derry and Burning of Strabane.

=== Twentieth century ===
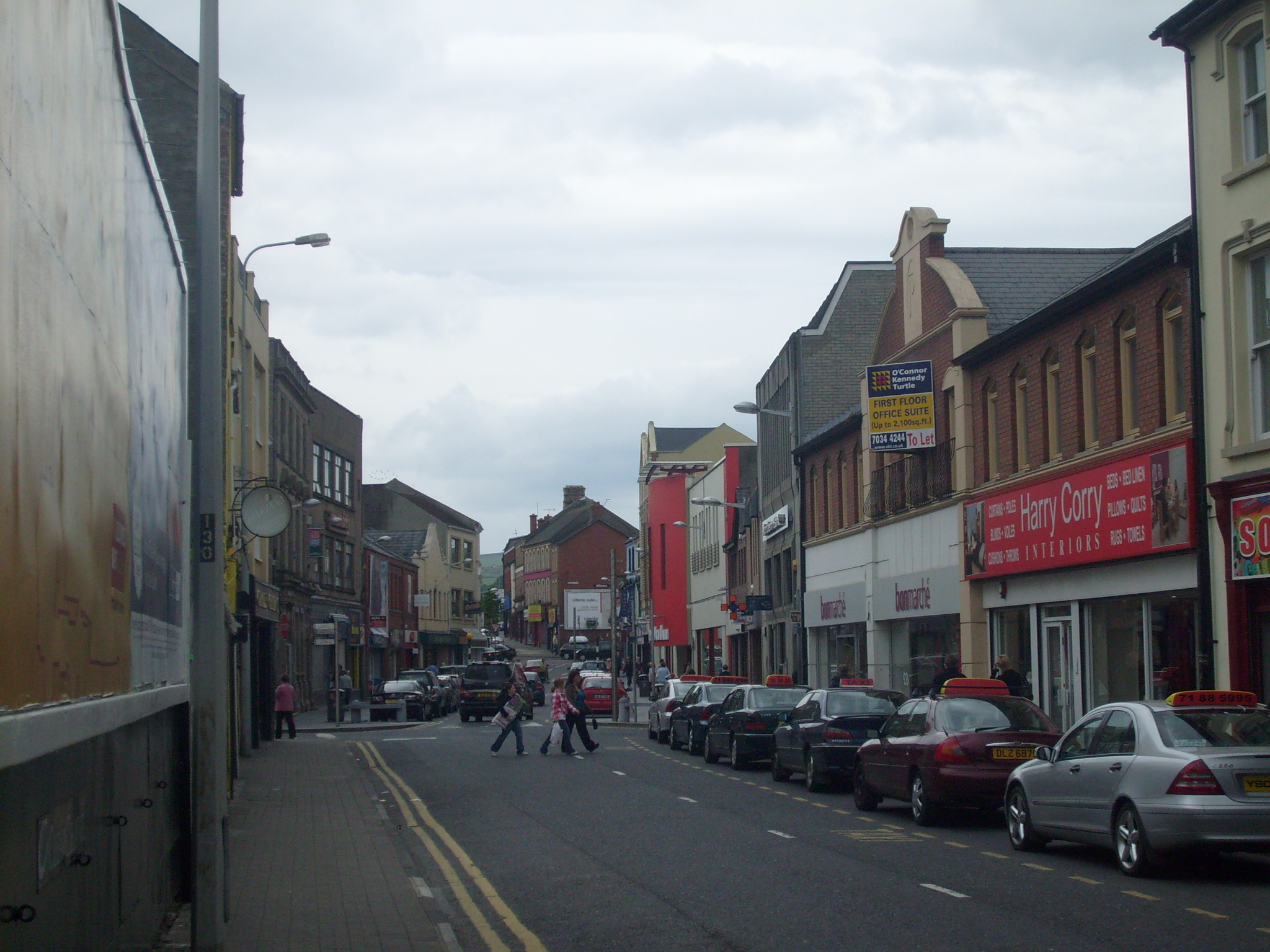
Main Street, Strabane

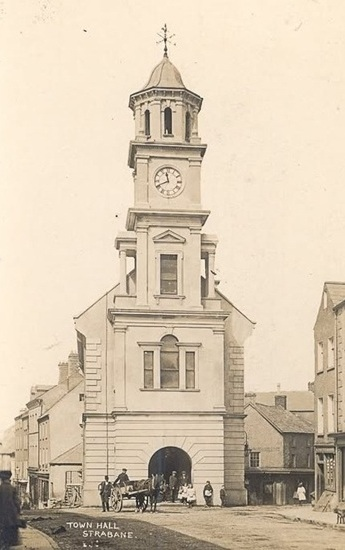
Strabane Town Hall

In 1921, Strabane became a border town following the partition of Ireland. Sitting directly astride the border, Strabane suffered extensive damage during the Troubles from the early 1970s: Strabane Town Hall was destroyed in a bomb attack in 1972. The damage continued throughout much of the 1990s, with bombings and shootings commonplace; Irish Republican paramilitary groups, mainly the Provisional Irish Republican Army, regularly attacked the town's British Army and Royal Ulster Constabulary (RUC) bases. Strabane was once the most bombed town in Europe in proportion to its size, and was the most bombed town in Northern Ireland.

Many civilians and members of the security forces were killed or injured in the area over the course of the Troubles. Many British Army regiments from England, Scotland and Wales served in Strabane at various times during the Troubles in the barracks at the locally named "Camel's hump" beside Lifford Bridge. As a result of the Good Friday Agreement, there is no longer any British Army presence in the town. Strabane became involved in the Ulster Project International, sending Catholic and Protestant teenagers to the United States for prejudice-reduction work.

At the height of The Troubles, Strabane garnered the dubious distinction of the highest unemployment rate in the industrial world. It is one of the most economically deprived towns in the United Kingdom. Huge economic damage occurred when much of the town centre flooded in 1987.

In August 2005, a Channel 4 television programme presented by property experts Kirstie Allsopp and Phil Spencer named Strabane the eighth-worst place to live in the UK, largely owing to unemployment. Strabane had been moved out of the top 20 in the 2007 edition.

As a result, the Strabane Community Unemployed Group was founded to find solutions to long-term unemployment and combat the causes of unemployment. Sister Mary Carmel Fanning, a retired Catholic girls school principal who had been awarded the MBE for her services to education in 1997, became a director of the group later that year.

== Transport ==
=== Railways ===
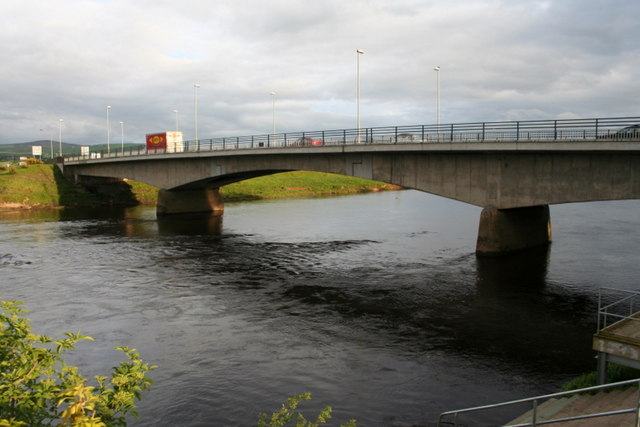
The Lifford Bridge, linking Lifford in the Republic and Strabane in the North

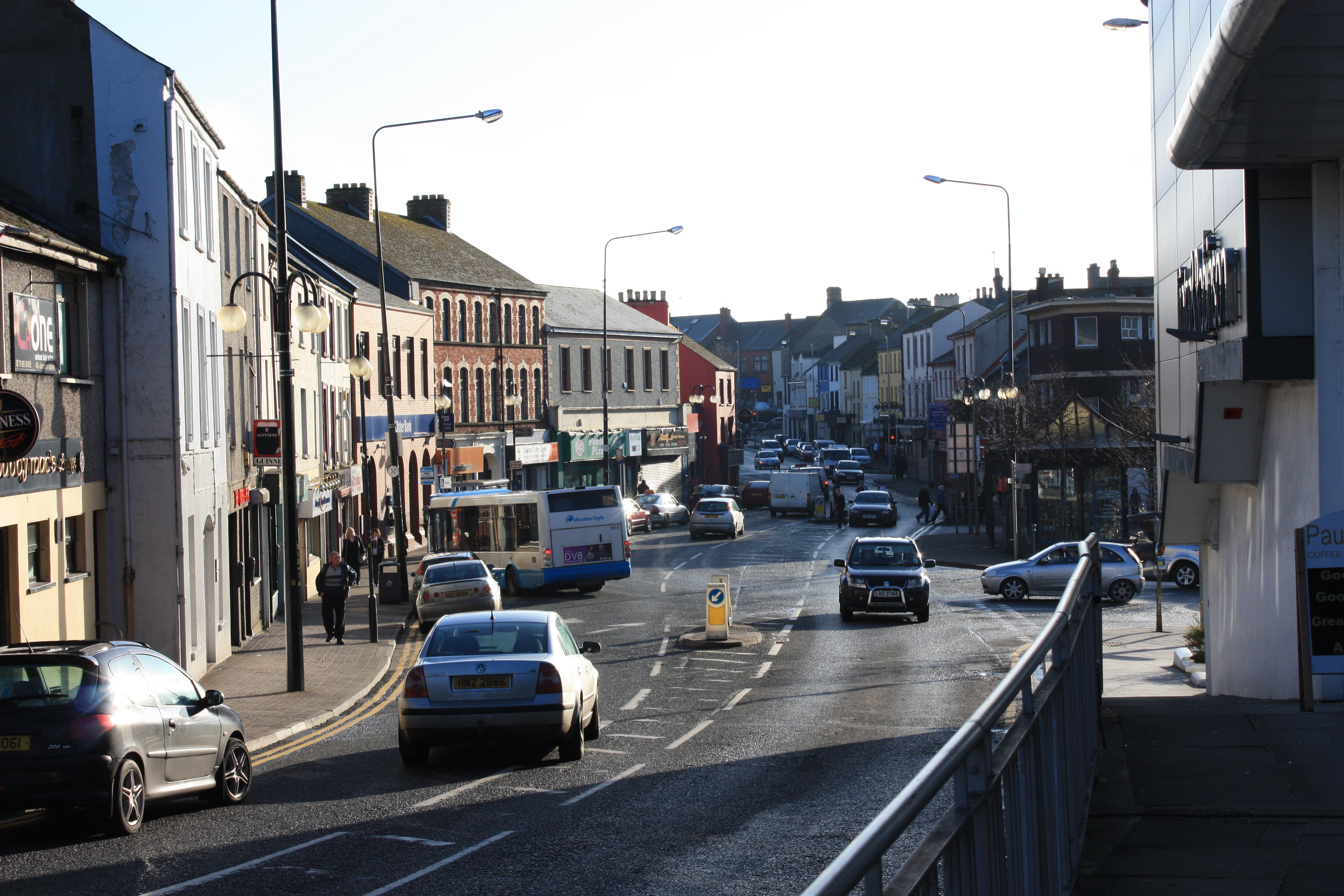
Abercorn Square, Strabane

The Irish gauge 5 ft 3 in (1,600 mm) Londonderry and Enniskillen Railway (L&ER) reached Strabane in 1847, Omagh in 1852 and Enniskillen in 1854. The Great Northern Railway (Ireland) took over the L&ER in 1883.

The Finn Valley Railway (FV) opened from Strabane to Stranorlar in 1863. The FV was originally Irish gauge but in 1892 it merged with the 3 ft (914 mm) narrow gauge West Donegal Railway (WD) to form the Donegal Railway and was reduced to the same narrow gauge for through running. The Donegal Railway opened its own line to Derry in 1900. In 1906 the GNR and Northern Counties Committee jointly took over the Donegal Railway, making it the County Donegal Railways Joint Committee. The 3 ft (914 mm) gauge Strabane and Letterkenny Railway opened in 1909 and was worked by the Joint Committee.

The partition of Ireland in 1922 turned the boundary with County Donegal into an international frontier. This changed trade patterns to the railways' detriment and placed border posts on the Joint Committee's FV and S&L lines and on the GNR line to Derry. Stops for customs inspections greatly delayed trains and disrupted timekeeping. Over the next few years customs agreements between the two states enabled GNR trains between Strabane and Derry to pass through the Free State without inspection unless they were scheduled to serve local stations on the west bank of the Foyle, and for goods on all railways to be carried between different parts of the Free State to pass through Northern Ireland under customs bond. The Joint Committee's Strabane-Derry line was closed in 1954, followed by the remainder of the narrow gauge system in 1960. In 1958 the Ulster Transport Authority took over the remaining GNR lines on the Northern Ireland side of the border. In accordance with The Benson Report submitted to the Northern Ireland Government in 1963, the UTA closed the former GNR line through Strabane to Derry in 1965.

Little trace remains of Strabane's railways except for one old railway building that survives in the town. The nearest railway is operated by Northern Ireland Railways and runs from Derry~Londonderry railway station via Coleraine to Belfast Lanyon Place railway station and Belfast Grand Central station. The Belfast-Derry railway line has been upgraded to facilitate more frequent trains.

== Demographics ==
National Identity of Strabane residents (2021)
Nationality	Per cent
Irish	67.4%
Northern Irish	25.1%
British	8.4%

=== 2021 census ===
On census day 2021, there were 13,507 people living in Strabane. Of these:

- 20.93% were aged under 16, 62.89% were aged between 16 and 65, and 16.18% were aged 66 and over;
- 51.83% of the usually resident population were female and 48.17% were male;
- 91.96% (12,241) belong to or were brought up in the Catholic faith, 5.46% (738) belong to or were brought up in a 'Protestant and Other Christian (including Christian related)' denominations, 0.65% (88) belong to other religions and 1.92% (260) had no religious background.
- 6.77% only identified as 'British', 63.98% only identified as 'Irish', 21.60% only identified as 'Northern Irish', 0.4% identity as 'both Irish and British', 0.64% identified as 'both British and Northern Irish', 2.39% identified as 'both Irish and Northern Irish', 0.38% identified as 'Irish, British and Northern Irish', and 3.83% identified as 'Other';
- 19.57% had some knowledge of Irish (Gaeilge), and 2.65% had some knowledge of Ulster-Scots;

=== 2011 census ===
On census day 2011 (27 March 2011), there were 13,172 people living in Strabane (5,123 households), accounting for 0.73% of the NI total, representing a decline of 2.2% on the census 2001 population of 13,456. Of these:

- 23.00% were aged under 16 years and 13.19% were aged 65 and over;
- 52.32% of the usually resident population were female and 47.68% were male;
- 91.57% belong to or were brought up in the Catholic Christian faith and 7.22% belong to or were brought up in a 'Protestant and Other Christian (including Christian related)' denominations;
- 56.03% had an Irish national identity, 33.54% had a Northern Irish national identity and 12.03% had a British national identity (respondents could indicate more than one national identity);
- 36 years was the average (median) age of the population;
- 17.43% had some knowledge of Irish (Gaeilge) and 3.49% had some knowledge of Ulster-Scots.

== Politics ==
As of 2015, Strabane and Derry councils joined to form Derry City and Strabane District Council, and have a strong nationalist majority.

Following the 2023 Derry City & Strabane District Council elections, Strabane which is part of Sperrin DEA currently has 3 SF Councillors, 1 DUP, 3 Independents.

In Derg DEA, Sinn Fein currently have 3 Councillors, UUP and DUP 1 councillor each.

The next council elections will take place in May 2027.

Since 1997 Strabane has been part of the United Kingdom parliamentary constituency of West Tyrone, held since 2001 by Sinn Féin. From 1983 to 1997 it was part of the Foyle constituency, held during that time by the then-SDLP leader John Hume.

Strabane has also since 1997, been part of the West Tyrone constituency of the Northern Ireland Assembly with the current composition of West Tyrone MLA's being:

SF 3 seats DUP 1 seat SDLP 1 seat

The next Assembly election is scheduled to take place in May 2027.

== Culture ==
=== Sport ===
The local Gaelic football team is Strabane Sigersons.

Strabane Cricket Club and Fox Lodge Cricket Club are members of the North West Senior League.

Strabane Athletic F.C. play in the NIFL Championship.

The town has three golf courses prominent among which is the 18-hole Strabane Golf Course.

Angling has historically been popular in the Strabane area. The town and immediate countryside is served by several rivers, with lough fishing at Moorlough and Lough Ash. Strabane is situated at the confluence of the rivers Mourne and Finn where they meet to form the Foyle. Strabane Glen, a steep wooded gorge adjacent to the town, is a designated ASSI (Area of Special Scientific Interest).

=== Irish language ===
Strabane has an Irish-medium nursery, Naíscoil an tSratha Báin, which was founded in 1994, and a Gaelscoil (primary school).

A common greeting in Strabane and the wider North West is "Have ye any bars?" This means "What's the news?" or "What's the latest gossip?" This may derive from Irish, from the phrase "barr nuachta," meaning "titbit," referring to a tasty piece of news.

=== Music and arts ===
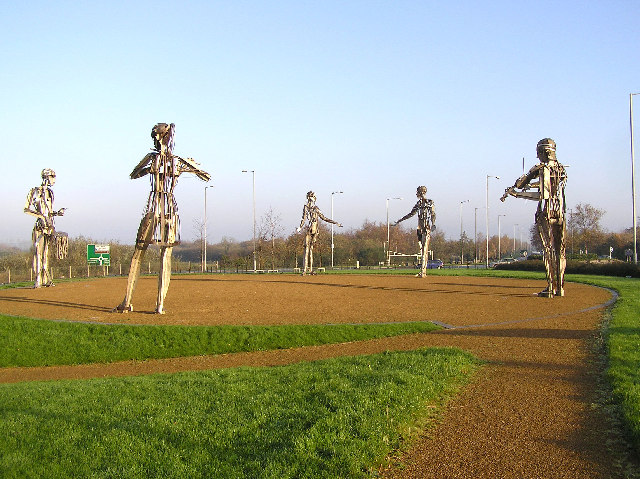
The sculpture known locally as The Tinnies on the outskirts of Strabane, beside the roundabout near the Lifford turn-off

In 2007, the Alley Arts and Conference Centre (designed by architects Glenn Howells and AJA) opened to the general public, offering a 270-seat theatre, art gallery, tourist information centre and cafe-bar. The venue was Northern Ireland Building of the Year in 2008, and won the Allianz Arts and Business Award 2009 and the Green Apple Award 2008. It has also hosted the All Ireland Confined Drama Finals (2008), the North West Music Festival, the Stage Write Schools Drama Festival, Sounds Like Summer Music Festival, Strabane Drama Festival, and the Johnny Crampsie Music Festival.

Strabane plays host to a Saint Patrick's Day Parade each year. One of Strabane's most notable features are five 20 ft (6.1 m) steel structures on the banks of the river. Designed by Maurice Harron, they consist of two dancers and a fiddle player on the Lifford side, a flute player on the Strabane side and a drummer in the middle.

== Religion ==
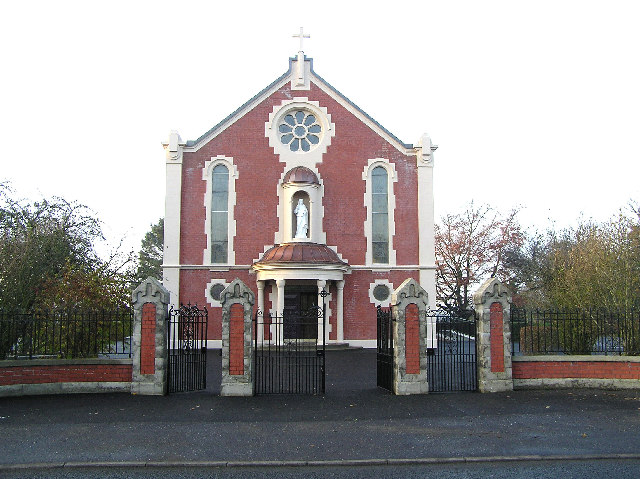
Sacred Heart Roman Catholic church.

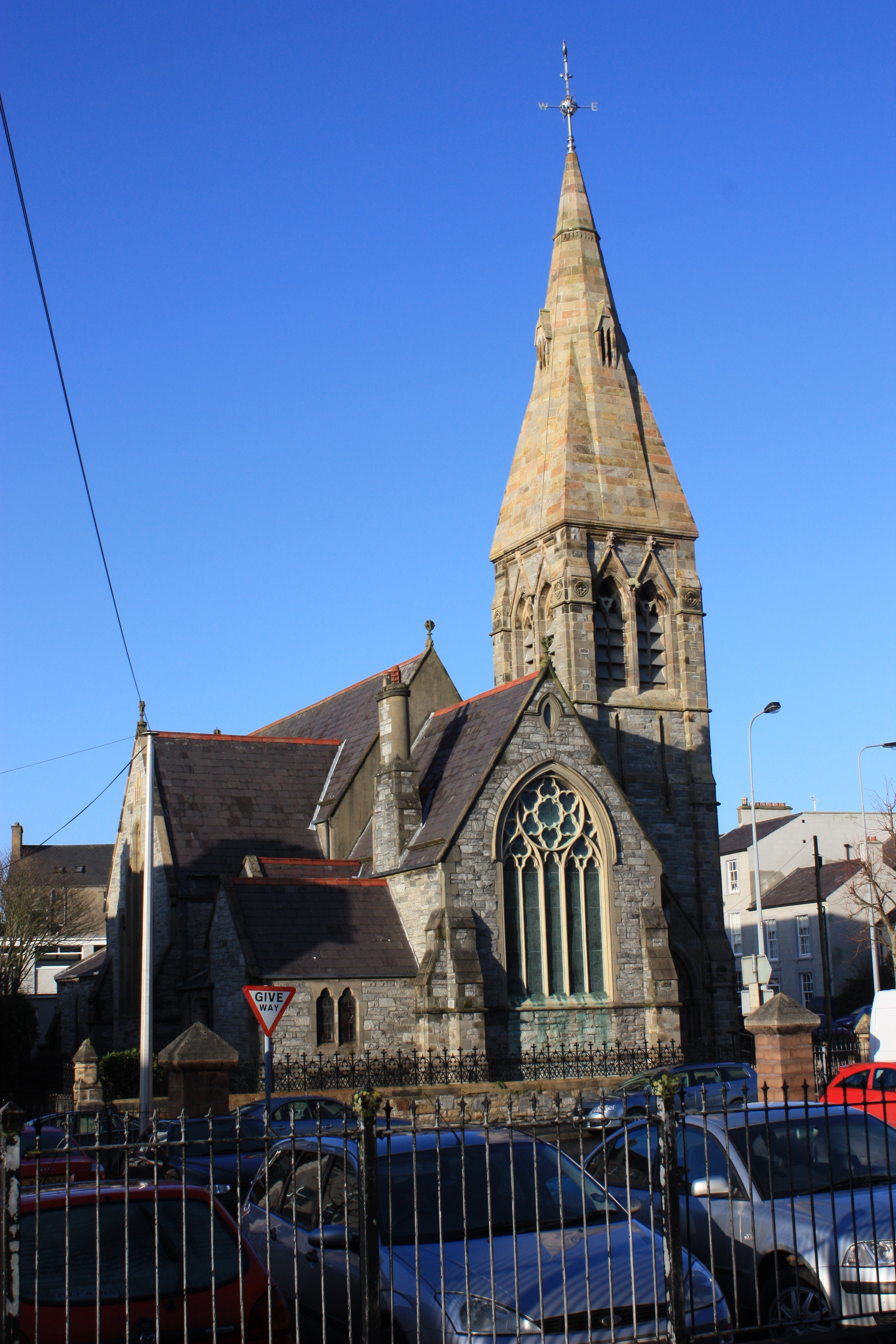
Christ Church (Church of Ireland) in Strabane

According to the 2011 census, 91.57% of the residents were from a Catholic background and 7.22% were from a Protestant background. There are a number of places of worship for the residents of Strabane and the surrounding district. The three main Catholic churches are the Church of the Immaculate Conception, Barrack Street, Sacred Heart Church, Derry Road and St. Mary's Church, Melmount Road.

The main Church of Ireland church is Christ Church, Bowling Green. The main Presbyterian Church is located on the Derry Road while the main Methodist Church is located on Railway Street.

== Education ==
There are a number of infant, primary and secondary schools in the Strabane area. The central location of the town allows parents the choice of schools in Derry, Omagh and Donegal.

There are two secondary schools in the town: Holy Cross College and Strabane Academy. Holy Cross College was created in 2003 with the amalgamation of Strabane's three Catholic post-primary schools, the Convent Grammar School, St Colman's High School and Our Lady of Mercy High School. The college had been operating across the three sites until its new £29 million building opened in September 2009, catering for 1,400 pupils. Holy Cross is a co-ed bilateral college, which means it offers grammar status education within an all-ability school. It is regarded as a "blueprint for the future of education in Northern Ireland" because it caters for both academic and vocational paths. The other secondary school is Strabane Academy which was formed in 2011 when Strabane Grammar School merged with Strabane High School.

The North West Regional College, which has campuses in Derry, Limavady as well as Strabane, offers a range of vocational and non-vocational courses for post 16 year olds.

== Places of interest ==
The National Trust owns a Strabane shop in which John Dunlap learnt the printing trade. Dunlap went on to print the United States Declaration of Independence.

Dergalt, the ancestral home of Woodrow Wilson, 28th President of the United States, is near Strabane. On 8 May 2008 it was severely damaged by a fire.

In 2014, a mural was painted in Townsend Street with the intention of showing support for the people of Palestine following Israeli military action in Gaza.

== Communications ==
Strabane transmitting station is a broadcasting and telecommunications facility owned and operated by Arqiva. It includes a 305.5 metre (1,002 ft) high guyed steel lattice mast, which is the tallest structure in Ireland. The transmission antennas surmounting the structure are contained within a fibreglass cylinder. Constructed in 1963, it came into service on 18 February of that year.

== Notable people ==
- Paul Brady, singer-songwriter
- William Burke, 19th century serial killer, from Urney, a Strabane townland
- Sir Guy Carleton (Lord Dorchester), Governor of the Province of Quebec & Governor General of British North America
- Declan Curry, BBC One correspondent
- Adrian Doherty, former footballer for Manchester United and Derry City FC
- Kathleen Dolan, RTÉ Radio's first female radio announcer
- Ryan Dolan, singer for Ireland at the Eurovision Song Contest 2013
- Brian Dooher, member of the 2003, 2005 and 2008 All-Ireland winning Tyrone Gaelic football teams.
- Hugo Duncan, popular entertainer and BBC Radio Ulster presenter
- John Dunlap, printer of the United States Declaration of Independence
- Andrew Frederick Gault (1833–1903), merchant, industrialist, and philanthropist known as the Cotton King of Canada.
- Matthew Hamilton Gault, financier and politician at Montreal
- Matthew Holmes, New Zealand runholder and politician
- Niamh Houston, better known as Chipzel, is a musician known for her 8-bit music
- Annie Russell Maunder, astronomer
- Pearse McAuley, IRA member jailed for the killing of Detective Garda Jerry McCabe
- Flann O'Brien, best known pseudonym of Brian O'Nolan, 20th century bilingual (but Irish-mother-tongue) satirist and humourist.
- Stephen O'Neill, member of the Tyrone Gaelic football team.
- Robert Patterson (1792–1881), Irish-American major general
- Rory Patterson, Football striker currently playing for Derry City F.C. in the Irish League of Ireland.
- Dr George Sigerson, Gaelic activist; namesake of the Sigerson Cup.
- H.G. Simms, Chairman of the Shanghai Municipal Council (1922–23)
- Robert Welch, photographer and conchologist

== See also ==
- List of localities in Northern Ireland by population
- Strabane (barony)
