= Theatre De Luxe =

- Address: 85-86 Camden Street; Dublin; Ireland
- Capacity: 1,395
- Type: Cinema
- Screen: 1
- Current use: Hotel and night Club

Construction
- Opened: 1912
- Closed: 1975
- Rebuilt: 1920
- Architect: Frederick Hayes

The Theatre De Luxe was a film theatre on Camden Street in Dublin, Ireland from 1912 to 1975.

== History ==
The original cinema was opened by Maurice Elliman, a Jew who escaped the pogroms in Eastern Europe. The first building was designed by Frederick Hayes, MRIAI, and built by George Squire & Co. It was enlarged and rebuilt in 1920.

The exterior was remodelled in Art deco style in 1934.

The cinema had a 16-foot by 23-foot screen. It had a capacity of 1,395 seats.

The cinema closed in 1975, and it was planned to use the building as an Irish language theatre for Gael Linn, but this fell through. It became a snooker hall in 1979. The upper room of the building was used for the rehearsal room scenes in the 1991 film The Commitments. The building is now a hotel (Hotel De Luxe) and a night-club.
