= City Hall, Cork =

Municipal building in Cork city, Ireland

- Halla na Cathrach, Corcaigh
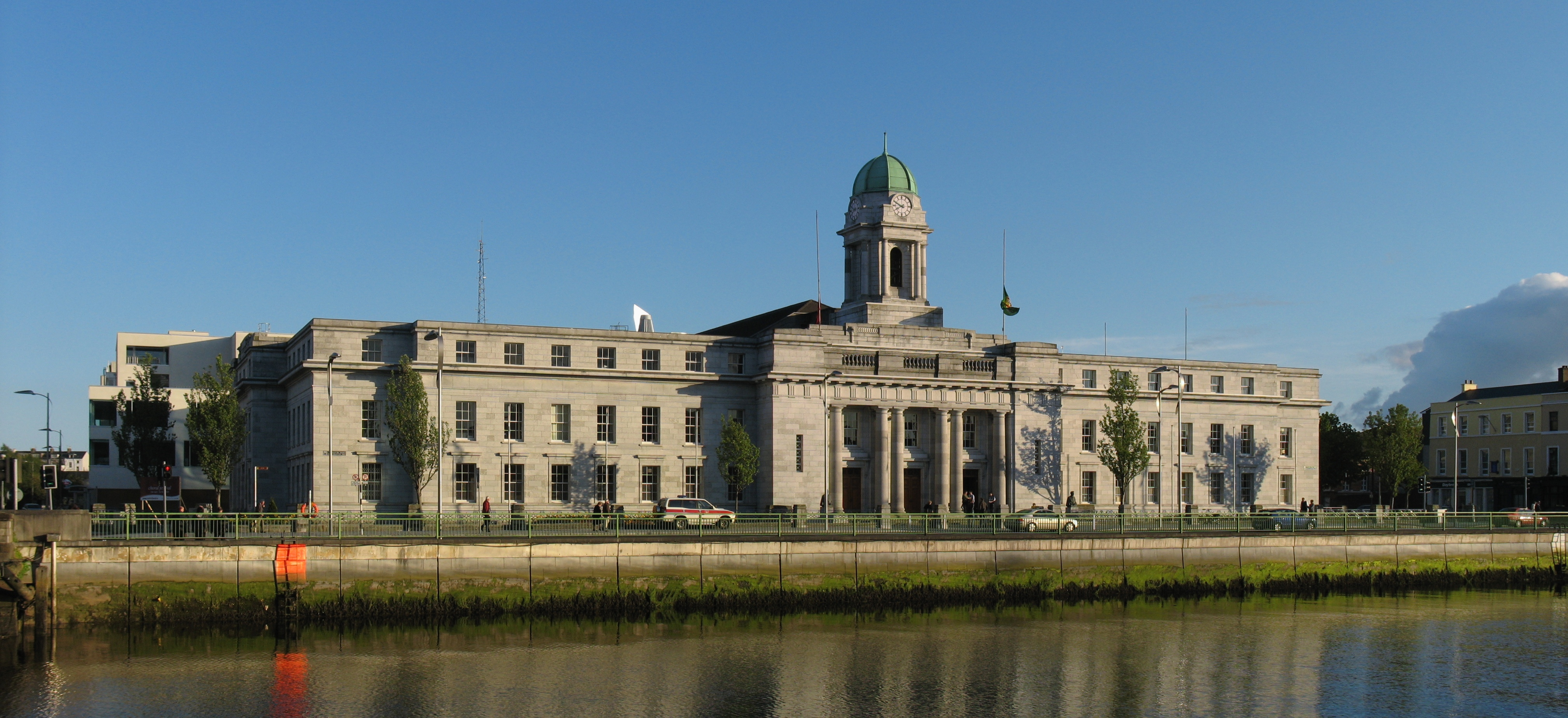
- Cork City Hall, as viewed from Lapp's Quay
- Interactive map of the City Hall, Cork area

General information
- Location: Albert Quay, Cork, Ireland
- Coordinates: 51.8971°N 8.4654°W
- Construction started: 1932
- Completed: 1936

Design and construction
- Architects: Alfred Jones; Stephen Kelly
- Main contractor: John Sisk & Son

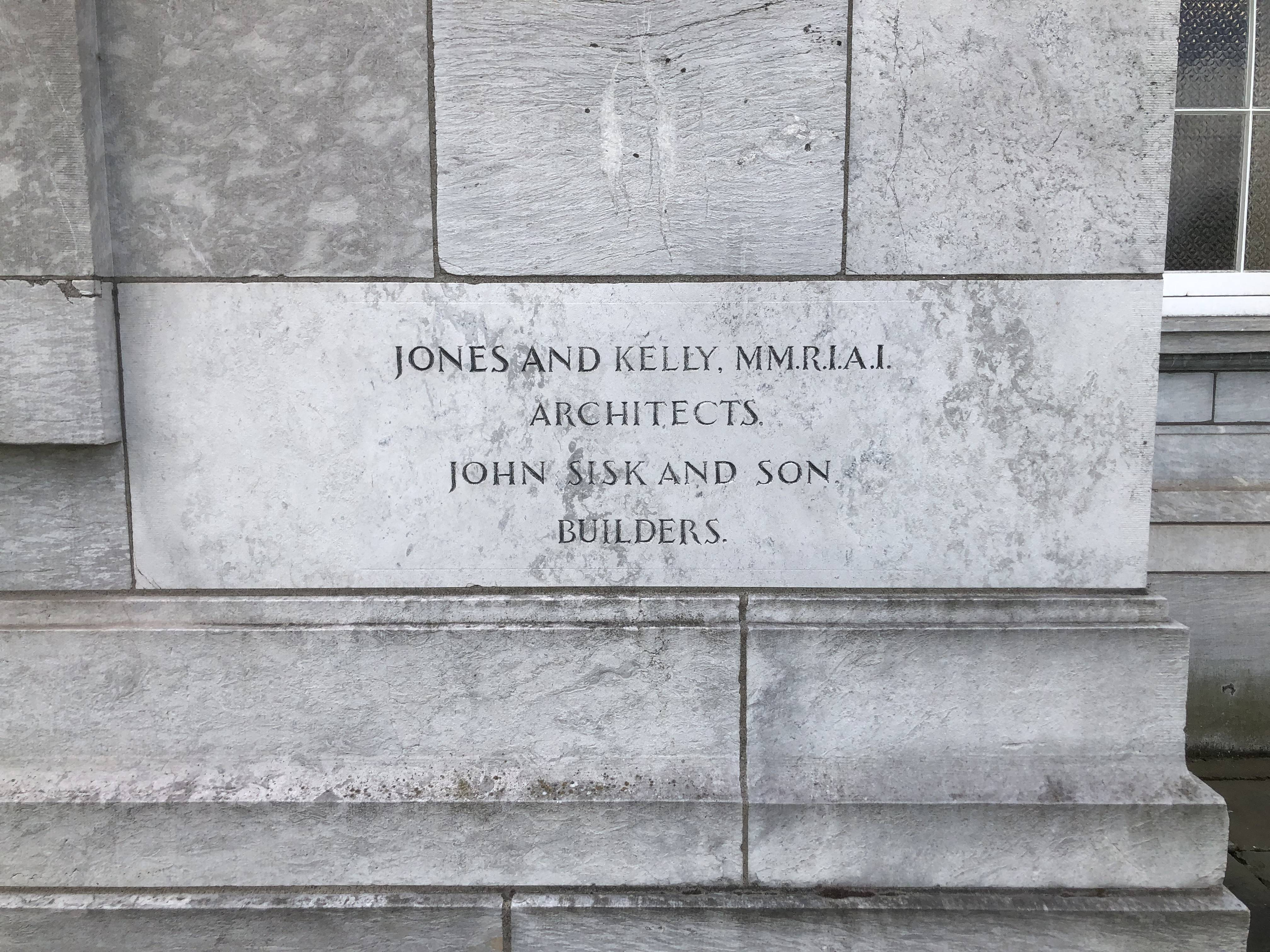
A stone on the Eglinton Street side of the building, bearing the name of the architects and the builders

The City Hall, Cork (Irish: Halla na Cathrach, Corcaigh) is a civic building in Cork, Ireland which houses the administrative headquarters of Cork City Council.

== History ==
The current building was commissioned to replace the old City Hall which had started life as a corn exchange. The old City Hall was designed by Cork architect Henry Hill in the neoclassical style, built by Sir Thomas Deane in ashlar stone and was completed in 1843. In 1852 the building was altered by Sir John Benson to facilitate the Cork Exhibition, opening on 10 June 1852. Following the closure of a second exhibition in 1883, the building was converted for public use. It was offered to the Cork Corporation at a price of IR£10,000 and, following the passing of the Cork Corn Markets Act 1889, it became property of the Corporation in 1893. The building was opened to the public as a city hall in roughly 1903, and a brass plaque commemorating this event is on display in the Cork Public Museum. The old city hall was destroyed on 11 December 1920 by the Black and Tans during the Irish War of Independence as part of the Burning of Cork.

In the late 1920s, the civic leaders decided to rebuild City Hall. Following a design competition, designs by Alfred Jones and Stephen Kelly (Jones and Kelly architects, based in Dublin) were selected, and the construction contract for the replacement civic buildings awarded to John Sisk & Son. The foundation stone of the new City Hall building was laid by Éamon de Valera on 9 July 1932. The cost of this new building was provided by the British Government in the 1930s as a gesture of reconciliation. On 24 April 1935, Cork Corporation held a meeting in the new hall for the first time, when the Council Chambers were first opened. The City Hall was officially opened by de Valera on 8 September 1936.

== Architecture ==
The structure's entry in the National Inventory of Architectural Heritage describes it as one of the city's "monumental classical buildings" and its site as important. Unlike the original city hall, the current building originally didn't bear the city arms on its exterior, though it does feature mosaics of the arms contemporaneous with the building's construction on both the floor of the entrance hall and also on the tympanum above the stage of the concert hall. In 1985, as part of commemorations of the 800th year of the Cork Charter, a limestone plinth bearing the arms was erected outside the building.

A major extension was completed by ABK Architects in 2007 and opened that year.

== See also ==
- List of public art in Cork
