= Cashel, County Tipperary =

Town in County Tipperary, Ireland

Cashel Irish: Caiseal
- Town
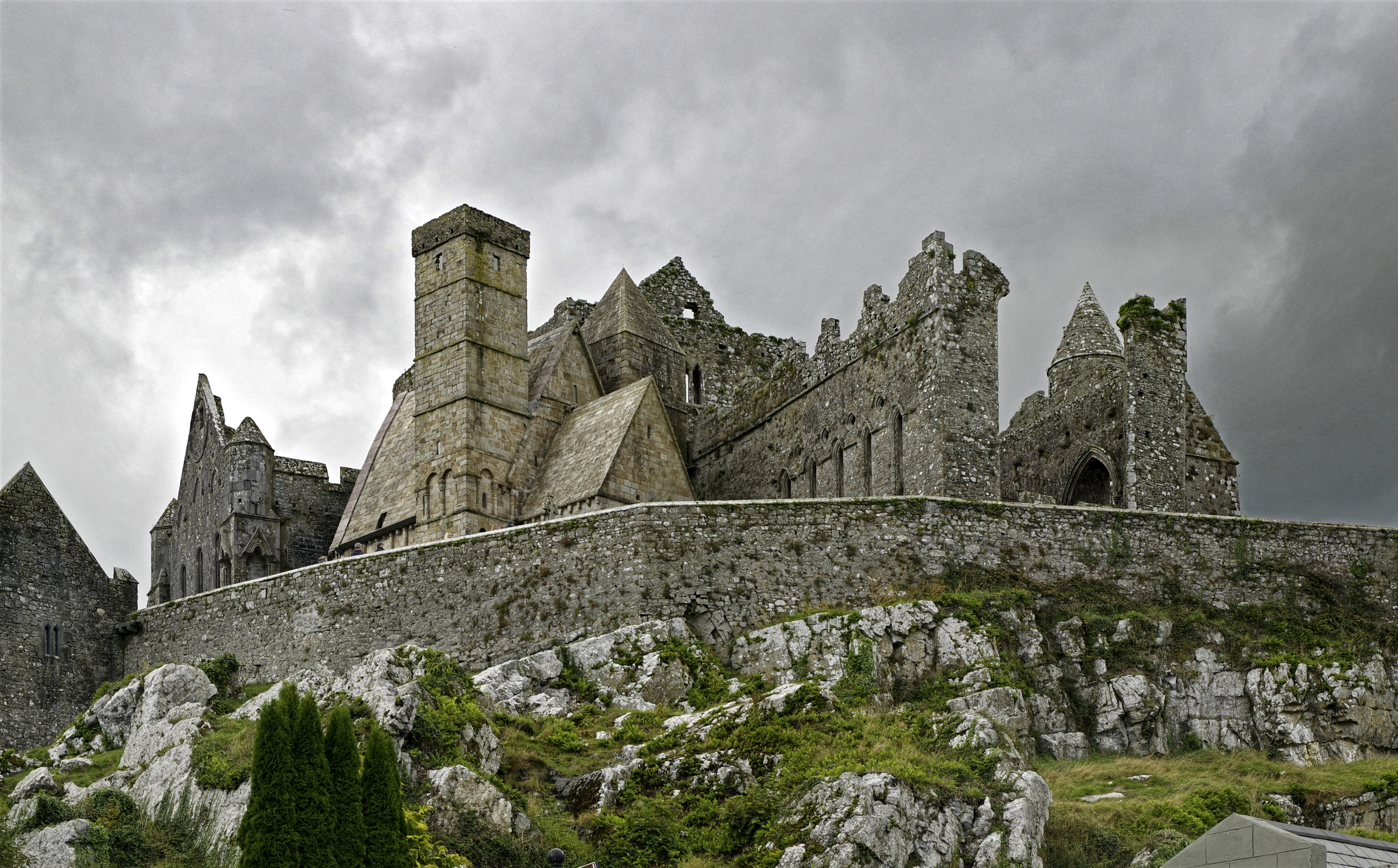
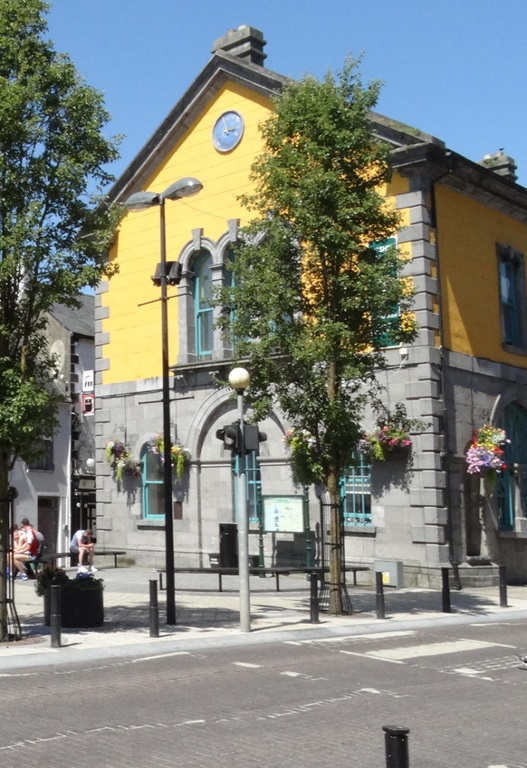
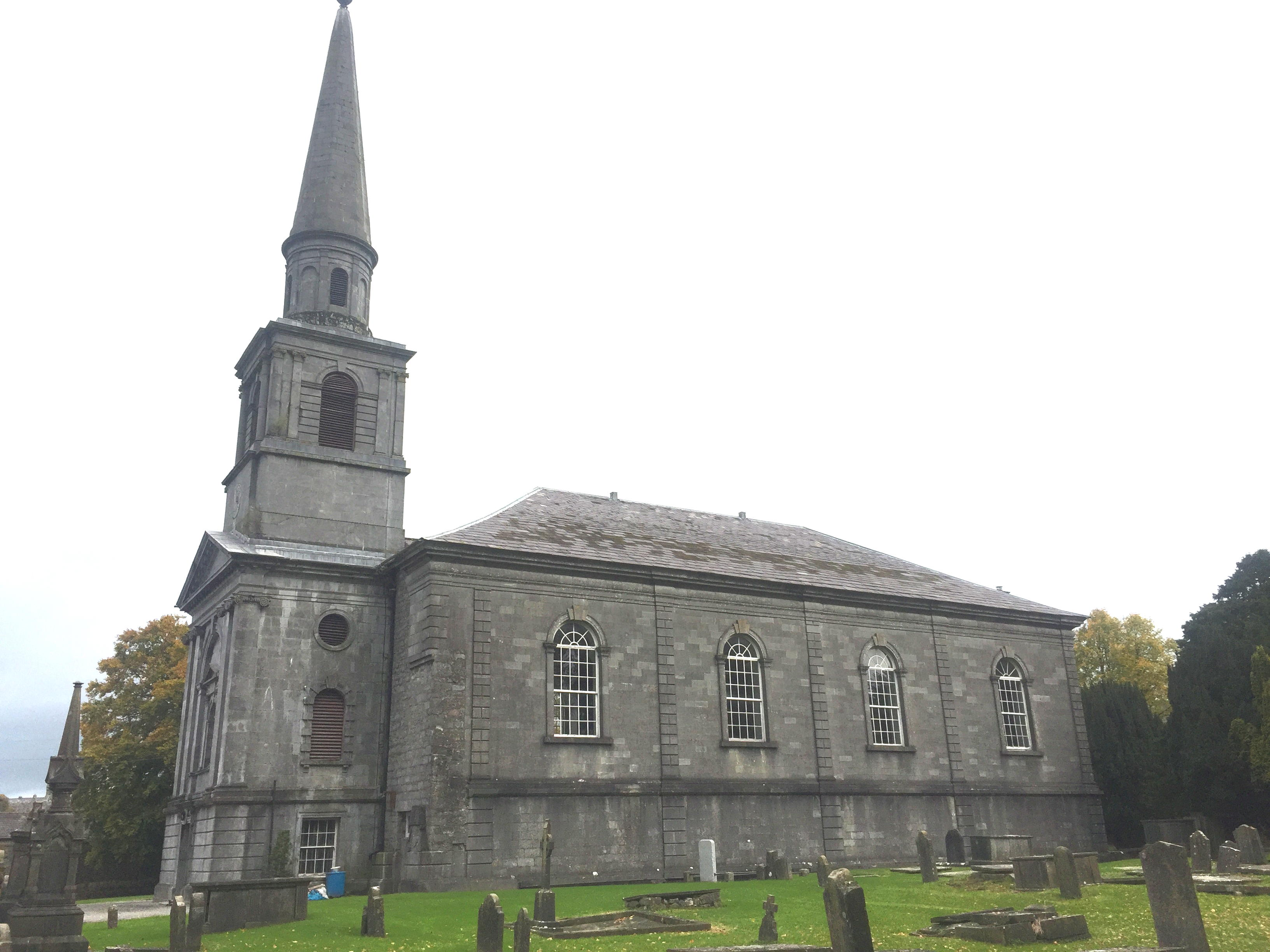
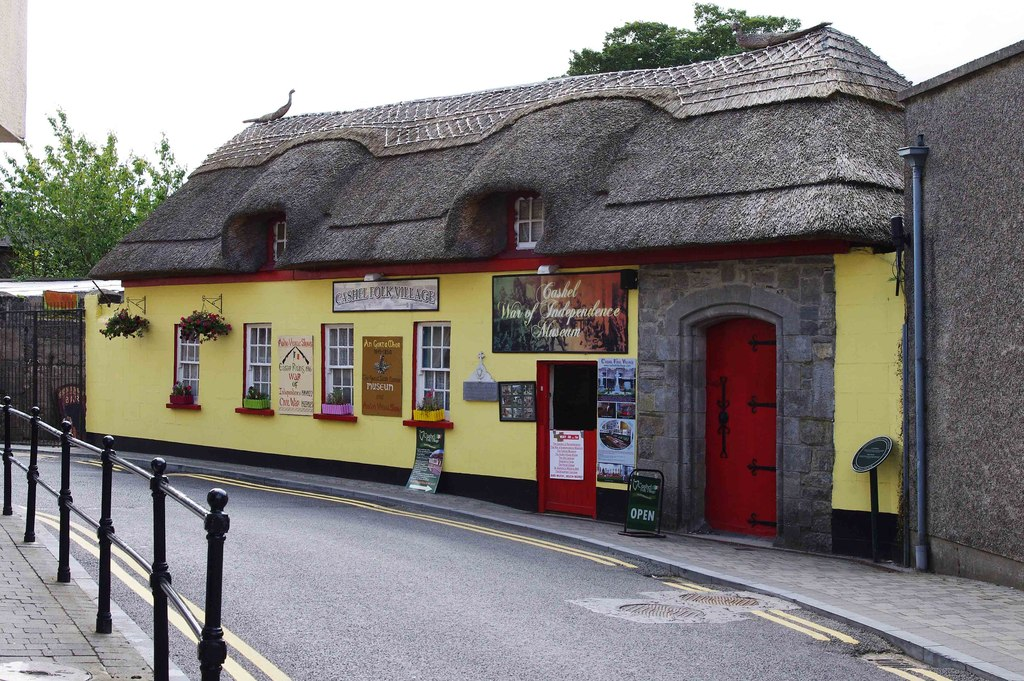
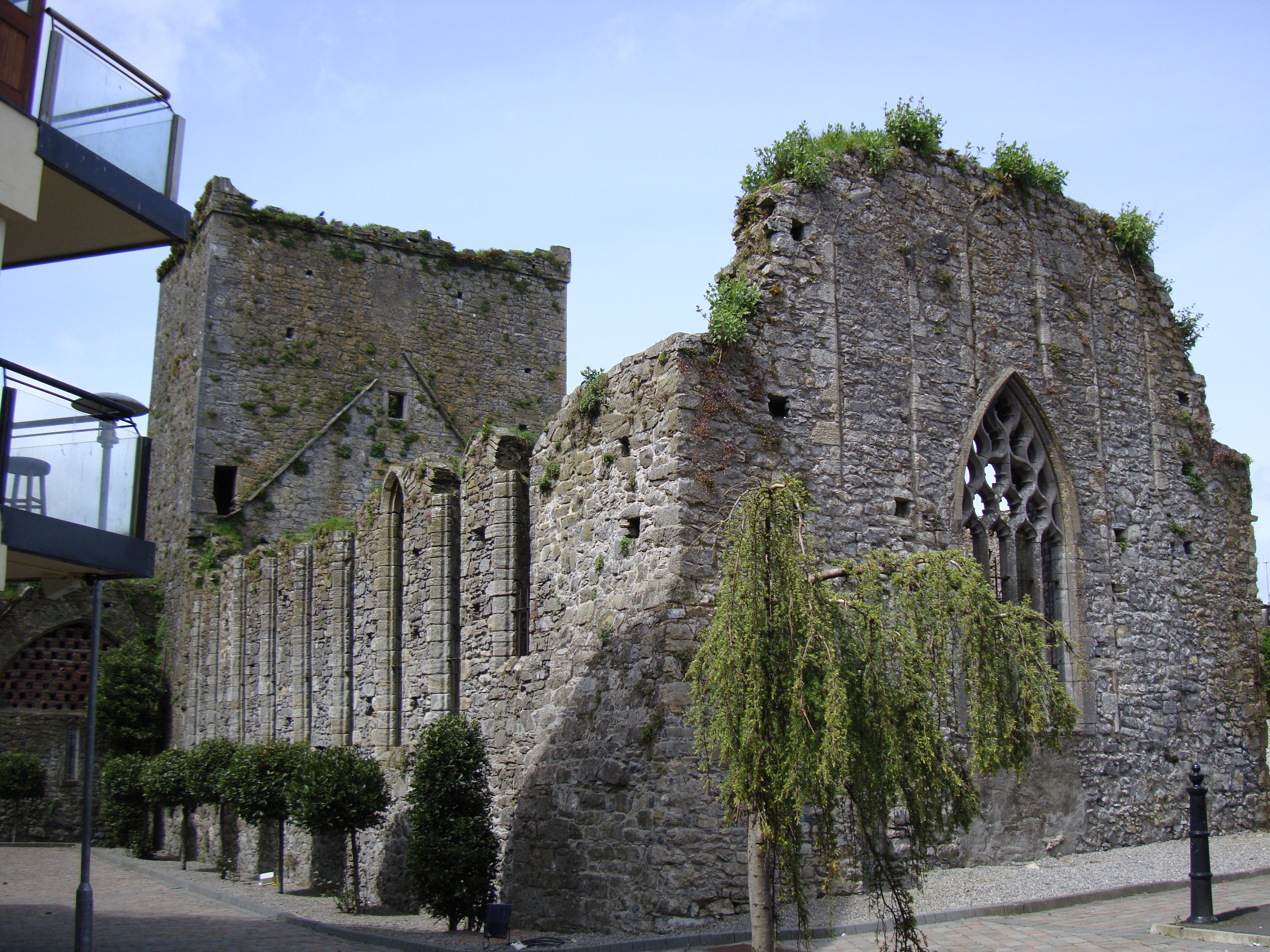
- Rock of Cashel Cashel Town Hall Cashel Cathedral Cashel Folk Village St Dominic's Abbey

- Location in Ireland
- Coordinates: 52.516717°N 7.889428°W
- Country: Ireland
- Province: Munster
- County: County Tipperary
- Barony: Middle Third
- Elevation: 125 m (410 ft)

Population (2022)
  - Total: 4,805
- Time zone: UTC0 (WET)
  - Summer (DST): UTC+1 (IST)
- Eircode: E25
- Area code: 062
- S075408: Irish Grid Reference
- Website: www.cashel.ie

Historical population
Year	Pop.	±%
1821	5,974	—
1831	6,971	+16.7%
1841	7,036	+0.9%
1851	4,650	−33.9%
1861	4,327	−6.9%
1871	4,562	+5.4%
1881	3,961	−13.2%
1891	3,216	−18.8%
1901	2,938	−8.6%
1911	2,813	−4.3%
1926	2,953	+5.0%
1936	3,028	+2.5%
1946	3,063	+1.2%
1951	2,829	−7.6%
1956	2,817	−0.4%
1961	2,679	−4.9%
1966	2,682	+0.1%
1971	2,692	+0.4%
1981	2,754	+2.3%
1986	2,829	+2.7%
1991	2,814	−0.5%
1996	2,957	+5.1%
2002	2,770	−6.3%
2006	2,936	+6.0%
2011	4,051	+38.0%
2016	4,422	+9.2%
2022	4,805	+8.7%

Cashel (/ˈkæʃəl/; Irish: Caiseal, meaning 'stone ringfort') is a historic medieval market town in County Tipperary in Ireland. Its population was 4,805 in the 2022 census. The town gives its name to the ecclesiastical province of Cashel. Additionally, the cathedra of the Roman Catholic Archdiocese of Cashel and Emly was originally in the town prior to the English Reformation. It is part of the parish of Cashel and Rosegreen in the same archdiocese. One of the six cathedrals of the Anglican Bishop of Cashel and Ossory, who currently resides in Kilkenny, is located in the town. It is in the civil parish of St. Patrick's Rock which is in the historical barony of Middle Third.

== Location and access ==
The town is situated in the Golden Vale, an area of rolling pastureland in the province of Munster.

=== Roads ===
It is located off the M8 Dublin to Cork motorway. Prior to the construction of the motorway by-pass (in 2004), the town was noted as a bottleneck on the N8 Dublin to Cork route.

=== Bus services ===
Bus Éireann operates a service (route 245X) between Dublin and Cork which calls at Cashel. Bus Éireann route 128X provides a link to Portlaoise via Urlingford. The Shamrock Bus Company operates a Thurles to Clonmel route via Cashel.

=== Rail services ===
Cashel used to be served by a railway, the Cashel spur line, which is now closed. The nearest railway station is Cahir, 17 kilometers away. This station is on an infrequently serviced line, but is useful if travelling east to/from Waterford. The most convenient and frequently serviced rail station for Cashel is Thurles as this is on the Dublin-Cork InterCity rail line.

== History ==
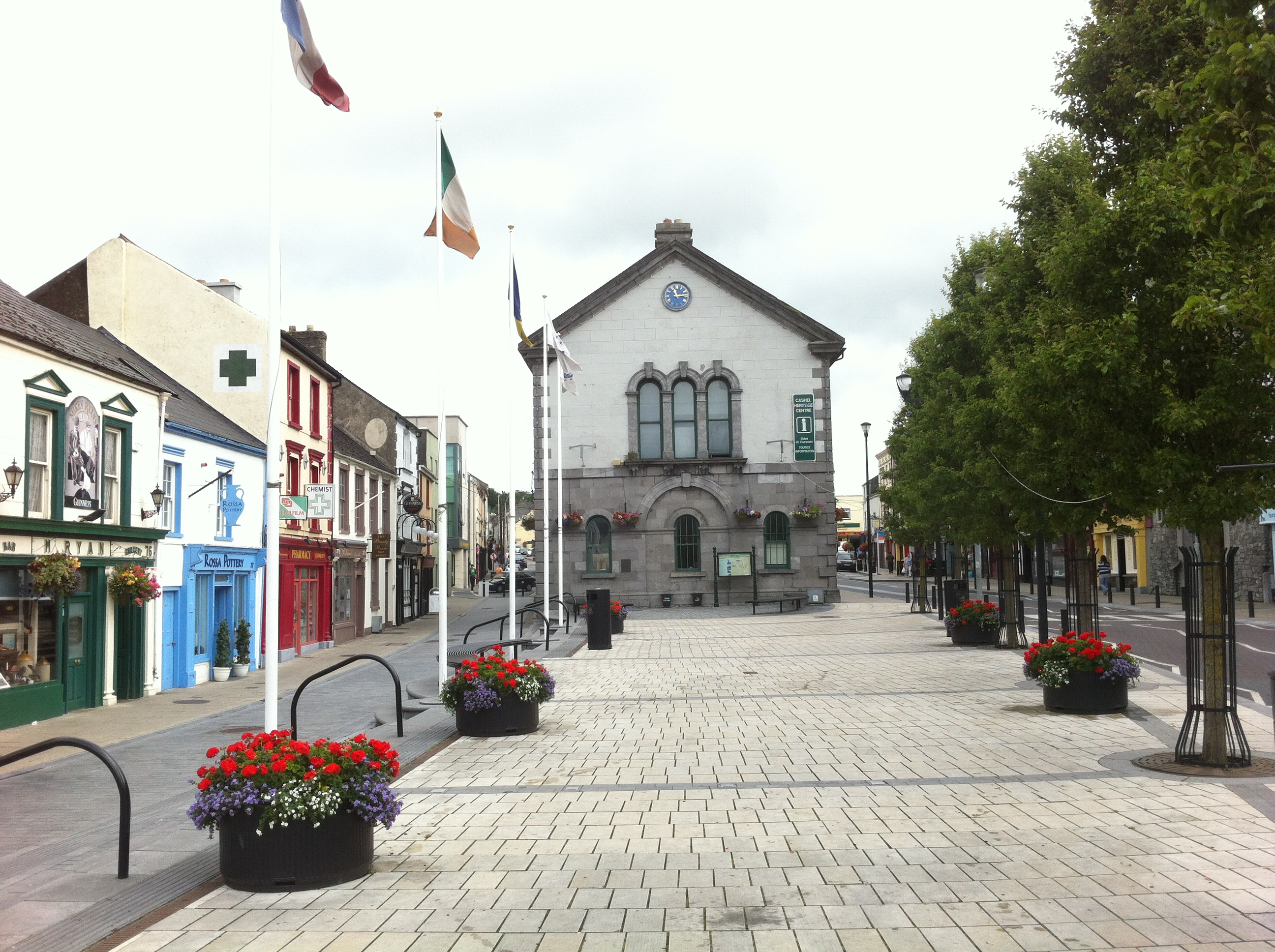
Cashel Town Hall

=== Ancient history ===
The Rock of Cashel, to which the town below owes its origin, is an isolated elevation of stratified limestone, rising abruptly from a broad and fertile plain called the Golden Vale. The top of this eminence is crowned by a group of remarkable ruins. Originally known as Fairy Hill, or Sid-Druim, the Rock was, in pagan times, the dun, or castle, of the ancient Eoghnacht Chiefs of Munster. In Gaelic, Caiseal denotes a circular stone fort and is the name of several places in Ireland. The "Book of Rights" suggests the name is derived from Cais-il, i.e. "tribute stone", because the Munster tribes paid tribute on the Rock. Here Corc, grandfather of Aengus Mac Natfraich, erected a fort. Cashel subsequently became the capital of Munster and, like Tara and Armagh, it was a celebrated court. At the time of St. Patrick, when Aengus ruled as king, Cashel claimed supremacy over all the royal duns of the province.

In the 5th century, the Eóganachta dynasty founded their capital on and around the rock. Many kings of Munster have reigned here since. Saint Patrick is believed to have baptised Cashel's third king, Aengus. In 977 the Dál gCais usurper, Brian Boru, was crowned here as the first non-Eóghanacht king of Cashel and Munster in over five hundred years. In 1101 his great-grandson, King Muirchertach Ua Briain, gave the place to the bishop of Limerick, thus denying it forever to the MacCarthys, the senior branch of the Eóganachta. The bishops had a famous school in Cashel and sent priests all over the continent, especially to Regensburg in Germany, where they maintained their own monastery, called Scots Monastery.

=== Lordship of Ireland ===
The Synod of Cashel of 1172 was organised by Henry II of England. The Synod sought to regulate some affairs of the Church in Ireland and to condemn some abuses, bringing the Church more into alignment with the Roman Rite. It has been suggested that the seventh act of the Synod called upon the clergy and people of Ireland to acknowledge Henry II as their king. However, a careful reading of the seventh act would not support this interpretation. Nevertheless, there is little doubt that the Henry II's purpose in requiring the convocation was to overawe the Irish clergy with a display of his power; no doubt he succeeded in this. In this scenario, the convocation would be viewed as a pretext for the show of strength.

On 30 December 1640, Cashel was captured by an Irish force under Pilib Ó Dubhuir (died 1648) of Dundrum and his brother Donnchadh Ó Dubhuir (hanged in 1652). They took prisoner 300 members of the English garrison and inhabitants. The following day, 15 prisoners were killed as revenge for earlier atrocities against the Irish; however, this was against Ó Dubhuir's orders. In 1647, during the Irish Confederate Wars, the town was stormed and sacked by English Parliamentarian troops under the 6th Baron Inchiquin (later created the 1st Earl of Inchiquin). Over 1,000 Irish Catholic soldiers and civilians, including several prominent clerics, were killed in the attack and ensuing massacre.

=== Ecclesiastical history ===
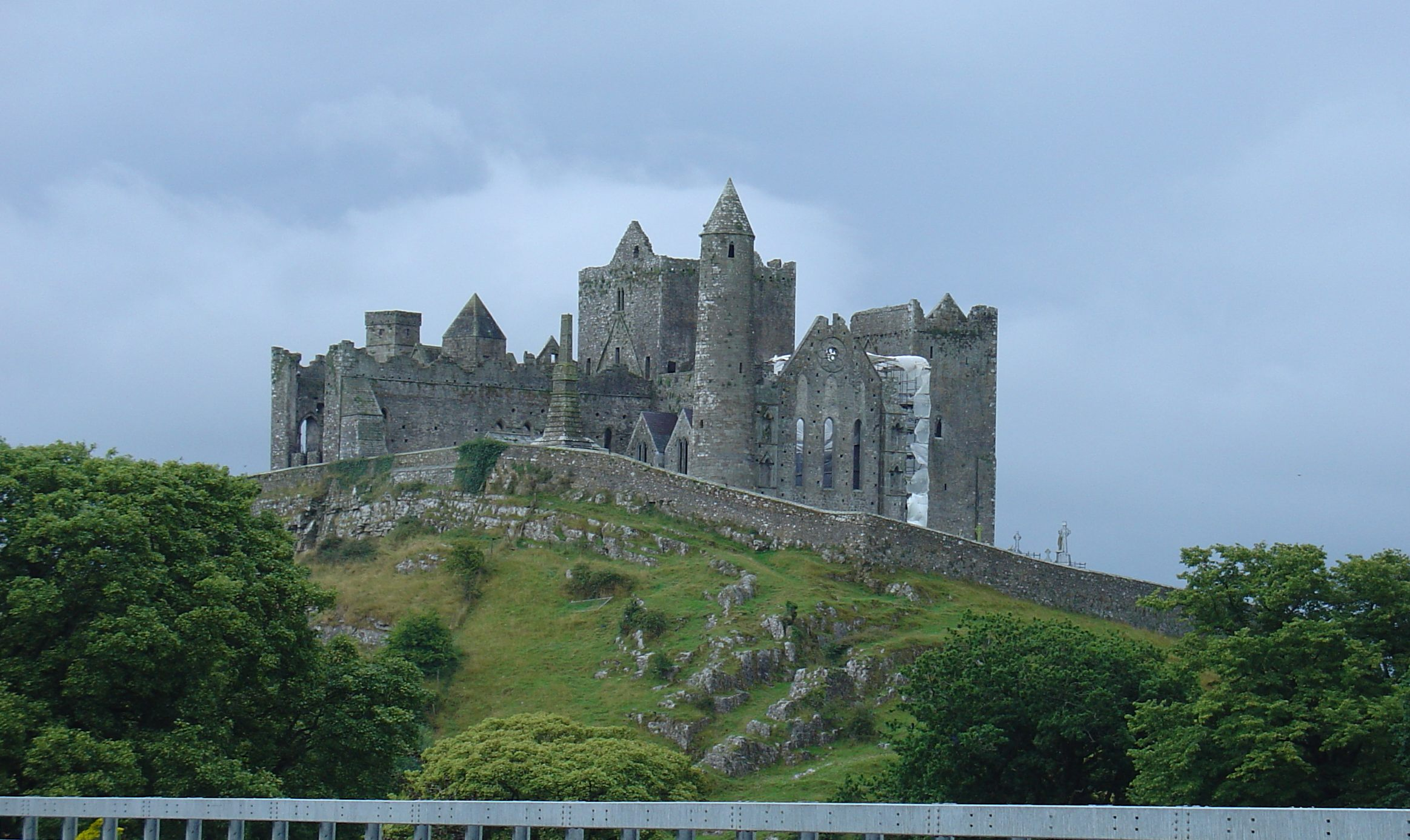
Rock of Cashel

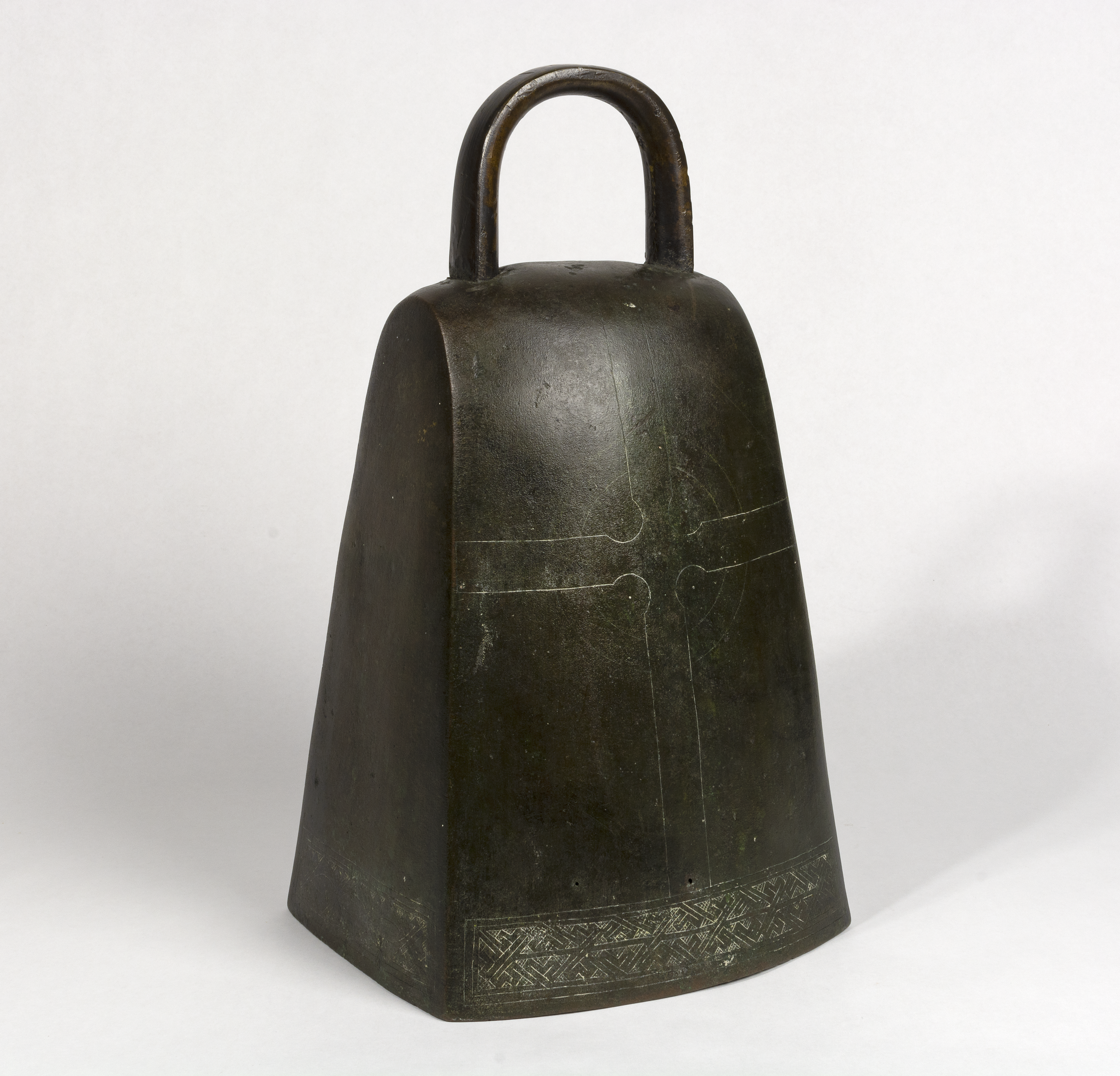
This 9th century bell was found near Cashel in 1849. Now on display at the Hunt Museum.

About 450, Saint Patrick preached at the royal dun and converted king Aengus. The Tripartite Life of the saint relates that while "he was baptising Aengus the spike of the crozier went through the foot of the King" who bore with the painful wound in the belief "that it was a rite of the Faith". According to the same authority, twenty-seven kings of the race of Aengus and his brother Aillil ruled in Cashel until 897, when Cerm-gecan was slain in battle. There is no evidence that St Patrick founded a church at Cashel, or appointed a Bishop of Cashel. St Ailbe, it is supposed, had already fixed his see at Emly, not far off, and within the king's dominions. Cashel continued to be the chief residence of the Kings of Munster until 1100, hence its title, "City of the Kings". Before that date, there was no mention in the native annals of any Bishop, or Archbishop of Cashel. Cormac MacCullinan is referred to, but not correctly, as Archbishop of Cashel, by later writers. He was a bishop, but not of Cashel, where he was king. The most famous man in Ireland of his time, but more of a scholar and warrior than an ecclesiastic, Cormac has left us a glossary of Irish names, which displays his knowledge of Latin, Greek, and Hebrew, and the "Psalter of Cashel", a work treating of the history and antiquities of Ireland. He was slain in 903, in a great battle near Carlow.

Brian Boru (Brian Bóruma) fortified Cashel in 990. Murtagh O'Brien, King of Cashel, in presence of the chiefs and clergy, made a grant in 1101 of the "Rock" with the territory around it to O'Dunan, "noble bishop and chief senior of Munster", and dedicated it to God and St. Patrick. Then Cashel became an archiepiscopal see, and O'Dunan its first prelate as far as the primate, St. Celsus, could appoint him. At the synod of Kells, 1152, Cardinal Paparo gave a pallium to Donat O'Lonergan of Cashel, and since then his successors have ruled the ecclesiastical province of Munster. In 1127 Cormac Mac Cárthaigh, King of Desmond, erected close to his palace on the "Rock" a church, now known as Cormac's Chapel, which was consecrated in 1134, when a synod was held within its walls. During the episcopate of Donal O'Hullican (1158–1182), the King of Limerick, Domnall O'Brien, built in 1169 a more spacious church beside Cormac's Chapel, which then became a chapterhouse. St. Dominic's Abbey, a Dominican monastery, was established in 1243.

Maurice, a Geraldine, filled the see from 1504 to 1523, and was succeeded by Edmund Butler, prior of Athassal Abbey, who was a natural son of Pierce, Earl of Ormond. In addition to the wars between the Irish and the English there arose a new element of discord, the Anglican Reformation introduced by Henry VIII. While residing at Kilmeaden Castle Archbishop Butler levied black-mail on the traders of the Suir, robbing their boats and holding their persons for ransom. At a session of the royal privy council held at Clonmel in 1539, he swore to uphold the spiritual supremacy of the king and denied the power in Ireland of the Bishop of Rome. He died 1550 and was buried in the cathedral.

=== Post-Reformation ===
Roland, a Geraldine (1553–1561), was created Archbishop of Cashel at the recommendation of Mary I. After a vacancy of six years, Maurice MacGibbon (1567–1578), a Cistercian abbot, was promoted to the archbishopric by Pope Pius V, but James MacCawell was put forward by Elizabeth I. Thus began the Anglican religion at Cashel. FitzGibbon, who belonged to the royal Desmond family, being deprived of his see, fled to France and passed into Spain where he resided for a time at the Court. He conferred with the English ambassador at Paris to obtain pardon for leaving the country without the Queen's sanction, and to get permission to return. In this he failed, and going back to Ireland secretly he was arrested and imprisoned at Cork, where he died in 1578. On the death of MacCaghwell, Elizabeth advanced Miler MacGrath, a Franciscan and Bishop of Down, to the See of Cashel. He held at the same time four bishoprics and several benefices, out of which he provided for his numerous offspring. Having occupied the see for fifty-two years, he died in 1622. His monument in the ruined cathedral bears an epitaph written by himself.

Dermot O'Hurley, or Diarmaid Ó hUrthuile, of Limerick, a distinguished student of the university of Louvain in the Duchy of Brabant and professor at Reims in France, was appointed Archbishop of Cashel in 1581 by Pope Gregory XIII. Having presided over the Catholic diocese secretly for two years, he was discovered and brought before the Lord Justices at Dublin, was tortured upon his refusal to take the Oath of Supremacy to the English crown and was subsequently hanged outside the city on 20 June 1584.

Following his killing by a relative c. 1724, the severed head of Rapparee and local folk hero Éamonn an Chnoic was displayed spiked upon Cashel Gaol until some local men removed it and gave the head to O'Ryan's sister, who arranged for a Catholic burial.

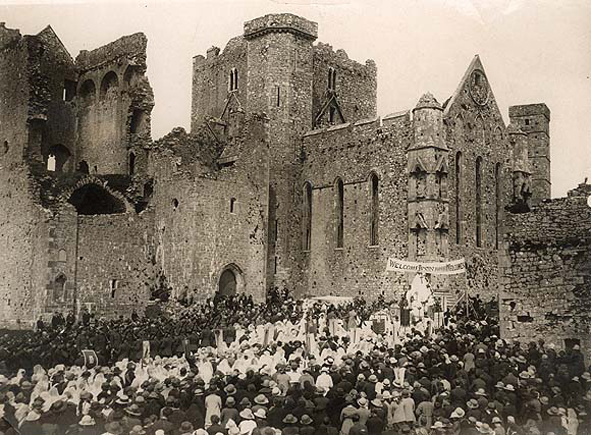
Celebration of Corpus Christi at Rock of Cashel c. 1922

Dr Butler 2nd (1774–1791), on being appointed to the Roman Catholic diocese, settled in Thurles, where the Roman Catholic archbishops since then have resided. His successor, Archbishop Bray (1792–1820), built a large church in the early part of the 19th century, on the site of which Archbishop Patrick Leahy (1857–1874) erected a splendid cathedral in Romanesque style. It was completed and consecrated in 1879 by Archbishop Croke (1874–1902) and dedicated to Our Lady of the Assumption.

Albert of Cashel (feast 8 January), a reputed former bishop, is the patron saint of the Roman Catholic diocese. The Archbishop of Cashel is Administrator of the ancient Diocese of Emly.

The Anglican archbishopric was reduced in status by legislation of 1833 and the bishopric combined initially with Waterford. Today the Church of Ireland, Cashel Union of Parishes is part of The Diocese of Cashel, Ferns and Ossory

=== Corporation of the city ===
The corporation of the city of Cashel existed, as the local government of its area, until it was abolished by the Municipal Corporations (Ireland) Act 1840. The parliamentary borough was not affected by this change in administrative arrangements.

Samuel Lewis, in A Topographical Directory of Ireland (1837), described the oligarchic constitution of the city:

The corporation, under the style of the "Mayor, Aldermen, Bailiffs, Citizens, and Commons of the City of Cashel," consists of a mayor, aldermen (limited by the charter to 17 in number), two bailiffs, and an unlimited number of commons, aided by a recorder, town-clerk, two serjeants-at-mace, a sword-bearer, and a crier; a treasurer is also appointed. The mayor is elected annually on 29 June, by the court of common hall, and is one of three persons nominated by the aldermen from among themselves, but the choice may be extended to the citizens and commons, at the discretion of the aldermen; he is sworn into office on 29 Sept., and, with the concurrence of three aldermen, has power to appoint a deputy during illness or absence. The aldermen, on vacancies occurring, are chosen from among the freemen by the remaining aldermen, and hold office for life. The recorder, according to practice, is elected by the mayor and aldermen, but the charter gives the power to the entire body; he holds his office during good behaviour, and may appoint a deputy. The bailiffs, by the charter, are eligible from among the citizens, one by the mayor and aldermen and one by the corporation at large; according to practice they are elected annually on 29 June in the common hall from among the freemen, on the recommendation of the aldermen. The town-clerk is elected annually with the mayor and bailiffs; the sword-bearer is eligible by the whole body, and holds his office during good behaviour; and the serjeant-at-mace and the crier are appointed by the mayor. The freedom is obtained only by gift of the mayor and aldermen, who are the ruling body of the corporation, and have the entire management of its affairs. The city returned two members to the Irish parliament until the Union, since which it has sent one to the Imperial parliament. The right of election was vested solely in the corporation, but by the act of the 2nd of Wm. IV., cap. 88, has been extended to the £10 householders of an enlarged district, comprising an area of 3,974 acres [16.08 km^{2}], which has been constituted the new electoral borough, and the limits of which are minutely described in the Appendix: the number of electors registered at the close of 1835 was 277, of whom 8 were freemen; the mayor is the returning officer.

== Administration ==
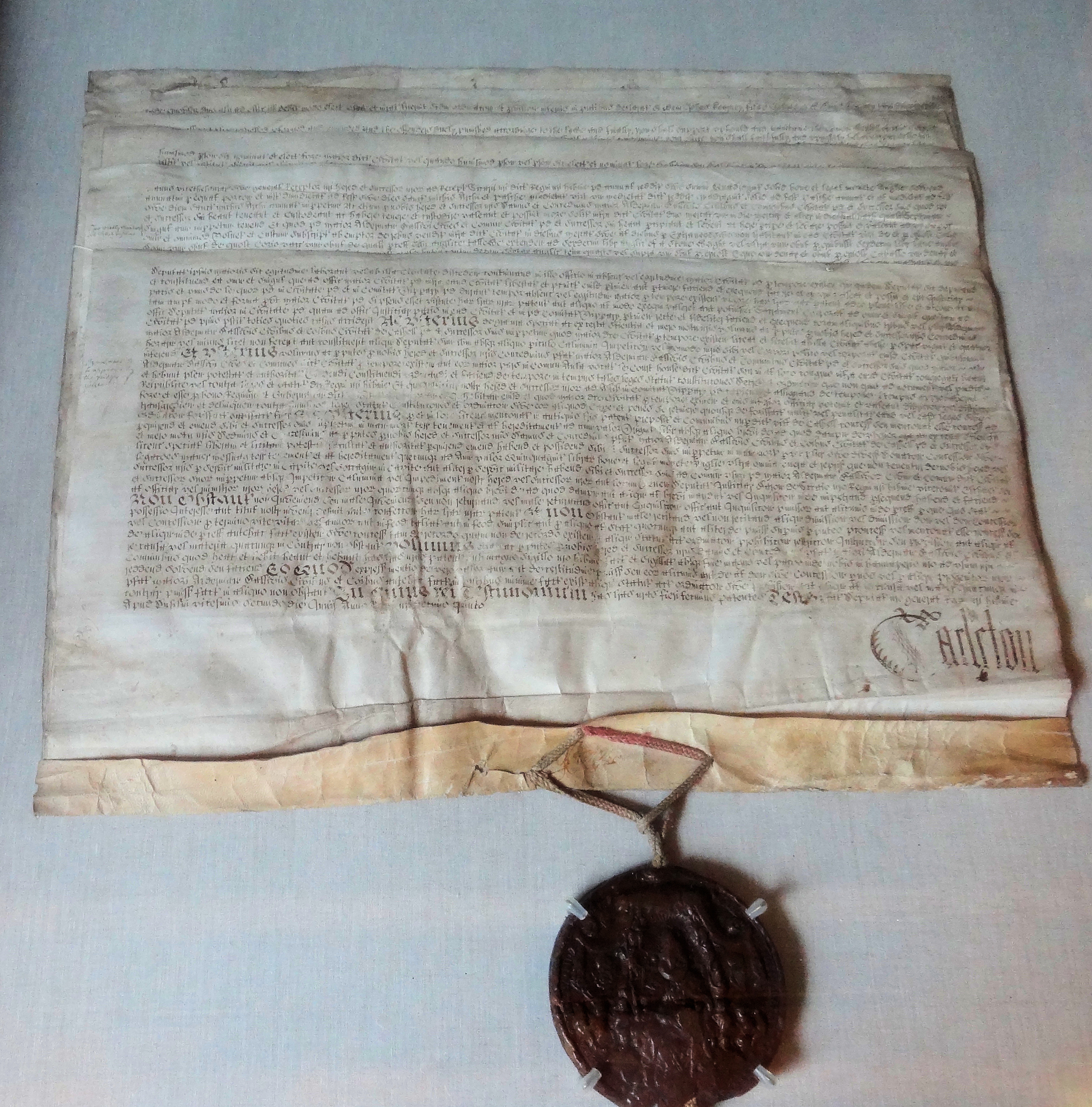
Charters on display in the Heritage Centre.

The town of Cashel was granted a royal charter by Elizabeth I in 1585 and was given city status in 1638. It was represented in the Irish House of Commons by a two-seat borough constituency until 1801, continuing to be represented by a single-member constituency in the UK House of Commons. Robert Peel, later Prime Minister, began his parliamentary career as MP for Cashel. The borough corporation was abolished under the Municipal Corporations (Ireland) Act 1840. In 1845, Cashel applied for restoration of its charter, but this was not granted (as it was in the case of Wexford). The parliamentary borough retained representation until it was abolished under the Redistribution of Seats Act 1885.

From 1899, on the coming into operation of the Local Government (Ireland) Act 1898, it became an urban district within South Tipperary. The urban district council became a town council in 2002 under the Local Government Reform Act 2014. All town councils in Ireland were abolished in 2014.

With the town of Tipperary, it forms the seven-seat local electoral area (LEA) of Cashel–Tipperary for elections to Tipperary County Council. This LEA is combined with Cahir to form the municipal district of Tipperary–Cahir–Cashel.

== Tourism ==
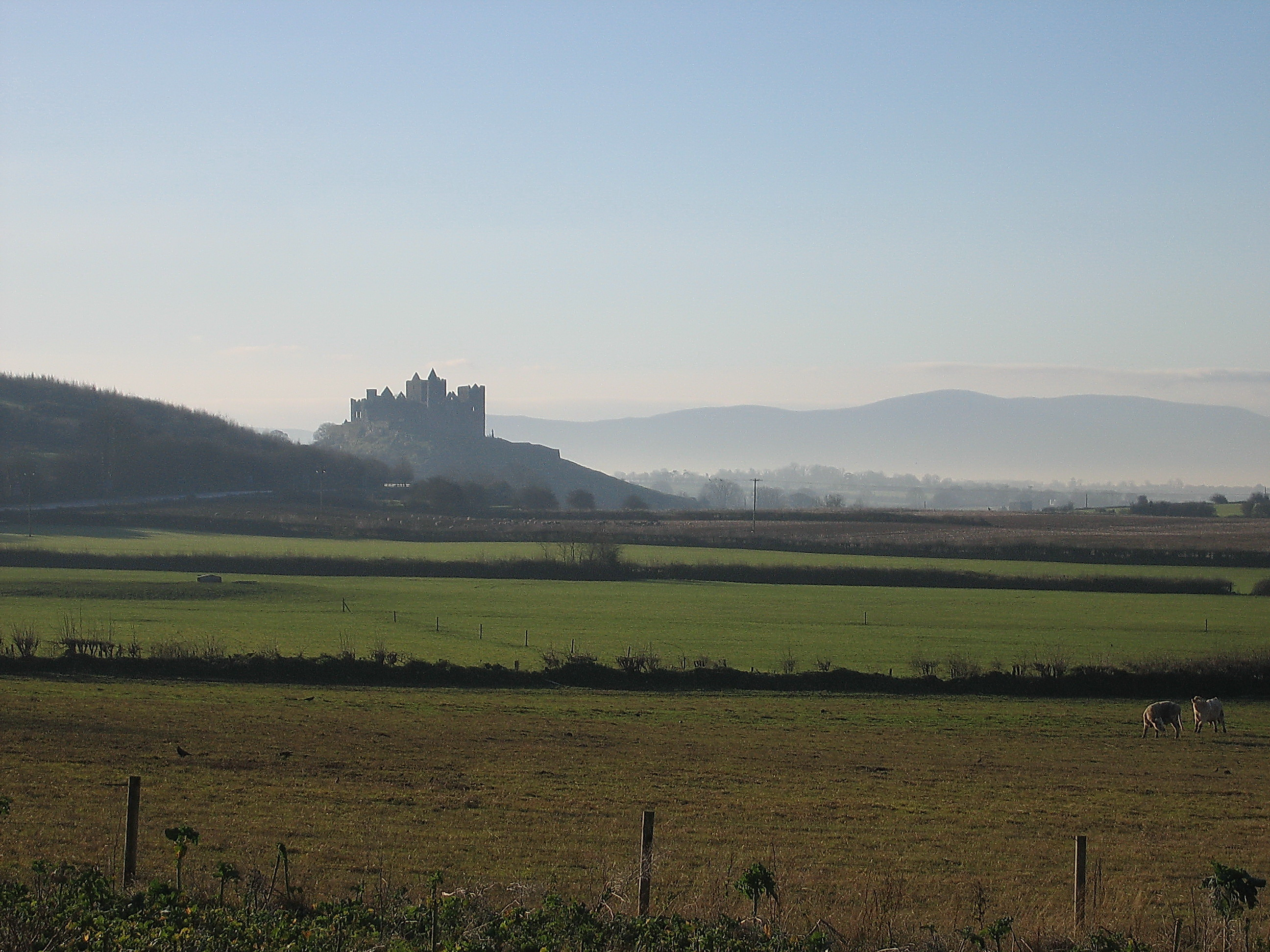
The Rock of Cashel

The Rock of Cashel is now one of Ireland's most popular tourist sites. The town has several other attractions, including the Bolton Library.

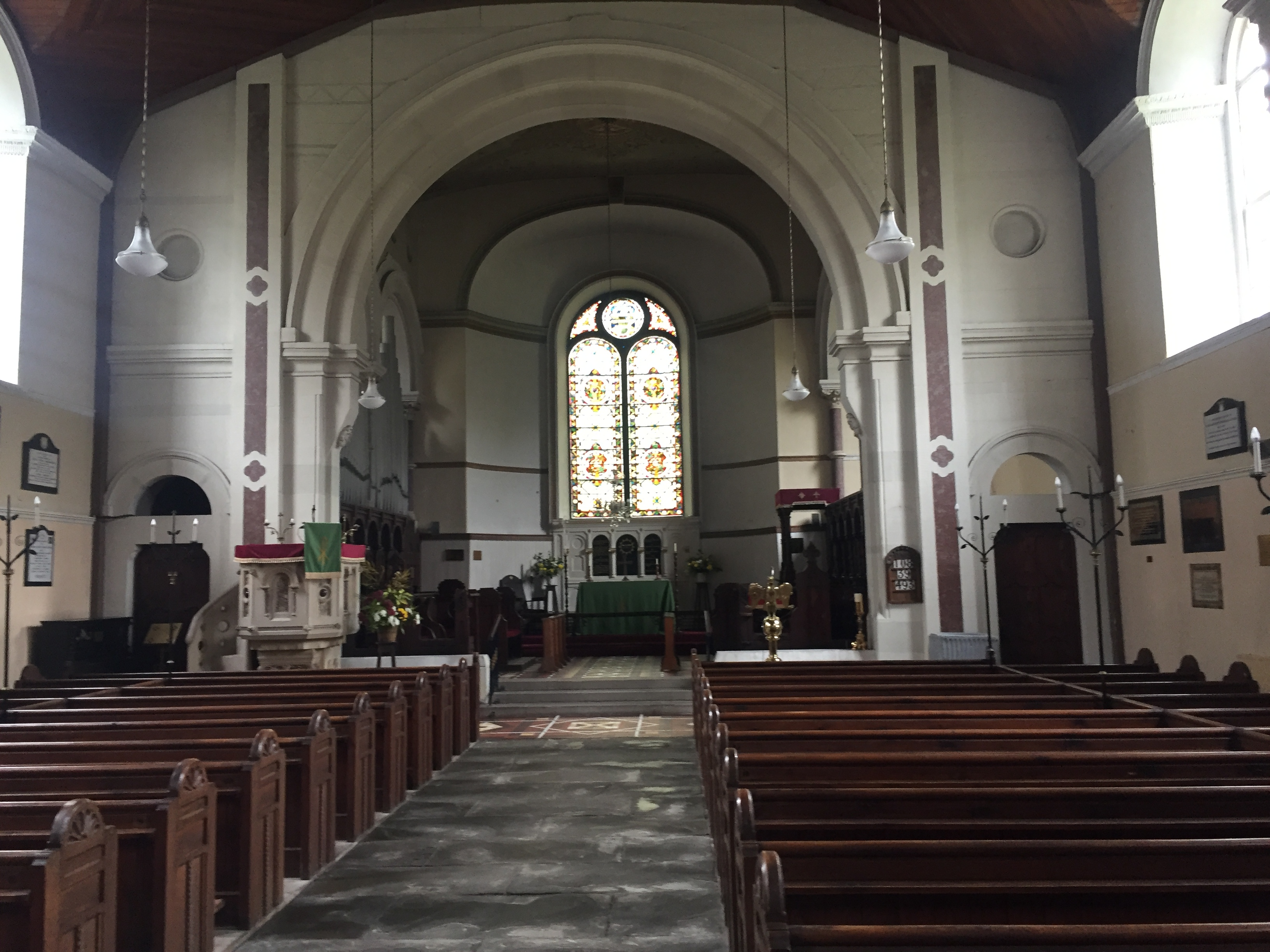
Interior of the Cathedral Church of St John the Baptist and St Patricks Rock

Cashel Town Hall, which accommodates the Heritage Centre and Tourist Office, on Main Street displays a model of Cashel in the 1640s and a multimedia presentation in several languages, and sells Tipperary crafts. The charters granted by Charles II (1663) and James II (1687) are on display in the Heritage Centre.

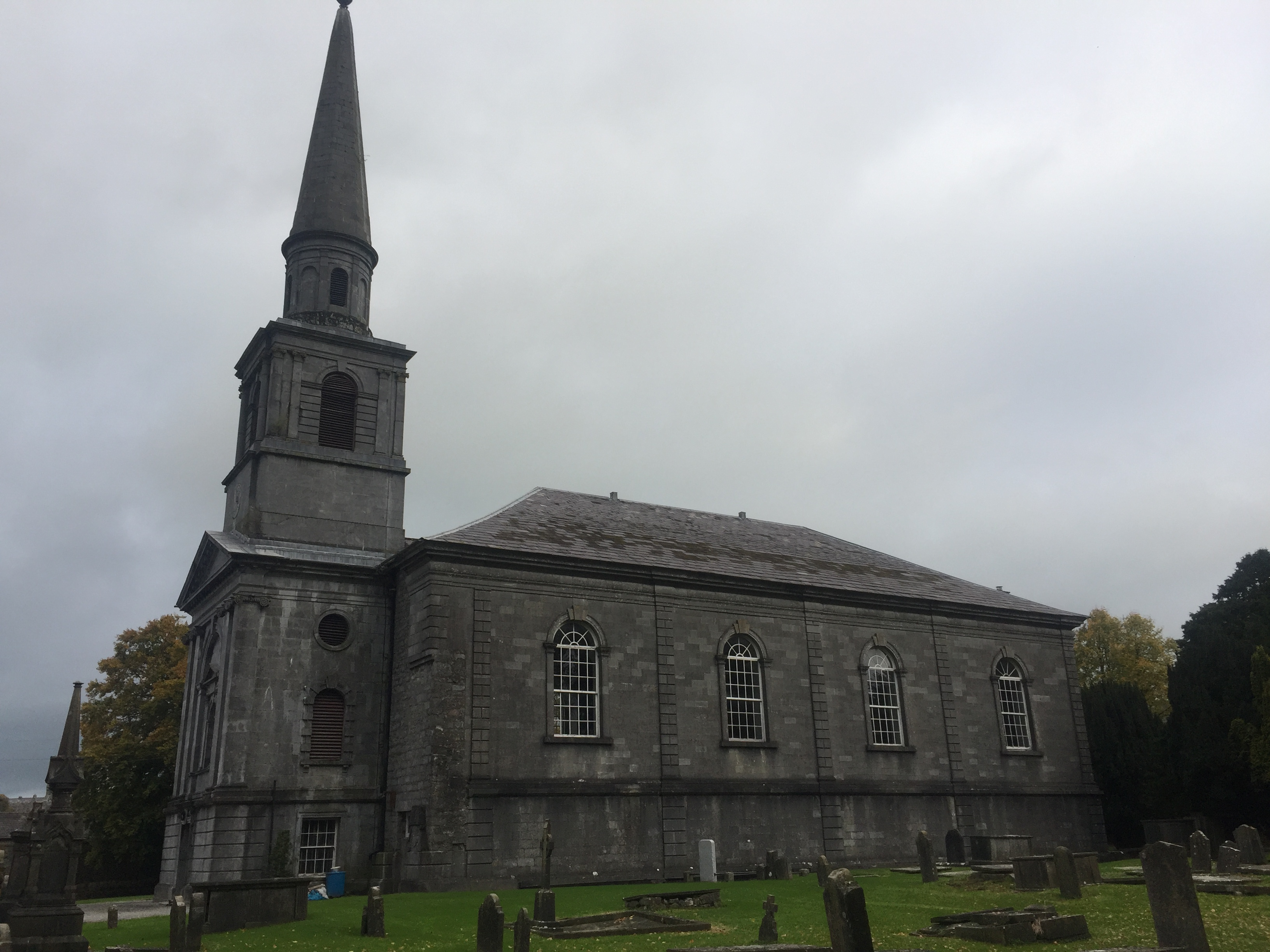
The Georgian built Cathedral Church of St John the Baptist and St Patrick's Rock on John Street, Cashel

The Georgian Cathedral Church of St John the Baptist and St Patrick's Rock on John Street (which replaced that on the Rock in the 18th century) and its adjacent Chapter House (which housed the Bolton Library from the 1980s till the 2000s), city walls, and the former Deanery. The former Church of Ireland Archbishop's palace re-opened as a hotel in 2022.

St. Dominic's Abbey's ruins are visible southeast of the Rock.

The Cashel Folk Village includes replica displays of country life in early Ireland, including an old public house, a butcher's shop, a farmhouse, a Traveller's caravan, and a chapel. It also includes republican monuments commemorating Tipperary's role in the Anglo-Irish War and Irish Civil War.

A street in Christchurch, New Zealand, is named after the bishopric.

== Sport ==
Cashel King Cormacs GAA is the local Gaelic Athletic Association club.

Other local sports teams include Cashel Town Football Club (a local association football club) and Cashel RFC (the local rugby union club).

== Education ==
Cashel is home to the following schools and education institutions:

=== Pre-school ===
- Cashel Pre-School Playgroup
- Longfield Academy Cashel

=== Primary schools ===
- Ballytarsna National School (public school)
- St John The Baptist Boys National School (non-mixed catholic private school)
- St John The Baptist Girls Primary School (non-mixed catholic private school)
- The Deanery School (mixed protestant private school)

=== Secondary schools ===
- Cashel Community School (public school)
- Rockwell College (mixed private school)

=== Specialised schools ===
- Scoil Chormaic Special Needs School, also known as Cormaic Special School (special needs pre-school, primary school and post primary)
- Scoil Aonghusa (special needs co-educational school)
- Tipperary ETB Adult and Further Education Centre (general further education courses for all)

== People ==
- Lumsden Hare, actor (1874–1964)
- John M. Feehan (1916–1991), author and publisher, was born here
- Kevin Thornton (born c. 1958), celebrity chef
- Denis Leamy (born 1981), rugby player for Ireland and Munster
- Denis Fogarty (born 1983), rugby player for Ireland and Munster

== See also ==
- List of monastic houses in Ireland (County Tipperary)
- List of towns and villages in the Republic of Ireland
- List of market houses in the Republic of Ireland
