= Alfred Edwin Jones =

Irish architect (1894–1973)

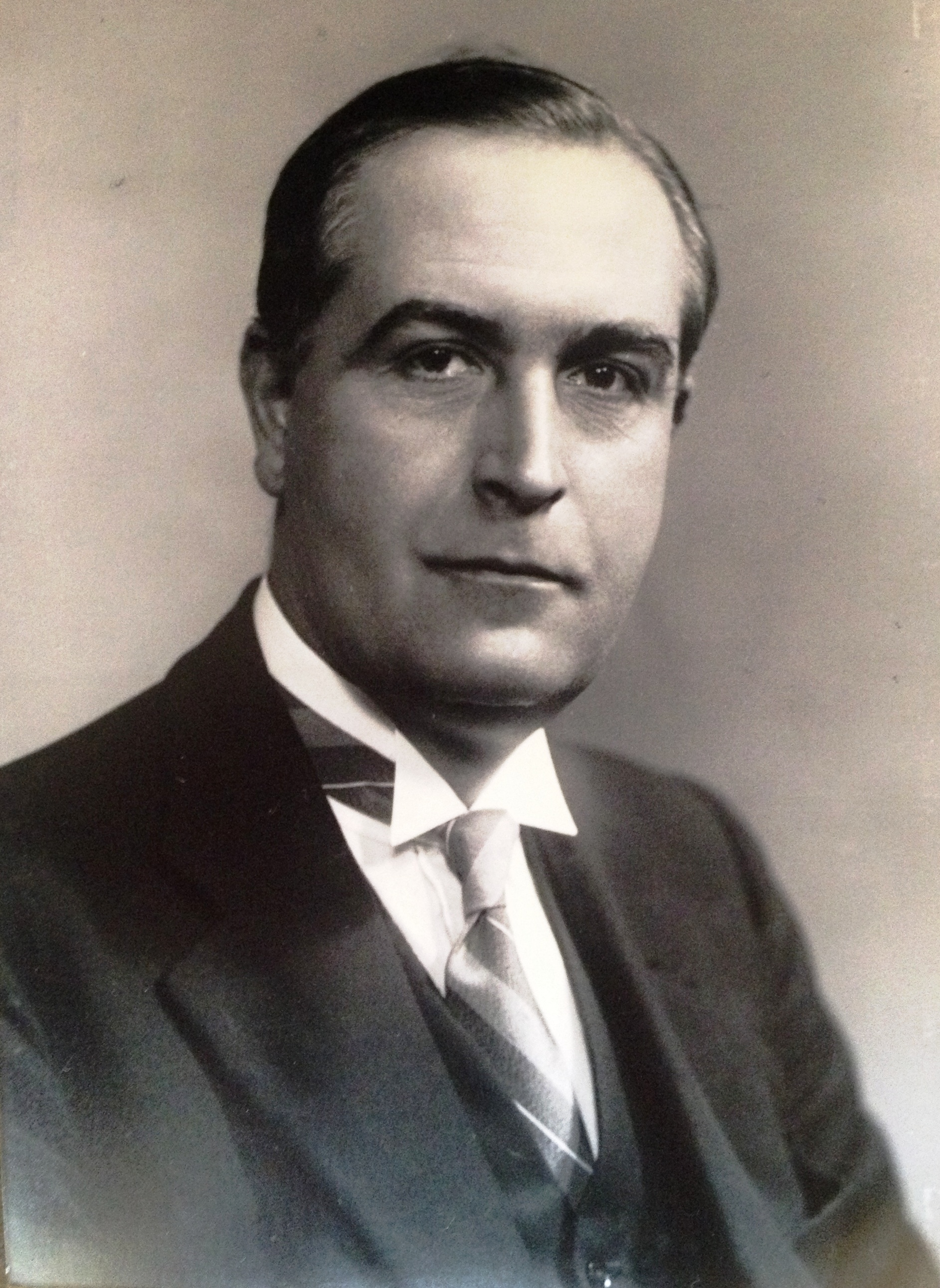
- Born: 14 August 1894; Shorncliffe, Kent, England
- Died: 29 June 1973 (aged 78)
- Education: Belvedere College
- Occupation: Architect

Alfred Edwin Jones (1894–1973) was an Irish architect. His collection of files about Irish architects formed the basis of the Dictionary of Irish Architects 1720–1940.

== Childhood and youth ==
Alfred Edwin Jones, only son of Felix Thomas Jones and Mary Mitchell, was born in Shorncliff, Kent, England, on 14 August 1894. He spent his early childhood in Rawalpindi where his father was a sergeant major in the 4th Royal Irish Dragoon Guards. On his father's retirement from the service in 1895 the family moved to Dublin, Ireland. Educated by the Jesuits at Belvedere College, Alfred pursued a variety of careers before becoming apprenticed to the architectural practice of Ashlin & Coleman c. 1911. He first attracted notice about this time when his measured drawing of the ceiling of Belvedere's Apollo Room was featured in the Irish Builder. A design for an iron railing and gate which won him the gold medal at the Father Matthew Feis, two years later, was published in the same journal. Earlier illustrations by Jones had appeared in the third, fourth and fifth volumes of the Irish Georgian Society Records (1911–1913). By 1914 he was an assistant in the practice of Rudolf Maximilian Butler with a growing reputation. In 1918 his drawings of the Marino Casino won him the Downes Bronze Medal of the Architectural Association of Ireland, according to the judges, ' one of the finest specimens of draughtsmanship ever produced by a member of the Association'.

== Professional career ==
=== Early years ===
In 1919, Jones spent some months in partnership with Aubrey Vincent O’Rourke. Later that year he set up practice with Stephen Stanislaus Kelly whom he had known since childhood. In 1920, they won the competition for Ballymena Town Hall, and in 1923 were winners of the Cork City Hall design competition. They remained in practice, under the title 'Jones & Kelly' until Kelly's death in 1951. Subsequently, Jones took his son Felix Alfred Jones and his elder daughter, Elisabeth Fleming, into partnership, providing consultancy services to the firm for the remaining years of his life.

The practice was then taken over by his grandson, also named Alfred E. Jones, who carried on the practice until 2022. He was a fine designer and winner of The RIAI Travelling scholarship while a student. He was a designer of many residential developments on the South side of Dublin, and as a conservation architect was much in demand. Some of his residential projects included 'The Burgage' in Dalkey, 'Rock Lodge' in Limerick, Stratford College in Rathgar, The Mill Hill Missionaries Retirement Center also in Rathgar, along with numerous other residential projects.

=== Mature years ===
Alfred Jones & Stephen Kelly had a wide-ranging practice, involving the design of ecclesiastical and educational structures as well as cinemas, theatres, manufacturing plants, commercial buildings and housing schemes. Among their most notable achievements were: Screen Cinema, Eden Quay, Dublin (1920, 1930; Ballymena Town Hall, County Antrim (1928); Church of the Four Masters, Friary, Athlone, County Westmeath (1930); Mount Mellerary Cistercian Abbey, County Waterford (1924–27, 1933); DeLuxe Cinema, Camden Street, Dublin (1933); The Green Cinema, St. Stephen's Green, Dublin (1935); Columban missionaries, Dalgan Park, County Meath (n/d); Cork City Hall (1936) [Its Concert room is renowned for its superb acoustic]; Irish Pavilion for Empire World Exhibition, Glasgow (1938); The National Stadium (1939); St. Francis Church, Cork City (1949); Mill Hill missionaries, Freshford, County Kilkenny (n/d); Dublin Corporation Unbuilt Proposal, Wood Quay (1957).

For the first quarter century of its existence, Jones & Kelly was a practice of the old school, offering apprenticeships to applicants, over a hundred of who were indentured until the mid-1940s. Several were later to become notable Irish architects, including Timothy Joseph Ahern, Basil Boyd Barrett, Rupert Boyd Barrett, Jackie Collins, John Peter Butler, Vincent Gallagher, Patrick F. McDonnell, Dermot O’Dwyer, Donal O’Dwyer and Michael Scott. The latter who worked in the practice between 1923 and 1926, and much later designed Dublin's Busáras (bus station) and other buildings in the modern style, regarded Jones & Kelly's preoccupation with the Gothic, Renaissance or Romanesque as a straitjacket which was out of date and outmoded.

His grandson Alfred E Jones modernised the practice and designed some modern buildings such as 'The Marr House' in South Park, Howth. His main buildings are renovation and redevelopment of protected structures such as 'Stoneview' in Clarinda Park, Dun Laoghaire,

== Family ==
AE Jones lived in 7 AILESBURY ROAD, Dublin, Ireland - photo's archived here.

His great-grandson, Felix Jones, is an international rugby coach and former Ireland rugby player. Felix is also a holder of two Rugby World Cup Medals - The only Irishman with World Cup winner's medals.

== Wider interests ==
Alfred Jones was a man whose interests ranged well beyond the confines of his profession to embrace the historical, artistic and sporting. He had a lifelong interest in Archaeology and Egyptology. In the last decades of his life, he devoted much of his time to producing a comprehensive biographical index of Irish architects and engineers. He also trawled the Irish Builder for interesting material, transcribing his findings. The results of this labour, deposited in 1980, are now to be found in the Irish Architectural Archive, and are central to the Archive's database of Irish architects from 1720 to 1940. Fittingly his portrait adorns the I.A.A. reading room with an inscription paying tribute to the wealth and quality of his research. Alfred Jones was also a philatelist and possessed a highly regarded collection of early French and French Colonial stamps. In addition, he was a violinist who as a young man was known to have performed in the La Scala Theatre, Dublin. His sporting interests included life membership of the Old Belvedere R.F.C. and the Irish Amateur Boxing Association whose home (the National Stadium) had been designed by Jones & Kelly. Alfred was also a trustee of the organisation and served as its president for over 20 years.

== Death ==
Dying on 29 June 1973 Alfred Jones was interred in St. Maelruain's Churchyard cemetery at Tallaght, County Dublin, on 2 July. He was survived by his wife of 50 years Mary (née Ardiff) (1892–1986), and by his three children: Elizabeth, Felix, and Marie, a distinguished musician. Elizabeth and Felix maintained the practice of Jones & Kelly after their father's death.
