= Strabane Town Hall =

Municipal Building in Strabane, Northern Ireland

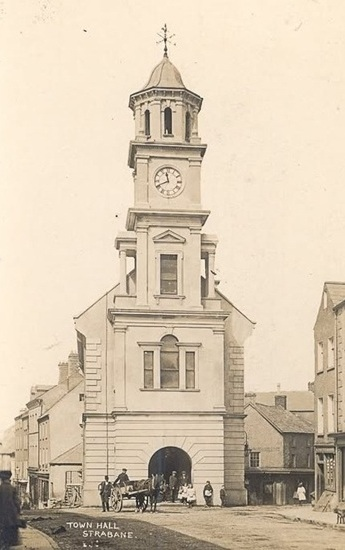
- The building in the early 20th century

- Shown in Northern Ireland
- 54.8251°N 7.4628°W
- Location: Upper Main Street, Strabane

History
- Built: 1766
- Demolished: 1972

Site notes
- Architectural style: Italianate style

Strabane Town Hall was a municipal structure in Upper Main Street, Strabane, County Tyrone, Northern Ireland. The structure was used as the offices and meeting place of Strabane Urban District Council until it was destroyed by a bomb in 1972.

== History ==
The building was commissioned to replace an earlier town hall on the same site in the Market Square. The new building was designed in the neoclassical style, built in rubble masonry and was completed in around 1766. The building was open on the ground floor, so that markets could be held, with an assembly room on the first floor, and a steeple designed by Sir William Chambers at the northwest end. The assembly room served as the meeting place of the old borough council.

After the area became an urban district in 1899, civic leaders decided to enlarge the building. The work was carried out to a design by the town surveyor, William Stuart, in the Italianate style and completed in 1904. The works, which involved the demolition of the steeple designed by Chambers and the creation of a new four stage tower at the southeast end, were criticised at the time. The new tower featured an opening with voussoirs in the first stage, a Venetian window in the second stage, an aedicula in the third stage and space for a clock in the fourth stage, all surmounted by an octagonal belfry with an ogee-shaped dome. A new clock was installed in the tower in 1908.

In January 1915, during the First World War, the entertainer, Percy French, performed in the building, singing songs and telling stories.

The building continued to be used as the meeting place of the urban district council for much of the 20th century. In October 1971, during The Troubles, the Social Democratic and Labour Party boycotted the Parliament of Northern Ireland and their members of parliament instead held their own meeting in Strabane Town Hall. Then, in February 1972, members of the Provisional Irish Republican Army attacked the building: after initially holding several members of staff hostage, the group, who were equipped with firearms, used two bombs and six cans of petrol to destroy it. The urban district council was briefly accommodated at temporary offices until, following implementation of the Local Government Act (Northern Ireland) 1972, it was replaced by the enlarged Strabane District Council. The new district council established itself in council offices on Derry Road.

A monument to commemorate the Easter Rising was placed in the Market Square, adjacent to the site of the town hall, in 2015.
