= Ballymena Town Hall =

Municipal Building in Ballymena, Northern Ireland

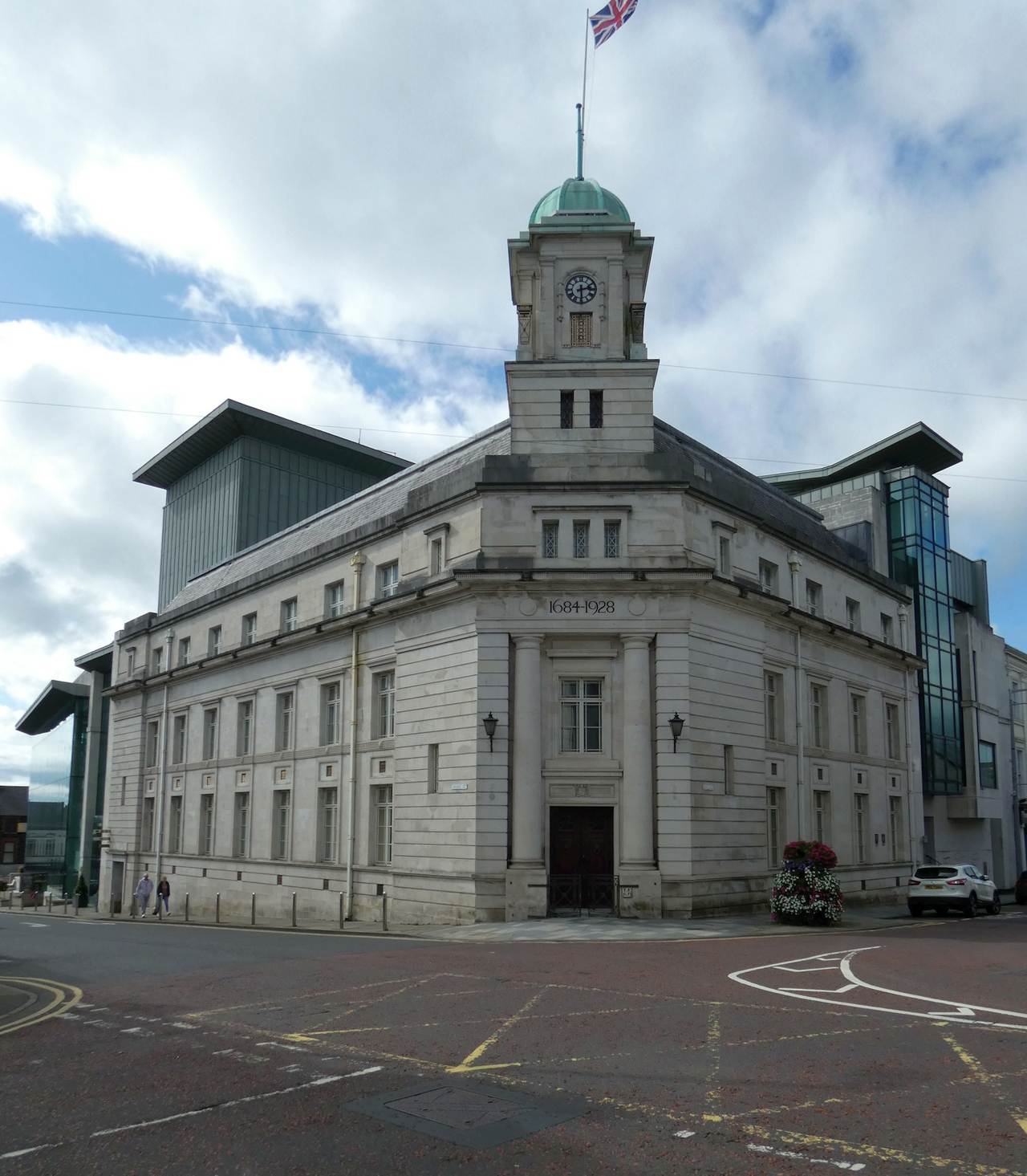
- Ballymena Town Hall

- Shown in Northern Ireland
- 54.8641°N 6.2764°W
- Location: Bridge Street, Ballymena

History
- Built: 1928

Site notes
- Architect: Jones and Kelly
- Architectural style: Neoclassical style

Listed Building – Grade B1
- Official name: Town Hall, Bridge Street / Mill Street (Museum and Arts Centre), Ballymena, County Antrim
- Designated: 22 November 1988
- Reference no.: HB 07/16/019

Ballymena Town Hall is a municipal structure in Bridge Street in Ballymena, County Antrim, Northern Ireland. The town hall, which is the headquarters of Mid and East Antrim Borough Council, is a Grade B1 listed building.

== History ==
The first municipal building in the town was a market hall in Bridge Street which was completed in 1684. It featured a steeple which was 60 feet (18 m) high, and was later referred to by the local member of parliament, Sir Robert Adair, as one of the "Seven Towers" of Ballymena. On 7 June 1798, during the 1798 rebellion, a force of about 10,000 United Irishmen led by James Dickie, stormed and burned the market hall, killing three of its defenders and forcing the surrender of the local yeomanry forces commanded by Robert Davison. The market hall, which by then also contained the local post office as well as the council chamber, burnt down in 1919.

In the early 1920s, civic leaders decided to create a new municipal building on the same site. The foundation stone for the new building was laid by the Duke of York on 24 July 1924. It was designed by Jones and Kelly in the neoclassical style, built in ashlar stone by John Carson at a cost of £26,400 and was officially opened by the Duke of Abercorn on 20 November 1928. The design involved a symmetrical frontage at the junction of Bridge Street and Mill Street; the corner section featured a doorway on the ground floor and a sash window on the first floor flanked by full-height Doric order columns supporting an entablature inscribed with the dates "1684–1928"; on the second floor there were three lancet windows and at roof level there was a two-stage clock tower with a canopy. Internally, the principal room was the council chamber.

The town was advanced to the status of municipal borough, with the town hall as its headquarters, in 1937. The town hall continued to serve as the meeting place of the enlarged Ballymena District Council after it was formed in 1973. As part a major programme of works costing £16.8 million, which were carried out to an architectural design by Consarc Design with museum design by Ralph Appelbaum Associates, the town hall was refurbished and extended to create an arts venue. It was officially opened by the Prince of Wales and the Duchess of Cornwall as the Braid Arts & Museum Centre, after the local river, on 21 May 2008. The town hall remained the local seat of government following the formation of the enlarged Mid and East Antrim Borough Council in April 2015.
