= Cashel Town Hall =

Municipal building in County Tipperary, Ireland

- Halla an Bhaile Caiseal
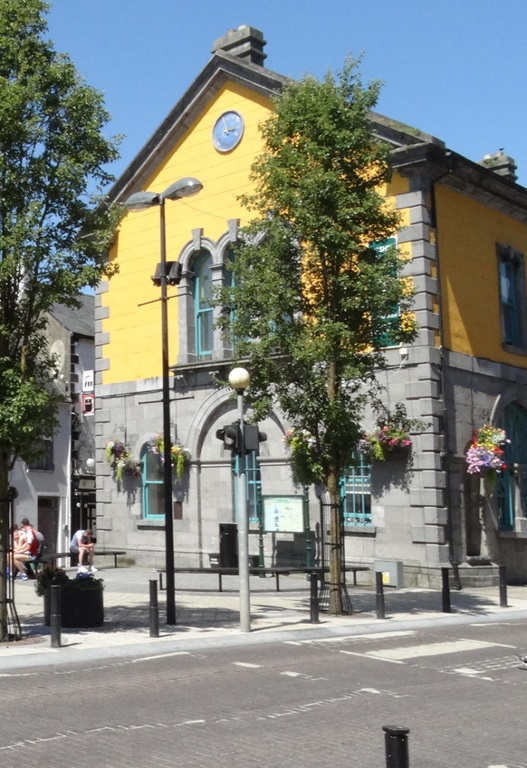
- Cashel Town Hall

- Location within Ireland

General information
- Architectural style: Neoclassical style
- Location: Main Street, Cashel, Ireland
- Coordinates: 52.5169°N 7.8876°W
- Completed: 1867

Design and construction
- Architect: James Edward Rogers

Cashel Town Hall (Irish: Halla an Bhaile Caiseal) is a municipal building in the middle of Main Street, Cashel, County Tipperary, Ireland. The building is currently used as a heritage centre and tourist information office.

== History ==
Elements of the current building date back at least to the 18th century. By the early 19th century, the ground floor was leased out, while regular markets for the sale of flax and yarn, sold for the benefit of the poor of Cashel, were held on the first floor. At that time the old borough council chose not the use the market house as their meeting place and instead met at the mayor's office in John Street. By 1864, the old market house had become very dilapidated, and the town commissioners agreed to rebuild it. The rebuilding was undertaken to a design by James Edward Rogers in the neoclassical style, executed by Robert Boles in ashlar stone at a cost of £616 and was completed in 1867. The construction work involved "a new roof and alterations", implying that the shell of the earlier building was retained.

The design involved a symmetrical main frontage of three bays facing southwest down Main Street. The central bay contained a large round headed opening, formed by imposts, voussoirs and a double keystone, which was blocked and contained a small round headed window. The outer bays contained round headed windows, while the first floor was fenestrated by an arcade of three connected round headed windows with a wide window sill supported by brackets. There was an open pediment above with a clock in the tympanum. The side elevation, consisting of five bays facing southeast onto Main Street, featured three round headed openings, formed by imposts, voussoirs and double keystones, with niches in the outer bays. It was fenestrated by three sash windows with architraves and keystones on the first floor.

The building was extended to the northeast in 1893. A memorial in the form of a celtic cross, intended to commemorate the life of the former Archbishop of Cashel, Thomas Croke, was erected to the southwest of the building in 1895.

In 1899, the town commissioners were replaced by an urban district council, with the town hall becoming the offices of the new council. The building continued to serve as a meeting place for Cashel Urban District Council until 2000, when the council relocated to new the Cashel Civic Offices (Irish: Áras Chaiseal Mumhan) in Friar Street. The town hall subsequently became a heritage centre and tourist information office. Exhibits in the heritage centre include the royal charters granted to town as well as a model of the town as it was in around 1640.
