= Cloyne Cathedral (disambiguation) =

Cloyne Cathedral may refer to either the cathedral church of the Diocese of Cloyne in the Church of Ireland or in the Roman Catholic Church. The former is situated in the village of Cloyne, County Cork in Ireland while the latter is situated 23km away by road in the town of Cobh on Great Island. See

- Cloyne Cathedral for the Church of Ireland cathedral
- St Colman’s cathedral, Cobh for the Roman Catholic Church cathedral

== See also ==
- Diocese of Cork, Cloyne and Ross in the Church of Ireland
- Roman Catholic Diocese of Cloyne
