= List of caves in Ireland =

This is a list of caves in Ireland as a whole, including those in Northern Ireland and the Republic of Ireland, as well as information on the largest and deepest caves in Ireland.

== Overview ==
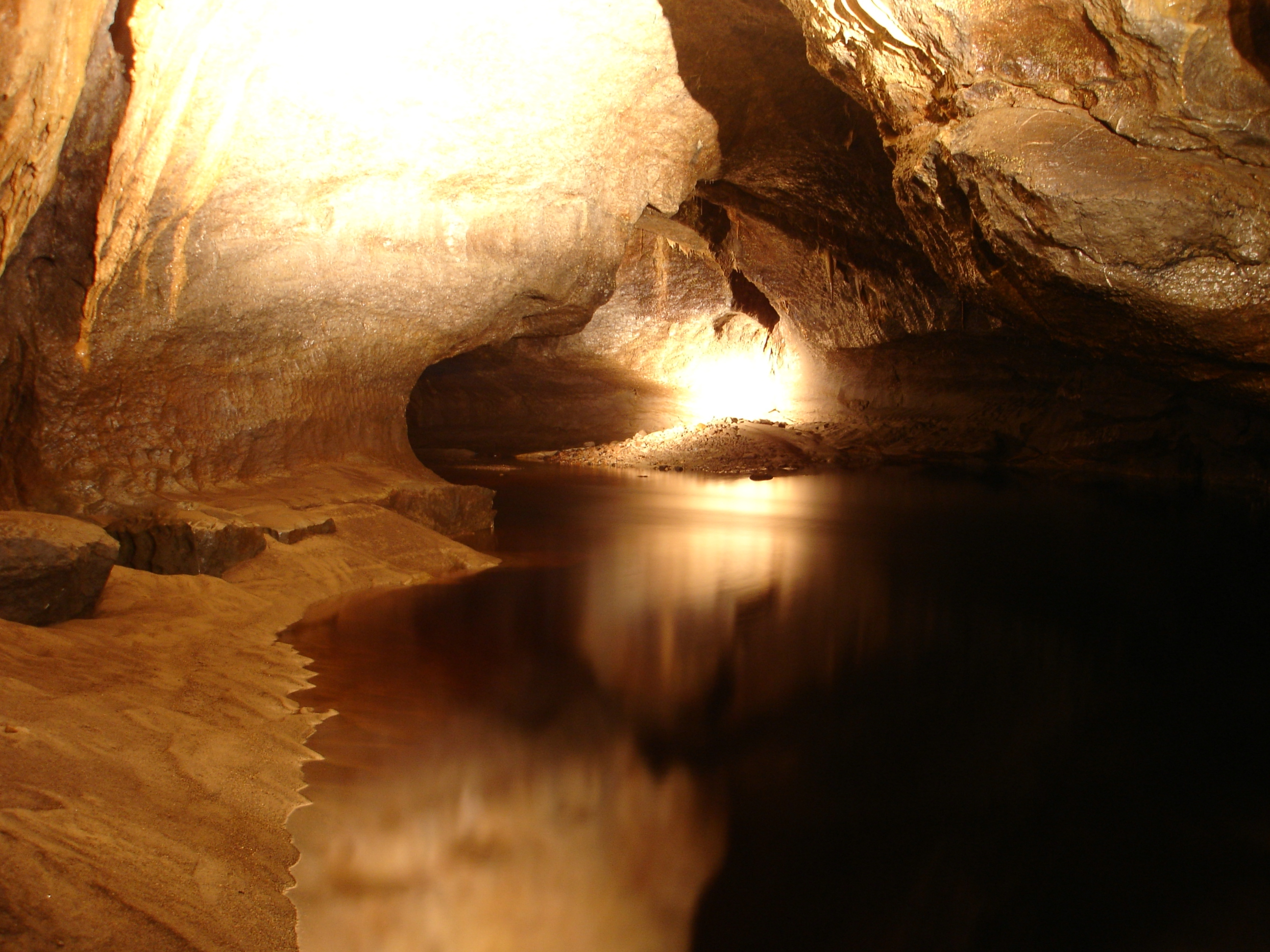
Typical County Fermanagh stream passage in Marble Arch Caves. At 11.5 km (7.1 mi), the system is the longest in Northern Ireland and second longest in Ireland.

- The deepest cave in Ireland is Reyfad Pot in County Fermanagh, Northern Ireland, 193 metres (633 ft) deep.
- The longest cave system in Ireland is Pollnagollum–Poulelva in County Clare, Republic of Ireland, with at least 16 kilometres (9.9 mi) of passageways.

== Search by region ==
- Caves of the Tullybrack and Belmore hills

== List of caves ==
Caves that lie partly or wholly within Northern Ireland are marked with an asterisk (*).
Mythological caves are marked with a dagger (†).

- Ailwee Cave, County Clare
- Badger Pot, County Fermanagh*
- Ballymaglancy Cave, County Galway
- Boho Caves, County Fermanagh*
- Cloyne Cave, County Cork
- Crag Cave, County Kerry
- Dunmore Cave, County Kilkenny
- Fintan's Grave, County Tipperary†
- Kelly's Cave, County Mayo
- Killavullen Caves, County Cork
- Marble Arch Caves, County Fermanagh*
- Mitchelstown Cave, County Tipperary
- Noon's Hole, County Fermanagh*
- Pol an Ionain, County Clare
- Pollatoomary, County Mayo
- Pollnagollum–Poulelva, County Clare
- Portbraddon Cave, County Antrim*
- Shannon Cave, County Cavan and County Fermanagh*

== See also ==
- Geography of Ireland
- List of caves
- Category:Caves of Ireland
