= William Crean =

Irish Roman Catholic prelate (born 1951)

The Most Reverend William Crean STL STM
- Bishop of Cloyne
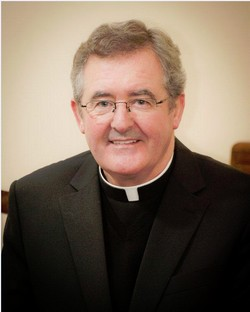
- Church: Roman Catholic
- Diocese: Cloyne
- Appointed: 25 November 2012
- Installed: 27 January 2013
- Predecessor: John Magee
- Other post: Chairperson of Trócaire
- Previous posts: Parish priest of Cahersiveen and Castlegregory; Chairperson of the Adult Religious Education National Association; Director of the John Paul II Pastoral Centre, Killarney; Advisor to Post-Primary Schools and Director of Adult Religious Education for the Diocese of Kerry; Chaplain at Tarbert Comprehensive School

Orders
- Ordination: 20 June 1976 by Eamonn Casey
- Consecration: 27 January 2013 by Charles John Brown

Personal details
- Born: 16 December 1951 (age 74) Tralee, County Kerry, Ireland
- Parents: Patrick and Margaret Crean
- Education: Weston School of Theology; Mount Oliver Institute of Education; Pontifical Gregorian University; St Patrick’s College, Maynooth
- Motto: Croí le brí nua (Heart with new vitality)
- Coat of arms

Styles of William Crean
- Reference style: The Most Reverend
- Spoken style: Your Grace
- Religious style: Bishop

William Crean (born 16 December 1951) is an Irish Roman Catholic prelate who has served as Bishop of Cloyne and chairperson of Trócaire since 2013.

== Early life and education ==
Crean was born in Tralee, County Kerry on 16 December 1951, one of eight children to Patrick Crean and his wife Margaret (née O’Donnell). He attended primary and secondary school in Tralee and at St Brendan's College, Killarney, before studying for the priesthood at St Patrick's College, Maynooth, where he completed a Bachelor of Arts in philosophy, and at the Pontifical Irish College, where he completed a Bachelor of Divinity at the Pontifical Gregorian University.

Crean was ordained to the priesthood for the Diocese of Kerry on 20 June 1976.

== Presbyteral ministry ==
Following ordination, Crean returned to Rome for further studies at the Pontifical Gregorian University, completing a Licentiate of Sacred Theology in 1977. He returned to the Diocese of Kerry in 1977 for his first pastoral appointment, as catechist and chaplain in Killorglin.

Creane was appointed curate in Glenbeigh in 1980, and subsequently chaplain to the comprehensive school in Tarbert in 1983. He completed a diploma in religious education at Mount Oliver Institute of Education, Dundalk, in 1987, before he was appointed director of the John Paul II Pastoral Centre in Killarney, as well as diocesan advisor to secondary schools and director of adult religious education. It was during this time that Crean also served as a founding director of Radio Kerry, representing the Ardfert Christian Media Trust, a joint shareholding by the Catholic Church and the Church of Ireland, as well as chairperson of the Adult Religious Education National Association (ARENA) and on the national executive of the National Conference of Priests of Ireland.

Crean returned to pastoral ministry in 1996, when he was appointed curate in Killorglin for two years, before undertaking sabbatical studies at Weston School of Theology in Boston, Massachusetts, completing a Master of Sacred Theology. He returned to the Diocese of Kerry in 1999, where he was appointed parish priest in Castlegregory, and subsequently in Cahersiveen in 2006.

== Episcopal ministry ==
Crean was appointed Bishop-elect of Cloyne by Pope Benedict XVI on 24 November 2012. He was consecrated by the Apostolic Nuncio to Ireland and titular archbishop of Aquileia, Charles John Brown, on 27 January 2013 in St Colman's Cathedral, Cobh.

Crean was appointed chairperson of Trócaire on 22 June 2013.

In his Christmas message in 2013, he warned that despite the recent departure of the EU/IMF troika, great hardship continues to be inflicted on vulnerable families and schools in Ireland. Crean called on political leaders to redress austerity measures taken during the European debt crisis or risk of reaping "a very negative social harvest in Irish society".

In advance of a referendum on liberalising abortion laws on 25 May 2018, Crean said in a pastoral letter that while he believed that individual personal experiences faced by women and their partners can be "sad and painful", he described the prospect of a "culture of abortion as a routine medical procedure” developing in Ireland as "horrendous".

In a homily for the church's Day for Life in October 2020, he criticised the timing of a bill introduced to the Oireachtas legislating for the legalisation of assisted suicide and euthanasia, calling it "disingenuous and unnecessary", adding that assisting in suicide would not only be "a false exercise of compassion", but also that tolerating its practice would be "flawed in its moral judgement".

In an interview with The Irish Times on 13 March 2023 reflecting on the tenth anniversary of the election of Pope Francis, Crean described him as "a disrupter in the interest of renewal", adding that Francis will be seen in future as a "prophetic figure".

Catholic Church titles
Preceded by John Magee	Bishop of Cloyne since 2013	Succeeded by incumbent
