= John Magee (bishop) =

Irish Roman Catholic bishop (born 1936)

The Most Reverend John Magee SPS
- Bishop Emeritus of Cloyne
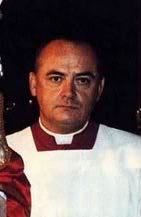
- Magee in 1984
- Church: Roman Catholic Church
- In office: 1987–2010
- Predecessor: John Ahern
- Successor: William Crean
- Other posts: Master of Pontifical Liturgical Celebrations (1982–1987); Bishop Emeritus of Cloyne (2010–present)

Orders
- Ordination: 17 March 1962
- Consecration: 17 March 1987 by Pope John Paul II

Personal details
- Born: 24 September 1936 (age 90) Newry, Northern Ireland

John Magee SPS (born 24 September 1936) is a Roman Catholic bishop emeritus in Ireland. He was Bishop of Cloyne from 1987 to 2010; following scandal he resigned from that position on 24 March 2010, becoming a bishop emeritus. Magee is the only person to have been private secretary to three popes.

== Early life and education ==
He was born in Newry Northern Ireland, in the Roman Catholic Diocese of Dromore, on 24 September 1936. His father was a dairy farmer. He was educated at St Colman's College in Newry and entered the St Patrick's Missionary Society at Kiltegan, County Wicklow, in 1954. He also attended University College Cork where he obtained a degree in philosophy before going to study theology in Rome, where he was ordained priest on 17 March 1962.

He served as a missionary priest in Nigeria for almost six years before being appointed Procurator General of St Patrick's Society in Rome. In 1969 he was an official of the Congregation for the Evangelization of Peoples in Rome, when he was chosen by Pope Paul VI to be one of his private secretaries. On Pope Paul's death he remained in service as a private secretary to his successor, Pope John Paul I and Pope John Paul II. Magee is the only man to hold the position of private secretary to three Popes in Vatican history.

He also acted as chaplain to the Vatican's Swiss Guard.

== Papal service ==
=== Paul VI ===
The now Saint Paul VI treated Magee kindly and paternally; both joined on the Feast Day of St. John the Baptist to celebrate their name day. On their last such encounter Paul VI gave Magee an icon of St. John the Baptist that he received from the King of Jordan. When Paul VI was beatified in October 2014 Magee travelled to Rome where he led the procession of bishops.

=== John Paul II ===
He remained for a time in the same capacity with Pope John Paul II until appointed papal Master of Pontifical Liturgical Celebrations in 1982, and was appointed Bishop of the Diocese of Cloyne, Ireland on 17 February 1987. He was consecrated bishop on 17 March 1987, St. Patrick's Day, by Pope John Paul II at St. Peter's Basilica in the Vatican.

On 28 April 1981 Magee travelled, without the knowledge or approval of the Vatican's Secretariat of State, to Long Kesh Prison outside Belfast, Northern Ireland, to meet with IRA hunger striker Bobby Sands. Magee sought, unsuccessfully, to convince Sands to end his hunger strike; Sands died the following week.

== Bishop of Cloyne ==
=== Interest in vocations ===
Magee played a role in the Irish Catholic Bishops' Conference where he was featured in the modernisation of the liturgy in Ireland. His pastoral approach placed heavy emphasis on the promotion of vocations to the priesthood but, after some initial success, the number of vocations in the diocese of Cloyne declined, a trend reflected across the island of Ireland. He appointed Ireland's first female "faith developer" and entrusted her with the task of transforming an Irish rural diocese into a cosmopolitan pastoral model using techniques borrowed from several urban dioceses in the United States.

=== Cathedral redecoration dispute ===
Magee involved himself in a dispute with the Friends of St Colman's Cathedral, a local conservationist group in Cobh which organised an effective and professional opposition to the Bishop's plans to re-order the interior of Cobh Cathedral, plans similar to previous re-orderings in Killarney, Cork and Limerick cathedrals. In an oral hearing conducted by An Bord Pleanála, the Irish Planning Board, it emerged that irregularities had occurred in the planning application that were traced to Cobh Town Council, which accommodated the Bishop's plans to modify the Victorian interior designed by E W Pugin and George Ashlin. On 2 June 2006, when Bishop Magee was in Lourdes, An Bord Pleanála directed Cobh Town Council to refuse the Bishop's application.

On 25 July 2006, Magee published a pastoral letter stating: "As a result of An Bord Pleanála's decision, the situation concerning the temporary plywood altar still remains unresolved and needs to be addressed. The Diocese will initiate discussions with the planning authorities in an attempt to find a solution, which would be acceptable from both the liturgical and heritage points of view."

A diocesan official explained that the bishop did not wish to institute a judicial review in the Irish High Court because of the financial implications of such an action and because of the bishop's desire to avoid a Church-State clash.

Claims that the decision of An Bord Pleanála infringed the constitutional property rights of religious bodies were dismissed when it was revealed that the cathedral is the property of a secular trust established in Irish law. It is estimated that Bishop Magee spent over €200,000 in his bid to re-order Cobh Cathedral. The controversy was reported even outside Ireland, as shown in the external links below.

A February 2006 article by Kieron Wood in The Sunday Business Post claimed that Magee did not have the backing of the Vatican in his proposals for St Colman's. At the oral hearing of An Bord Pleanála he was requested to provide a copy of the letter from the Vatican in which he claimed he had been given approval for the modernising of Cobh Cathedral. The letter that he produced was a congratulatory message dated 9 December 2003 [no. 158/99/L) to the team of architects who worked on the cathedral project from Cardinal Francis Arinze, Prefect of the Congregation for Divine Worship and the Discipline of the Sacraments. The whole text of this letter was then reproduced in a publication called Conserving Cobh Cathedral: The Case Stated pp. 108–109.

=== 2006 ad limina visit ===
At a meeting of his liturgical advisers and diocesan clergy in November 2006, Bishop Magee spoke of his conversation with the Pope in the course of that ad limina visit at the end of the previous month. He mentioned that he had been closely questioned on several aspects of his proposals to re-order Cobh Cathedral. It was obvious, he said, that the Pope had been kept well informed of the entire issue.

Bishop Magee's contribution to the ad limina visit concerned not only his diocese of Cloyne but also ceremonial matters (an area of expertise for him) on behalf of the Conference. He also facilitated the broadcasting, in coincidence with the visit, of a life of Pope John Paul I prepared some months earlier by Italian state television (RAI). In an interview published on the Italian Catholic daily Avvenire on 26 October 2006, Cardinal Secretary of State Tarcisio Bertone criticised the image that the programme presented of Pope John Paul I.

After the ad limina visit, Bishop Magee represented the Irish bishops at a meeting in Rome of the International Commission for Eucharistic Congresses.

== Child sex abuse inquiry ==
In December 2008, Magee was at the centre of a controversy concerning his handling of child sex abuse cases by clergy in the diocese of Cloyne. Calls for his resignation followed. On 7 March 2009, Magee announced that, at his request, the Pope had placed the running of the diocese in the hands of Dermot Clifford, metropolitan archbishop of the Archdiocese of Cashel and Emly, to whose ecclesiastical province the diocese of Cloyne belongs. Magee remained Bishop of Cloyne, but withdrew from administration in order, he said, to dedicate his full-time to the matter of the inquiry. On 24 March 2010, the Holy See announced that Magee had formally resigned from his duties as Bishop of Cloyne.

The subsequent report of the Irish government judicial inquiry, The Cloyne Report, published on 13 July 2011, found that Bishop Magee's second in command, Monsignor Denis O'Callaghan, then the parish priest of Mallow, had falsely told the Government and the HSE in a previous inquiry that the diocese was reporting all allegations of clerical child sexual abuse to the civil authorities.

The inquiry into Cloyne – the fourth examination of clerical abuse in the Church in Ireland – found the greatest flaw in the diocese was repeated failure to report all complaints. It found nine allegations out of 15 were not passed on to the Garda.

Speaking in August 2011 Magee said that he felt "horrified and ashamed" by abuse in his diocese. Magee said he accepted "full responsibility" for the findings. He added that "I feel ashamed that this happened under my watch – it shouldn't have and I truly apologise," he said. "I did endeavour and I hoped that those guidelines that I issued in a booklet form to every person in the diocese were being implemented but I discovered they were not and that is my responsibility."

Magee also offered to meet abuse victims and apologised "on bended knee". "I beg forgiveness, I am sorry and I wish to say that if they wish to come and see me privately I will speak with them and offer my deepest apology," he said. Bishop Magee said he had been "truly horrified" when he read the full extent of the abuse in the report. However, a victim said apologies would "never go far enough". "It's too late for us now, the only thing it's not too late for is that maybe there will be a future where people will be more enlightened, more aware and protect their children better," she said. Asked about restitution for victims, Magee said it was a matter for the Cloyne Diocese.

== International profile ==
Shortly before Pope John Paul II died on 2 April 2005, the Pope's Polish personal secretary, Stanisław Dziwisz, called Magee urgently to Rome, where he arrived the day after the Pope's death.

Who's Who in Ireland [2006] described Magee as "remote [and] low profile". It commented that many ecclesiastical observers "expected him to return to Vatican City by now" and remarked that the "red hat [of a cardinal] still eludes him" (cf. Who's Who in Ireland [2006], p. 233).

In the 2007 play The Last Confession, which centred on events surrounding the death of Pope John Paul I, the Pope's valet claimed that Magee was responsible for the Pontiff's death and that he fled after committing the act. Magee is represented as interrogated by a committee of cardinals and explaining why he had to leave Rome after the Pope's death.

April 2008 brought renewed speculation that Magee was being considered for a position in the Roman Curia. The French left-wing clerical review Golias reported that the Irishman was in the running to succeed as head of the Congregation for Divine Worship and the Discipline of the Sacraments. The review suggested that Magee's support for the Latin Mass had won him the Pope's approval, and it said that the bishop's apparent lack of ambition and shyness eminently qualified him for a position in the Vatican.

In September 2008, as the world prepared to mark the 30th anniversary of the death of John Paul I, the Italian weekly Diva e Donna published an interview with Magee, presenting it as the first time he had broken his silence on the events surrounding the death of John Paul I, which he attributed to exhaustion brought on by the stress of the initial period following his election. Magee said he had been accused of having poisoned the Pope and had even been questioned by INTERPOL.

== Health ==
In 2007, for the third year in succession, Magee failed to complete his personal schedule of confirmations in Cloyne diocese.

On 12 May 2007 Magee was admitted to the Bon Secours Hospital in Cork to undergo a knee replacement operation. All official engagements were cancelled for the next ten weeks to allow him to recuperate, after which he resumed work.

He resigned as Bishop of Cloyne on 24 March 2010. and was eventually succeeded by Canon William Crean whose appointment came on 25 November 2012.

Catholic Church titles
Preceded by Virgilio Noè	Master of Pontifical Liturgical Celebrations; 1982 – 17 February 1987	Succeeded by Piero Marini
Preceded by John Ahern	Bishop of Cloyne; 17 February 1987 – 24 March 2010	Succeeded by William Crean
