= Cloyne Cathedral =

Cathedral in Cork, Ireland

St. Colman's Cathedral, Cloyne
- Ard-Eaglais Naomh Colmán, Cluain
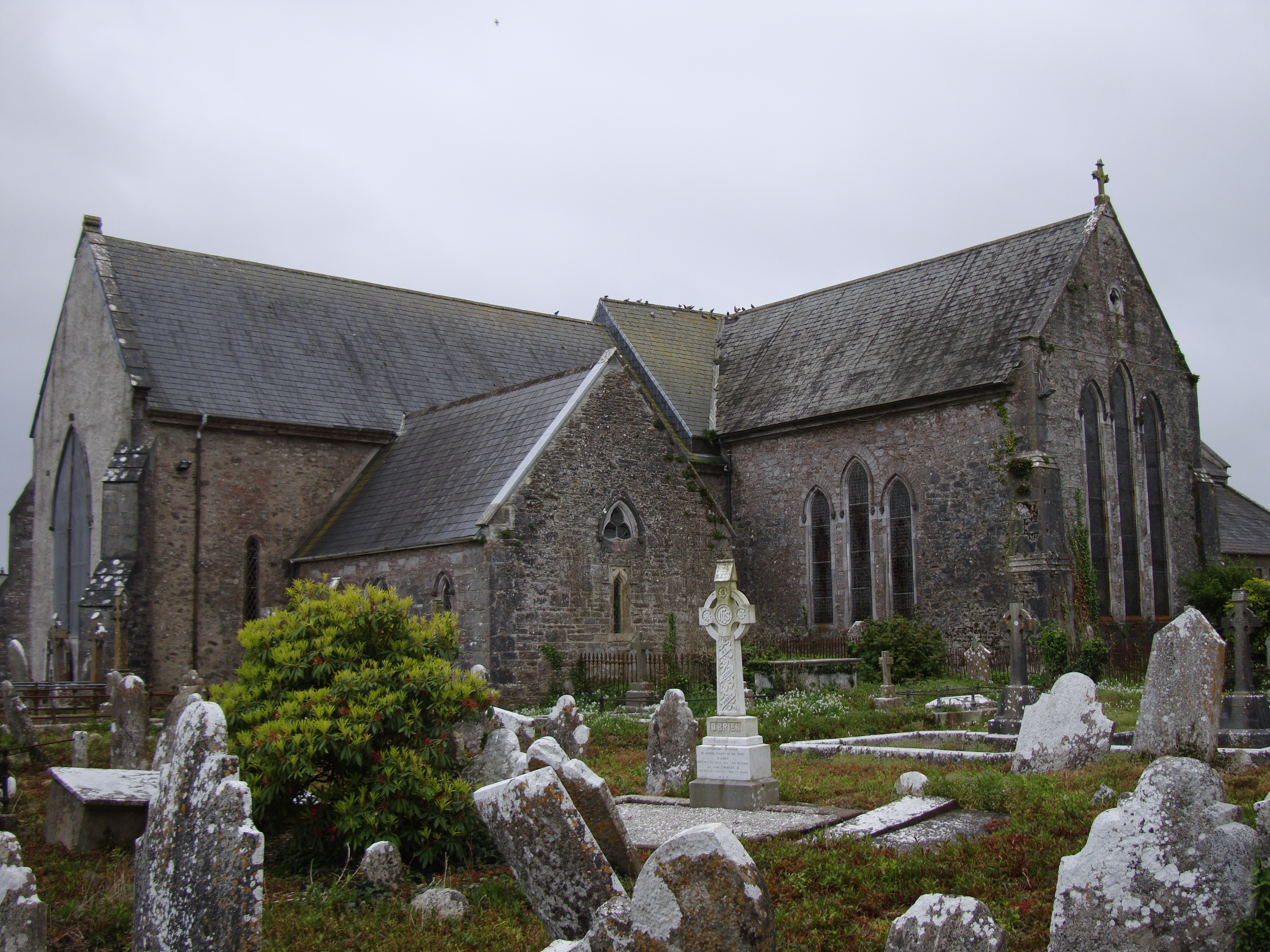
- St. Colman's Cathedral, Cloyne
- 51°51′42″N 8°07′10″W
- Denomination: Church of Ireland
- Previous denomination: Roman Catholic
- Website: cork.anglican.org

History
- Dedication: Colmán of Cloyne

Architecture
- Heritage designation: Protected Structure #00587

Administration
- Province: Province of Dublin
- Diocese: Diocese of Cork, Cloyne and Ross

Clergy
- Bishop: Paul Colton
- Dean: The Very Revd Susan Green

St. Colman's Cathedral, Cloyne (Irish: Ard-Eaglais Naomh Colmán, Cluain) is a cathedral of the Church of Ireland in Cloyne, County Cork in Ireland. It is in the ecclesiastical province of Dublin.

Previously the cathedral of the Diocese of Cloyne, it is now one of three cathedrals in the United Dioceses of Cork, Cloyne and Ross. Cloyne Round Tower is across the road from the cathedral and was at one time used as the tower for the cathedral bell.

== History ==
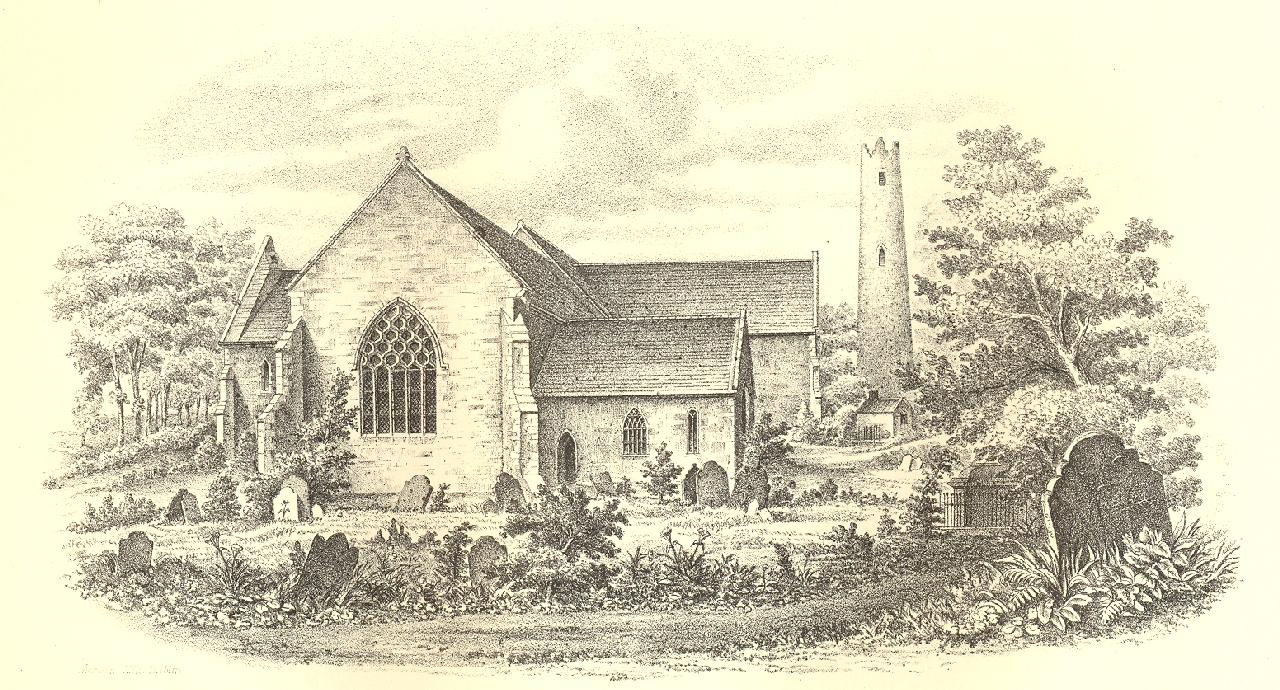
Cathedral Church of St. Colman and Round Tower from 1873

=== Early history ===
The cathedral traces its origins to a monastic settlement founded in 560 by Colmán of Cloyne. The site for his monastery and monastic school at Cloyne (Irish: Cluain Uamha or "Meadow of the Caves") was donated by Coirpre Cromm mac Crimthainn, King of Munster. The cathedral was plundered by the Vikings in 822, 824 and 885. In the 885 raid, the abbot, prior, and several others were killed, and Cloyne is not mentioned in the monastic annals again until 1060. Bishop Nehemias of Cloyne is noted as having died in 1149, shortly before Cloyne was recognised as a diocese at the Synod of Kells in 1152.

A series of churches were built on the site, with the present building dating from between 1250 and the 1270s. A building on the grounds of the cathedral, known as the "Fire House", may once have been an oratory, or alternatively may have been used by a female order to keep a fire continuously burning.

=== 17th century ===
During the 1641 Rebellion, the church was damaged. It was repaired in 1642. Considerable work was also carried out on the choir of the church in the 17th century. A girl named Mary Smyth died in 1675, and was buried beneath the floor of the nave. Her burial place is marked with a horseshoe (the symbol of the farrier, or smith) carved into the ground. Known as the "devil's footprint", local superstition claims that this is a footprint left by Satan. A pre-reformation foundation that emerged from the Reformation, the Cathedral took its place in the Church of Ireland, part of the Anglican Communion

=== 18th century ===
In 1705, repairs were carried out on the chapter house and the choir was enlarged. In an effort to make the cathedral look "more Gothic", works were carried out on the cathedral throughout the 18th and 19th centuries. In either 1705, or 1706, the cathedral was reroofed, and the battlements in the walls of the nave were removed. In 1733 the new roof underwent restoration. In 1774, the "Great Arch" was removed from the entrance to the choir. In 1776, the cross wall in the choir was removed. During these works, a row of graves were found beneath the foundation of the church. The graves consisted of "brick coffins", matching the shapes of the corpses within them. On Shrove Tuesday 1781, a "violent hurricane" severely damaged the cathedral. The north side of the churchyard wall was blown over, and 88 panes of glass in the cathedral was shattered. It took a team of slaters 11 days to repair the damage done to the roof, using 1,200 slates in the process.

=== 19th century – present ===
In 1856 new windows were added to the choir, an area of the church that went under substantial renovation in the 1890s. Theses renovations included a new ceiling, new choir stalls, the removal of the gallery on the western wall, and the relocation of the organ.

It served as the cathedra of the bishopric of Cloyne until 1835, when it was united with the Diocese of Cork.

Renovations were carried out to plans by Arthur Hill, the costs of which were covered by an anonymous donor from India. These may have been the renovations undertaken between 1891 and 1894, or they may have taken place in 1911.

== Architecture ==
The original 13th-century cruciform development remains the core of the cathedral today. Some sources suggest that there was once a tower at the intersection of the transepts, while others say that while older sources mention a tower being there, there is no evidence to support such a claim.

Arched windows in the south transept of the cathedral are an example of Early English Gothic architecture. Other windows in the cathedral are in the Decorated Gothic style. In 1837 Samuel Lewis described the building as being built "in the later English style of architecture". The cathedral features several stained glass windows including one depicting Saint Colmán.

=== Cloyne Round Tower ===
Cloyne Round Tower was constructed in either the tenth or eleventh century, and was used as a bell tower by the monks. It was again used as a bell tower from 1683. In 1749 it was struck by lightning.

== Notable clergy ==
- George Berkeley, a philosopher in honour of whom the University of California, Berkeley, and the city of Berkeley, California, are named, served as Bishop of Cloyne from 1734 to 1753.
- John Brinkley served as Bishop of Clyone from 1826 until his death in 1835. He was made Archdeacon of Clogher, and was also a famous astronomer. He was Professor of Astronomy at Trinity College Dublin, and President of the Royal Irish Academy. He was the last bishop to reside in Cloyne. A memorial to Brinkley can be found in the nave of the church, which features a globe, a telescope, and a Bible.

== See also ==
- List of abbeys and priories in Ireland (County Cork)
- Dean of Cloyne – chronological list of the Deans of Cloyne
