= Diocese of Cloyne =

Diocese of Cloyne may refer to:

- Diocese of Cloyne (Catholic)
- Diocese of Cork, Cloyne and Ross (Church of Ireland)
