= Feidlimid mac Coirpri Chruimm =

Feidlimid mac Coirpri Chruimm was a supposed king of Munster from the Glendamnach branch of the Eoganachta. Not mentioned as king in the Annals or the Book of Leinster, he is mentioned in the Laud Synchronisms as successor to his father Coirpre Cromm mac Crimthainn (died 577). However, the other references mention Feidlimid mac Tigernaig as king. According to the historians T. M. Charles-Edwards and F. J. Byrne, these lists seem to favour the Glendamnach line and may be artificial.

Feidlimid mac Coirpri Chruimm Eóganachta
Regnal titles
Preceded by Coirpre Cromm mac Crimthainn	King of Cashel c. 577 – 596 with Ferghus Scannal mac Crimthainn (c. 577–582)	Succeeded by Amalgaid mac Éndai and Garbán mac Éndai

== See also ==
- Kings of Munster
