= Cloyne =

Town in County Cork, Ireland

Cloyne Cluain
- Town
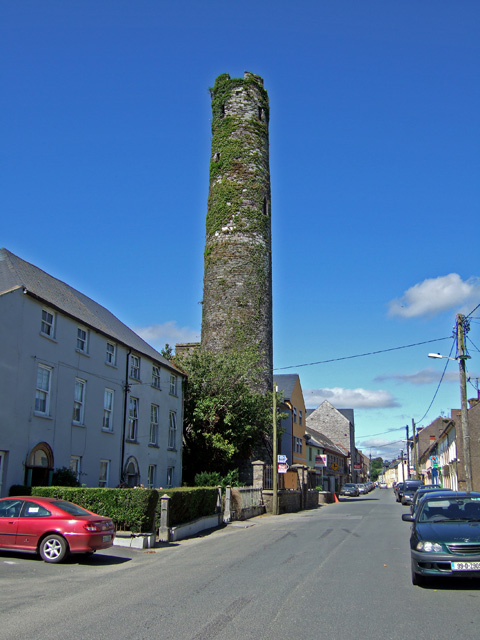
- Cloyne Round Tower in 2007

- Location in Ireland
- Coordinates: 51°51′47″N 08°07′15″W
- Country: Ireland
- Province: Munster
- County: County Cork
- Dáil constituency: Cork East
- EU Parliament: South

Population (2022)
  - Total: 1,967
- Time zone: UTC+0 (WET)
  - Summer (DST): UTC−1 (IST (WEST))
- Postal district(s): County Cork
- Dialing code: 021, 465 2
- Website: cloyne.ie

Cloyne (Irish: Cluain) is a small town located to the southeast of Midleton in eastern County Cork, Ireland. It is also a see city of the Anglican (Church of Ireland) Diocese of Cork, Cloyne and Ross, while also giving its name to a Roman Catholic diocese. The town is in a civil parish of the same name. St Colman's Cathedral in Cloyne is a cathedral church of the Church of Ireland while the Pro Cathedral of the Roman Catholic Diocese of Cloyne, Cobh Cathedral of Saint Colman, overlooks Cork Harbour. Cloyne is within the Cork East Dáil constituency.

Historical population
Year	Pop.	±%
1821	1,847	—
1831	2,227	+20.6%
1841	2,200	−1.2%
1851	1,713	−22.1%
1861	1,434	−16.3%
1871	1,235	−13.9%
1881	1,126	−8.8%
1891	995	−11.6%
1901	827	−16.9%
1911	756	−8.6%
1926	712	−5.8%
1936	684	−3.9%
1946	620	−9.4%
1951	620	+0.0%
1956	607	−2.1%
1961	612	+0.8%
1966	634	+3.6%
1971	654	+3.2%
1981	602	−8.0%
1986	721	+19.8%
1991	731	+1.4%
1996	673	−7.9%
2002	785	+16.6%
2006	1,095	+39.5%
2011	1,562	+42.6%
2016	1,803	+15.4%

== History ==
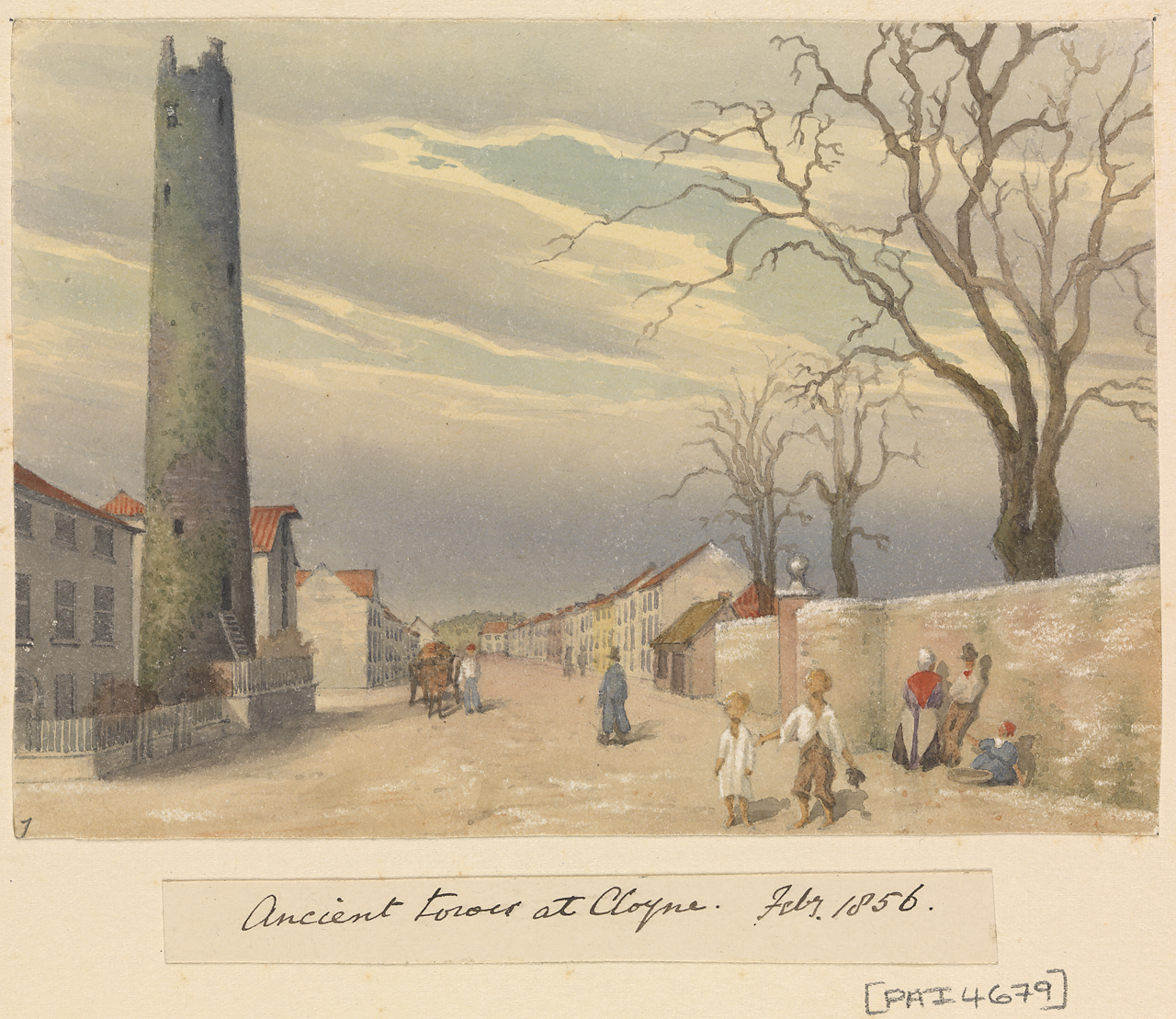
Cloyne as painted by Sir Edward Fanshawe in 1856.

The first evidence of settlement in Cloyne is a 4000-year-old portal dolmen that lies to the West of the town. The bishopric of Cloyne was founded by St. Colman Mac Léníne, (530–606 A.D.) as his principal monastery in the sixth century. The origin legend Conall Corc and the Corco Loígde claims that the land for the foundation of the monastery was not given by the local king, but by Coirpre mac Crimthainn (d. c. 580 A.D.), who was king of Munster from the Eóganacht Glendamnach:

Coirpre mac Crimthainn it was who gave Cloyne to God and to Colman mac Colcon who is also called Mac Lénéne and Aired Cechtraige and Cell Náile. Because of this they [the Eoganacht Glendamnach] are entitled to secular rule.

The Danes plundered Cloyne in 822, 824 and again in 885 when, according to the Annals of the Four Masters, the Abbot and Prior of the monastery were killed. The Annals of Inisfallen mention that in 978 A.D. the people of Ossory plundered Cloyne and that in 1088 A.D. Diarmait Ua Briain devastated it. Cloyne was recognised as a diocese at the Synod of Kells in 1152. The only major action of the Irish War of Independence in Cloyne was on 4 May 1920 when Irish Republican Army volunteers of the Fourth Battalion attacked the local Royal Irish Constabulary barracks. The volunteers at first failed to gain entry but succeed in setting fire to the building, which resulted in the entire surrender of the garrison. The prisoners had their hands tied before being ordered to march the road to Midleton while the flying column made their escape.

== Climate and geography ==
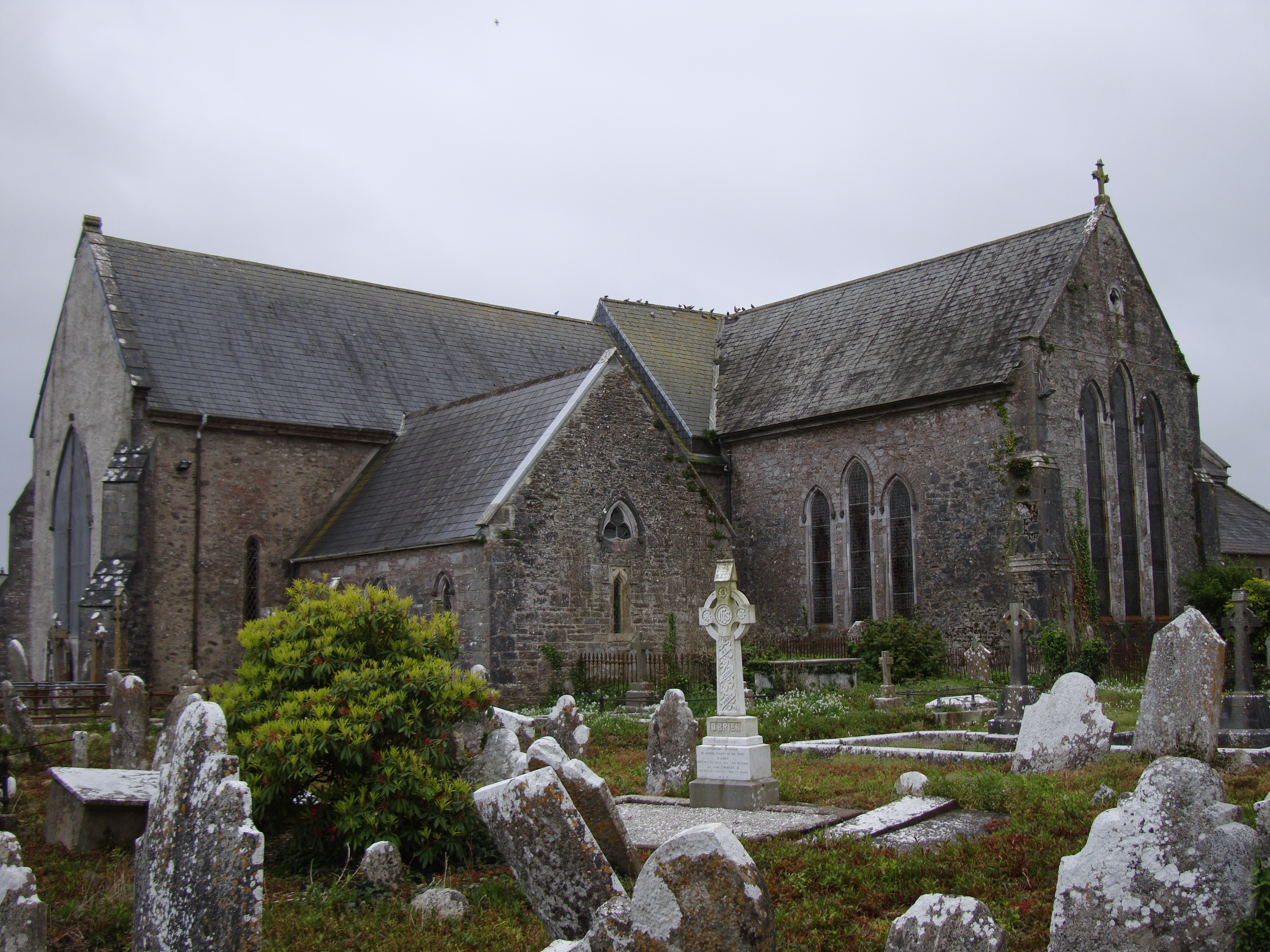
Cloyne Cathedral

Cloyne is situated approximately 7.6 kilometres from the major town of Midleton. The town is located at the bottom of a valley and is surrounded by large hills to the North and South as well as the Celtic Sea to the East and Cork Harbour to the West.

Being only 2 miles (3.2 km) from Cork harbour and 3.5 miles (5.6 km) from the open ocean, Cloyne has a mild climate with few extremes of temperature. The highest recorded temperature was 31.1 °C (88.0 °F), on 3 August 1995 and the lowest was −7.1 °C (19.2 °F), recorded on 2 January 1979 and also on 13 January 1987.

The climate of Cloyne is mild all year round, with an average of only six days of frost each year. Snow is almost unknown, with notable exceptions in March 1993, January 2010, and Storm Emma in March 2018. 2010 was also one of the frostiest years recorded for the Cloyne area, with 62 days recording an air frost, over 10 times the average.

Rainfall averages around 1041 mm (41.5 in) per annum, with the wettest weather usually occurring between October and January. The driest year ever recorded was in 1975 when 583.7 mm fell, while the wettest was in 2009 with 1433.4 mm.

== Places of interest ==
Cloyne has a round tower which is the town's symbol. The tower dates back to about 560 A.D. when St. Colman founded his monastery. In 1749 a lightning strike caused some damage to the top of the tower. There is also ruins of a Norman watchtower on a hill overlooking the town. The Church of Ireland in Cloyne, St. Colman's Cathedral, was first founded in 1250 AD. The local Roman Catholic church, St. Colmans, was built in 1815 and celebrates Mass every day of the week.

== Demographics ==
According to the 2011 Census, people of Irish ethnicity make up 86.2% of the population with mostly Polish and British people making up the rest. In terms of religion, 87% of Cloyne's population are Roman Catholic, 7% belong to other religions (e.g. Church of Ireland, Presbyterian, Islam) and 6% state no religion. 601 persons could speak the Irish language and 71 people could speak Polish.

== Economy ==
The land around Cloyne is rich and fertile, being mainly of limestone base. This makes it suitable for agriculture, with many acres of wheat and barley harvested each year. The underlying limestone rock also gives rise to a network of caves under and to the south of the town. Cloyne Cave, which is the biggest in County Cork, is estimated to be up to 7 km long. A section of the main street collapsed into the caves during the 20th century. The cave is accessible from the grounds of Cloyne House on Rock Street. (Permission must be sought from the owner as these are private grounds). The town has a number of pubs and small shops in the centre of town while there is also a Chinese and traditional Irish restaurant in the town.

== Notable people ==
- George Berkeley (1685–1753), the Anglo-Irish philosopher, was the Church of Ireland Bishop of Cloyne from 1734 until his retirement in 1752. There is a monument to him in the north transept of Cloyne Cathedral. One year after arriving in Cloyne, he wrote The Querist, the first of three volumes containing questions on the social and economic problems of Ireland. He was known in Cloyne as a dedicated pastor as well as a scholar, who personally ministered to the sick and destitute of the parish.
- Nicholas Joseph Clayton (1840–1916), a Victorian-era architect based in Texas, was born in Cloyne. He moved, with his widowed mother, to the United States in the 1840s and eventually to Galveston, Texas. The historic district of Galveston features a number of Clayton's buildings that have survived the ravages of storms and fires through the years.
- Cynthia Longfield (1896–1991), an entomologist and explorer, was born and lived in Cloyne up until her death in 1991. She also served as a driver in the Royal Army Service Corps during World War I, and is buried in Cloyne Cathedral.
- Sir John Madden (1844–1918), a judge and politician in Australia, was born in Cloyne. He emigrated to Australia with his family in 1857 and served as the Chief Justice of the Supreme Court of Victoria before his death in 1918.
- Christy Ring (1920–1979), the noted Cork hurler, was born and grew up in Cloyne where he learned to hurl before joining Glen Rovers in Cork city. He is buried in Cloyne and is also commemorated locally by a statue.
- Several modern-day hurlers with the Cork senior hurling team, including Dónal Óg Cusack (b.1977), Diarmuid "The Rock" O'Sullivan (b.1978) and his brother Paudie O'Sullivan (b.1988), are from Cloyne.

== Education ==
The local primary school is St. Colman's National School.

== Sport ==
Cloyne GAA is the local Gaelic Athletic Association club. They play in the traditional kit of red and black stripes. The club has two grounds known locally as the "old" and "new" pitches.

Churchvilla FC is the local soccer club. The club was formed in 1968 and has since grown to 150 players in both juvenile and senior teams.

== See also ==
- List of abbeys and priories in Ireland (County Cork)
- List of towns and villages in Ireland
