= Charles Guilfoyle Doran =

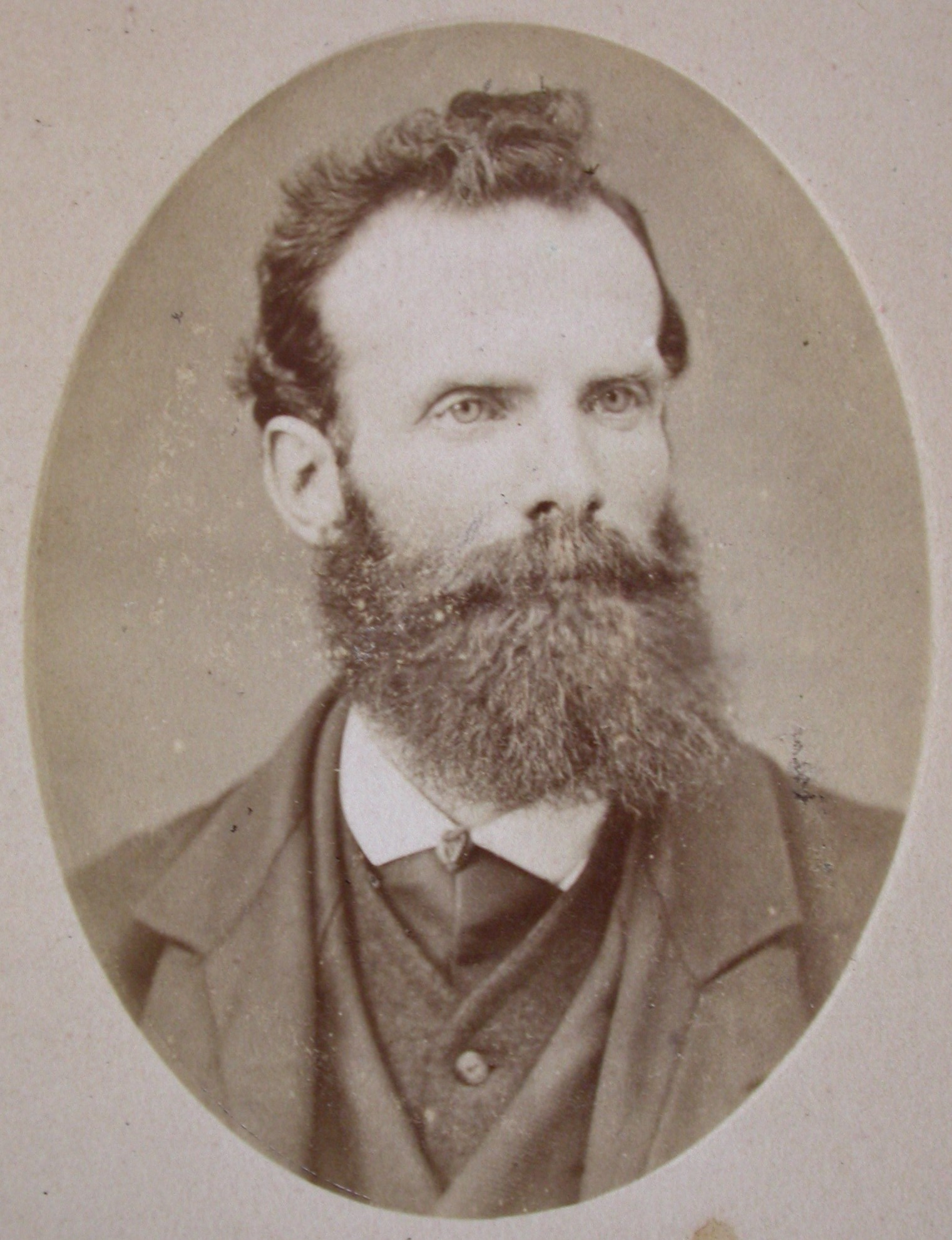
Charles Guilfoyle Doran

Charles Guilfoyle Doran (1835–1909) was a leading figure in the Irish Republican Brotherhood (IRB) and the Fenian Brotherhood in Ireland from the middle of the 19th century. He was also Clerk of Works on the construction of St. Colman's Cathedral in Cobh, County Cork.

== Early life ==
Doran was born in Knockananna, County Wicklow, on 1 February 1835. While still a young boy Doran's family moved to Cobh (then known as Queenstown) where he grew up. After leaving school Doran trained as a civil engineer and in 1866 he was employed by the architects E.W. Pugin and George Ashlin as Clerk of Works to oversee the construction of St. Colman's Cathedral in his adopted hometown. Completion of the cathedral was to continue throughout his lifetime.

== Irish revolutionary ==
Influenced by Irish republican historical figures, especially Wolfe Tone, Doran was a founding member of the United Brethren of St. Patrick which organised the funeral of the nationalist and Fenian Terence MacManus who had led the Young Ireland rebellion of 1848. This led Doran into closer contact with militant separatists and into the Fenian Brotherhood and I.R.B. By the mid-1860s he had risen to be one of the leading figures in the movement. At the time of the Fenian Rising of 1867 Doran was second in command to General William Halpin.

After the abortive rising Doran fled to France, where he became acquainted with Patrice de MacMahon and with John Patrick Leonard (one of the most notable Irish residents in France). During the Franco-Prussian War of 1870/1871, he seems to have acted as a war correspondent. At some point afterwards he returned to Ireland and resumed work at his beloved cathedral in Queenstown.

During the 1870s Doran was elected to the 11-man supreme council of the IRB, where he represented Munster. Doran acted as a secretary for the council, using his experience as a war journalist to create notes in Taylor shorthand. During this time Doran actively campaigned for the release of imprisoned Fenians. Like most other members of the IRB, Doran had little faith that parliamentary politics would result in Irish Independence, however, unlike some of his peers, Doran persuaded other members of the IRB not to oppose Issac Butt and other moderate nationalists from creating the Home Rule League. He also actively campaigned on behalf of John Mitchel when he stood as an independent candidate at the County Tipperary by-elections in 1874 and '75.

During the 1870s IRB membership declined as the radicalism of the 1860s lay smouldering from the failed rebellion and the home rule movement gathered strength. Despite this, Doran continued to try and convince William Carroll of Clan na Gael in America to continue to send arms to Ireland. Doran also fell out with Patrick Egan and John O'Connor Power, whom he succeeded in having expelled from the Brotherhood by March 1877. However, only one year later in 1878 Doran himself would leave the brotherhood for professional reasons, with his role as secretary being taken up by John O'Connor (not to be confused with John Power).

Following his departure, Doran remained at a distance from the developments in Irish politics such as the creation of the Irish Land League or the Parnell split.

== Civilian life ==
Doran became a prominent figure in the harbour town of Cobh, becoming a member later chairman of the town commissioners (the equivalent of mayor) and also chair of Cork Harbour Commissioners. As an engineer he was responsible for the installation of the Tibbotstown Reservoir and supplying fresh water to Haulbowline and Spike islands.

Doran died in Cork city on 19 March 1909. He is buried at St. Joseph's Cemetery, Tory Top Road, Cork.
