= Portbraddon Cave =

Cave and archaeological site in Northern Ireland

- location in Northern Ireland Portbraddon Cave (the United Kingdom)
- 55°14′54″N 6°28′32″W
- Type: sea cave
- Periods: Mesolithic
- Location: Portbraddon, County Antrim
- Region: Northern Ireland

Site notes
- Excavation dates: 1930s
- Archaeologists: Andrew McLean May

Portbraddon Cave (also spelled Portbradden, Portbraddan) is a relict sea cave located near Portbraddon, County Antrim on the north coast of Northern Ireland. Its located 5 m (16 ft) above the present-day high water mark which makes it important archaeologically, as it would have been inhabited as far back as the Mesolithic.

In the 1930s the cave was the subject of an archaeological dig by Andrew McLean May, who made a number of notable finds. During the course of the excavations, which went as deep as 2 m (7 ft) below the modern floor level, May encountered: iron objects, including the barrel of a muzzle-loading pistol; pottery and flint tools, some of which showed Mesolithic characteristics; fireplaces and animal bones and ultimately the original water-worn floor of the cave. Most notably May also discovered partial remains of three human females. They were examined by Professor Thomas Walmsley at Queen's University Belfast, who noted that "most of the bones have primitive features which are not likely found together in post-medieval time; and there are some characteristics which suggest an epi-palaeolithic inheritance."

The whereabouts of the human bones have since become unknown, and they have not been subjected to modern radiocarbon dating techniques.

== See also ==
- List of caves in the United Kingdom
- List of caves in Ireland
