= Colmán of Cloyne =

Irish Catholic saint (530–606 CE)

Saint Colmán of Cloyne
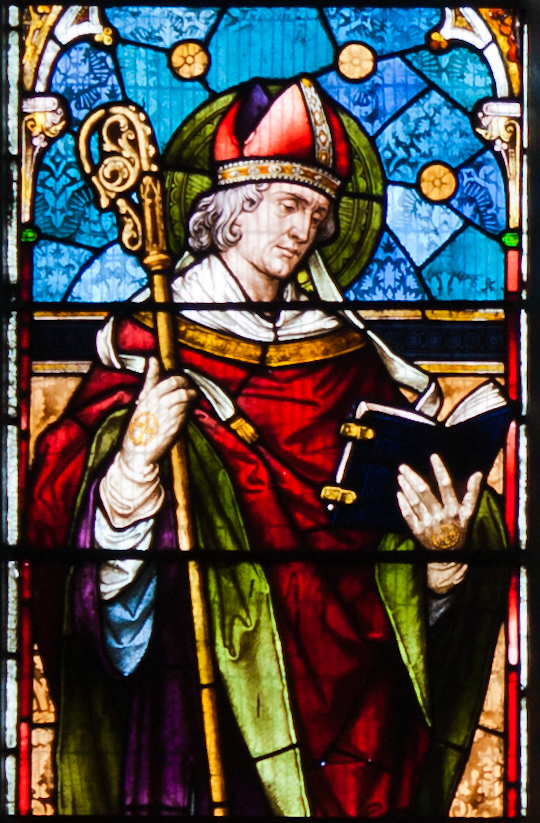
- Stained glass window of Colmán in Buttevant, created by Franz Mayer & Co. in 1886
- Born: 15 October 522; Munster
- Died: 24 November 600 (aged 78)
- Venerated in: Catholic Church; Eastern Orthodox Church
- Major shrine: Cloyne Cathedral; Cobh Cathedral
- Feast: 24 November
- Patronage: Patron Saint of the Diocese of Cloyne and of its cathedral in Cóbh.

Colmán of Cloyne (530 – 606), also Colmán mac Léníne, was a monk, founder and patron of Cluain Uama, now Cloyne, County Cork, Ireland, and one of the earliest known Irish poets to write in the vernacular.

== Sources ==
No hagiographical Life is known to have been written for Colmán, but various aspects of his life are presented in different types of sources, such as Irish annals, genealogies and martyrologies. An early origin tale known as Conall Corc and the Corco Loígde, which survives only as part of the Irish genealogical tract in MS Laud 610, includes a few brief notes on the saint. This text was probably written at Colmán's foundation of Cloyne and though it cannot be precisely dated, a rough approximate of c. 700 or earlier has been suggested.

== Background ==
Irish genealogies generally agree that Colmán had a father called Lénín. Through his father, Colmán appears to have been descended from the Rothrige, an obscure people who are known elsewhere as a subject people of the Déisi of Munster. Irish genealogies, however, go some way to associating Colmán's lineage with the Éoganachta, the leading ruling dynasty in Munster. One early item of genealogical information, which specifically identifies the Mac Léníni and Mac Duinich as sub-branches of the Rothrige (though it does not name Colmán), achieves this by making their eponymous progenitor Eochaid Rothán a son of the Éoganacht ancestor Mug Nuadat. The saint's genealogies later come to trace Colmán's ancestry to Mug Nuadat through seven generations. This prominence accorded to the Éoganachta in the genealogies is to be seen in the light of Colmán's monastic career and the position of Cloyne after his death (see below).

The text Conall Corc and the Corco Loígde includes a brief triad in which Colmán is named as one of the three "ex-laymen" (athláich) of Ireland, along with Énna of Aran and Móchammac of Inis Celtra (though it also adds a fourth, Bishop Erc in Sláne of Mag Breg). The use of the word athláech here has been taken to suggest that Colmán became a cleric at a somewhat later age than was usual at the time. Later tradition claims that it was the Connacht saint Brendan of Clonfert who finally persuaded him to do so.

== Cloyne ==
Colmán is remembered as the founder of the monastery at Cluain Uama, now Cloyne (Co. Cork, Ireland), in Munster, which lay in the kingdom of the Uí Liatháin and the Uí Meic Caille, a sept of the former. The origin legend Conall Corc and the Corco Loígde claims that the land for the foundation was not given by the local king, but by Coirpre (Crom) mac Crimthainn (d. c. 580), who was king of Munster from the Eóganacht Glendamnach:

Coirpre mac Crimthainn it was who gave Cloyne to God and to Colman mac Colcon who is also called Mac Lénéne and Aired Cechtraige and Cell Náile. Because of this they [the Eoganacht Glendamnach] are entitled to secular rule.

Aired Cechtraige has been identified as the later parish of Erry in the barony of Middlethird, and Cell Náile as that of Killenaule, in the barony of Ardagh, both in the diocese of Cashel.

The same text alludes to Colmán's conflicts with other rulers. Colmán and his brothers are said at one time to have been expelled from Maethalach by Máel Umai, the son of Coirpre's brother Fiachna Onchind; for this reason, his descendants were forever excluded from royal rule. Earlier in the text, Colmán is also said to have uttered a curse (maledictio) which brought down the walls of the city of Ress or Ressad. According to Paul MacCotter, Ress(ad) appears to be "an archaic name for Uí Chairpre or one of its divisions", the Uí Chairpre being a prominent sept of the Uí Fidgenti in County Limerick.

Cloyne appears to have been his earliest settlement. The cathedral and round tower are situated on a limestone eminence in the midst of the valley, surrounded by rich meadows. In the rock is the cave extending in various branches underground to a great distance, from which the town derives its name. Here it is supposed Colman took up his abode as a place of security and the remains of his primitive oratory, known as Colman's Chapel were still to be seen in 1813. Colmán is also believed to have founded a monastery at what would become Killagha Abbey in County Kerry.

Further details of his life are not documented in writing but the connection of many places in counties Cork and Limerick with his name to this day proves the reality of his labours. The tenth-century Triads describes Cloyne as an important law school.

== Poet ==
He was credited with extraordinary poetic powers, being styled by his contemporaries 'royal poet of Munster'. Several of his Irish poems are still extant, notably a metrical panegyric on Saint Brendan. Colgan mentions a metrical life of Saint Senan by him.

It is unclear whether he was brought up as a Christian, but what is sure is that he was educated and became a bard or file, which required a special education - (in order to reach the highest level of file 12 years of study were required.) As a member of the class of filí, he became attached to the court of Cashel where he remained until about the age of 48 years. In 570 he and Brendan of Clonfert were said to have settled a dispute between rivals to the throne of Cashel and Aodh Caomh was acknowledged as king - the first Christian king of Cashel. The king was installed by Brendan. During the time of the coronation Colman and some others discovered the lost shrine of Ailbhe of Emly. Brendan said that it was not right that the hands which had held this sacred relic should be defiled henceforth, thus it was that the son of Leinin offered himself to God. Brendan blessed him and gave him the name Colmán, which is a diminutive of Colm. The Gaelic word colm corresponds to the Latin columba (dove).

Colman then went to the school of Saint Iarlaithe of Tuam and after his studies, he is next mentioned as preaching to the heathen population in the east of County Cork. He is described as a "religious and holy presbyter, who afterwards became a famous bishop". The Prince of Déise, in the present County of Waterford, presented his child to Colman for baptism. Colman baptized him Declan and urged his parents to educate him well in his faith. This child became Declán of Ardmore.

Colman was given churches in Erry and Killenaule (4 and 10 miles from Cashel respectively) by Coirpre Cromm mac Crimthainn, King of Munster (Cashel), as well as lands in Cloyne, Co. Cork. It may well be that the lands in Cloyne (Cluain Uama, the lawn of the cave), were conquered lands and to prevent the possibility of reconquest were given to the church. The Cloyne estate was large and contained some of the best land in the area.

After the king's death (c. 580) Colman somehow became involved in factional strife between Coirpre's descendants in which some of them persecuted him while others, the ancestors of the later dominant line, protected him.

=== Extant verse ===
His surviving verses date from the period 565 and 604, and are among the earliest examples of Irish writing in the Latin alphabet. He is commonly thought to have composed Luin oc laib, a poem in praise of Domnall mac Muirchertaig (d. 566?), king of Tara and another poem on the death of Áed Sláine (d. 604), king of the UÍ Néill. The latter poem has not survived complete.

== Veneration ==
He died on 24 November (his subsequent feast day), circa 600, and his probable place of burial is Cloyne, where he may have left a school of poetry in existence. The calendars are unanimous in dating his death on 24 November, now his feast day. Patron saint of the Diocese of Cloyne and its cathedral in Cóbh.

A different Colman is also venerated on the same day, as recorded by Aengus in his "Felire": – Mac Lenine the most excellent With Colman of Duth-chuilleann. Colman lived in a time for which we have very little written history. The received picture of Colman Mac Leinin comes to us from nineteenth and twentieth-century Hagiographies.
