= John Ahern (bishop) =

Roman-catholic bishop

- Bishop of Cloyne
- Church: Catholic Church
- Diocese: Diocese of Cloyne
- In office: 30 March 1957 – 17 February 1987
- Predecessor: James Roche
- Successor: John Magee

Orders
- Ordination: 31 June 1936
- Consecration: 9 June 1957 by Albert Levame

Personal details
- Born: 31 August 1911 Leamlara (near Lisgoold), County Cork, United Kingdom of Great Britain and Ireland
- Died: 25 September 1997 (aged 86)
- Buried: St Colman's Cathedral, Cobh

John J. Ahern DCL, STL, (1911–1997) was an Irish Roman Catholic clergyman, who served as Bishop of Cloyne from 1957 until 1987.

Born in 1911, a native of Leamlara, near Lisgoold, County Cork, Ahern was ordained in 1936. He was appointed professor of canon law at Maynooth College in 1946. In 1956, he was appointed to the see of Cloyne. He was a council father at the Second Vatican Council.

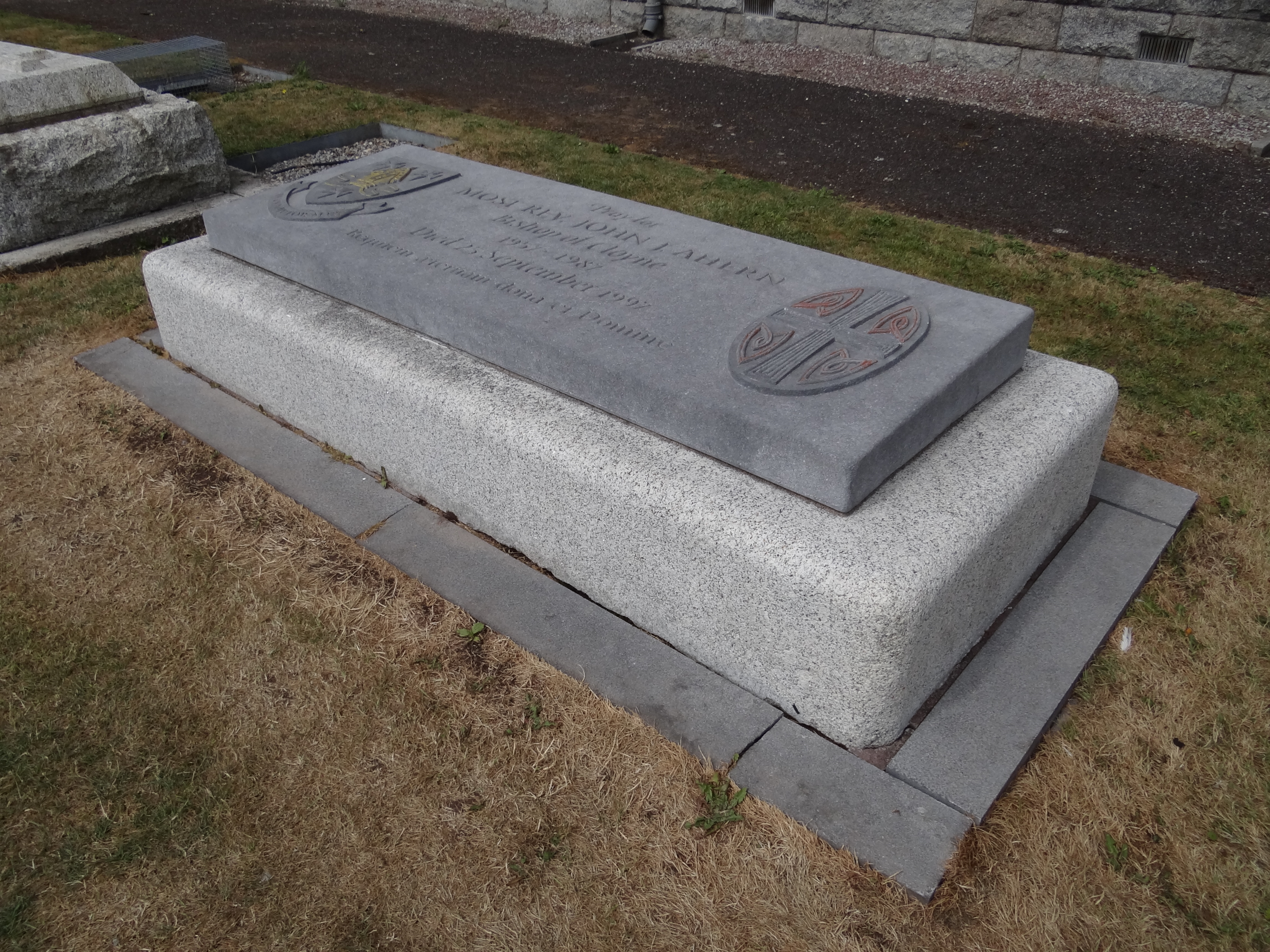
Ahern's tomb outside St Colman's Cathedral (Cobh).

Ahern retired as bishop in 1987 and died on 25 September 1997. Bishop John Magee succeeded him at Cloyne. The National School in Leamlara, which succeeded the one he attended, is named in his honour.
