= Feidlimid mac Tigernaig =

Feidlimid mac Tigernaig (died 588) was a King of Munster from the Raithlind branch of the Eoganachta. This branch of the family only rarely provided a king in Munster. He succeeded Fergus Scandal mac Crimthainn as king in 582.

A proverb stated that every descendant of Echu (his great-great grandfather) shall not go to Cashel even if he was King of Munster. This applied to Feidlimid who was barred from Cashel and instead built the fort of Bodumbir, south of the capital. He had married Cumman, the widow of Coirpre Cromm mac Crimthainn thereby claiming the throne. The kinglists of the Laud Synchronisms omit him from the list and instead substitute Feidlimid mac Coirpri Chruimm in favor of the Glendamnach branch.

== See also ==
- Kings of Munster
