= Kelly's Cave =

Limestone cave in Ireland

- Uaimh Uí Cheallaigh
- Location within Ireland
- Location: Nymphsfield, Cong, County Mayo
- OSI/OSNI grid: M 152 557
- Coordinates: 53.544443°N 9.279192°W
- Length: 16 m (52 ft)
- Discovery: prehistoric
- Geology: Carboniferous Limestone
- Entrances: 1

Kelly's Cave is a limestone solutional cave and National Monument in County Mayo, Ireland.

== Location ==
Kelly's Cave lies in woodland 500 m (1,600 ft) northeast of Cong.

== History ==
English antiquarian Wilfrid James Hemp suggested the cave may have had prehistoric use, comparing it to ancient caves in Sardinia.

It has been suggested that the cave may have been extended and modified in the middle ages for use as a hermitage related to Cong Abbey.

This cave is supposed to have taken its name from a fugitive named Kelly who took refuge there following the 1798 Rebellion.

Another local tradition claims that Kelly was a man who, along with his family, was forced to live there during the Penal era (17th–18th century). Kelly became a highwayman to survive.

== Description ==
The cave is about 16 m (52 ft) long and consists of two rectangular chambers and a hole in the roof which acts as a skylight. Four steps lead down to an underground stream, and benches have been carved into the walls.
