= Cloyne Cave =

Cave in County Cork, Ireland

- Interactive map of Cloyne Cave
- Location: Cloyne, County Cork, Ireland
- Coordinates: 51.863783°N 8.117578°W
- Length: 3.3 km (2.1 mi)
- Geology: Limestone
- Entrances: 2
- Hazards: Getting lost

Cloyne Cave is a cave located near the town of Cloyne, County Cork, Ireland. It is the longest cave in County Cork.

== Description ==
The cave has been known of for thousands of years and lends its name to the town itself. The name Cloyne is taken from Irish: Cluain Uamha meaning Cave of the meadow.

The cave largely consists of phreatic mazes formed along weaknesses in the jointing of the limestone rocks. These complex mazes result in a cave which contains several kilometres of passage yet covers a very small area: around 8 acres (32,000 m^{2}). The exact length of the cave is unknown as the cave has yet to be fully surveyed, despite several years of continuous surveying in the early 1980s by local cavers. Estimates have ranged from 2.5 km to 7 km. A further system of unexplored caves has been known to exist under the town itself, since a section of the main street collapsed into a cavern in the mid-20th century.

The cave is very difficult to explore due to the confusing nature of the mazes. People have been said to have been lost in the cave for two days.
