= Diocese of Cloyne (Catholic) =

Catholic diocese in Ireland

Coordinates: 51.8515°N 8.29356°W

Diocese of Cloyne Dioecesis Cloynensis Deoise Chluana

Catholic
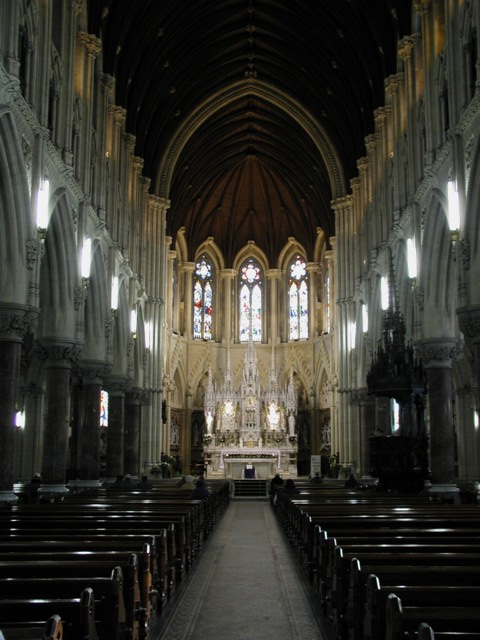
- St. Colman’s Cathedral, Cobh

Location
- Country: Ireland
- Territory: Northern and eastern parts of County Cork
- Ecclesiastical province: Province of Cashel
- Metropolitan: Archdiocese of Cashel and Emly

Statistics
- Area: 1,328 sq mi (3,440 km^{2})
- Population: 151,711

Information
- Denomination: Catholic
- Sui iuris church: Latin Church
- Rite: Roman Rite
- Established: Bishopric in 580; Diocese in 1152
- Cathedral: St Colman's Cathedral, Cobh
- Patron saint: Colman of Cloyne

Current leadership
- Pope: Leo XIV
- Bishop: William Crean
- Bishops emeritus: John Magee

Map
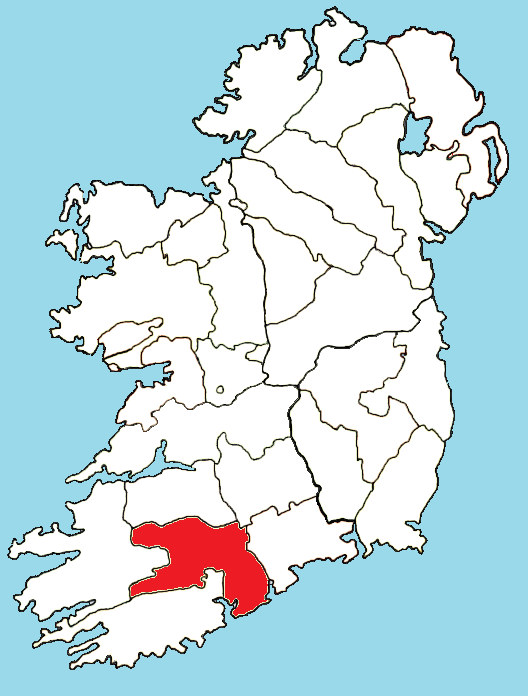

Website
- cloynediocese.ie

The Diocese of Cloyne (Irish: Deoise Chluana) is a Latin diocese of the Catholic Church in County Cork, Ireland. It is one of six suffragan dioceses in the ecclesiastical province of Cashel (also known as Munster).

== History ==
The diocese has its beginnings in the monastic settlement of Colman of Cloyne in Cloyne, east Cork. A round tower and pre-reformation cathedral still stand at this site.

The diocese was erected in 580. Colman, son of Lenin, lived from 522 to 604. He had been a poet and bard at the court of Caomh, King of Munster at Cashel. It was Brendan of Clonfert who induced Colman to become Christian. He embraced his new faith eagerly and studied at the monastery of St. Jarlath in Tuam. He later preached in east Cork and established his own monastic settlement at Cloyne about 560. His feast day is celebrated on 24 November.

Cloyne was later to become the centre of an extensive diocese in Munster. For eight centuries it was the residence of the Bishops of Cloyne and the setting for the cathedral. As the metropolitan archdiocese of Cashel was co-extensive with the over-kingdom of Munster, so many of the dioceses were co-extensive with petty kingdoms that owed their loyalty to Cashel. Fergal, Abbot-Bishop of Cloyne, was massacred in 888 by the Danes. There are seven recorded devastations of Cloyne from 822 to 1137. In 1152 at the Synod of Kells, Cloyne was made one of Cashel's twelve suffragan sees. The territories of the MacCarthy dynasty in north west Cork, together with the kingdoms of Fermoy and Imokilly, came to make up the new diocese of Cloyne. Neighbouring Lismore diocese was severely pruned at Kells. It lost all jurisdiction in present-day County Cork (excepting Kilworth parish) to Cloyne.

=== Diocese of Cloyne and Cork (1429-1747) ===
Robbery of church property by nobles impoverished the Sees of Cloyne and Cork, which were united in 1429, by papal authority, under Bishop Purcell. Blessed Thaddeus MacCarthy was bishop from 1490 to 1492. The bishops of penal times were ruthlessly persecuted, and some suffered cruel imprisonment or died in exile.

=== Diocese of Cloyne and Ross (1748-1850) ===
John O'Brien author of an Irish dictionary, poems, and tracts, was Bishop of Cloyne and Ross from 1748 to 1769. He died in exile in Lyons. Since 1769 the Bishops of Cloyne, with the exception of Dr. Timothy Murphy, resided at Cobh (formerly Queenstown) on the north side of Cork Harbour.

=== Diocese of Cloyne ===
The Dioceses of Cloyne and Ross were separated in 1850. Following the relaxation of the worst elements of the Penal laws, "...the diocese, despoiled of all its ancient churches, schools, and religious houses, had to be fully equipped anew. About 100 plain churches were erected between 1800 and 1850." Following the separation of Ross, Bishop William Keane planned a cathedral for Cobh to replace the inadequate parish Church of the time.

== Ordinaries ==
The following is a basic list of Roman Catholic bishops since 1850.

- Timothy Murphy (1850–1856)
- William Keane (1857–1874)
- John McCarthy (1874–1893)
- Robert Browne (bishop) (1894–1935)
- James Roche (1935–1956)
- John Ahern (bishop) (1957–1987)
- John Magee (1987–2010)
- William Crean (2012–present)

=== Notable clergy ===
The novelist Patrick Augustine Sheehan, better known as Canon Sheehan of Doneraile, produced a literary oeuvre of essays, short stories, poems and novels between 1881 and 1913.

Archbishop Daniel Mannix of Melbourne was born in Charleville in 1864 and ordained for the diocese of Cloyne in 1890. Nominated Professor of Moral Theology in Maynooth in 1895, he was promoted to president of St. Patrick's College, Maynooth in 1903. He served as Archbishop of Melbourne for approximately 45 years, from 1917 to 1963.

Archbishop Thomas Croke was born in 1824 at Castlecor and ordained for the diocese of Cloyne at Paris in 1824. Having been professor in the Irish College in Paris for almost twelve years, he returned to Ireland and was appointed president of St. Colman's College, Fermoy in 1858. In 1865, he became parish priest of Doneraile. Nominated Bishop of Auckland, New Zealand, in 1870, he was translated to the Archdiocese of Cashel in Ireland in 1875. He died in 1902.

Bishop Robert Browne, born in Charleville in 1844, was ordained for the diocese of Cloyne in 1869. Following a brief period as professor in St. Colman's College, Fermoy, he was appointed dean and professor of Greek at St. Patrick's College, Maynooth, in 1870. In 1885, he succeeded as president of the college. Nominated Bishop of Cloyne in 1894, his principal task was to complete the building of Cobh Cathedral which he consecrated in 1919. He died in 1935.

Bartholomew MacCarthy, Celtic scholar and editor of the Stowe Missal, was born at Conna, Ballynoe, County Cork in 1843. He was ordained in Rome in 1869. On his return to Ireland he was appointed professor of classics at St. Colman's. He went as curate to Mitchelstown and afterwards to Macroom and Youghal. In 1895 he was appointed parish priest of Inniscarra, near Cork, where he died.

=== Today ===
Bishop William Crean was appointed as bishop by Pope Benedict XVI on 24 November 2012 and installed on 27 January 2013. A number of pilgrimages are organised from the diocese each year such as the pilgrimages to Lourdes, Fatima and Knock. The diocese also runs a number of youth services and adult faith development programmes. In 2012 The Cork Scripture Group was founded to promote scripture in the diocese and offers with the neighbouring Diocese of Cork and Ross a Diocesan Certificate in Biblical Studies. As of 2016, the diocese was running courses in catechism in conjunction with the Maryvale Institute in Birmingham.

== Child sexual abuse ==
The diocese was the subject of a report, the Cloyne Report, into child sexual abuse and cover-up. According to a Health Service Executive (HSE) audit, the then Vicar General Denis O'Callaghan as the person responsible and the Diocese had put children at risk of harm through an "inability" to respond appropriately to abuse allegations and "had taken a fairly minimalistic role in terms of sharing information with the Board". The Diocese of Cloyne said it accepted the findings.

On 4 February 2010, Bishop John Magee requested Pope Benedict to relieve him of his duties, saying that he would use the time to "devote the necessary time and energy to cooperating fully with the government Commission of Inquiry into child protection practices and procedures in the diocese of Cloyne" which up to this point had been handled by Denis O'Callaghan. In accordance with canon law, an apostolic administrator was named for an open-ended interim period. Bishop Magee resigned on 24 March 2010 upon learning of the full gravity of the revelations of the report. Bishop Magee now resides in a North Cork town and is frequently invited to presided at various religious and Eucharistic celebrations overseas, particularly in Italy.

== See also ==
- Catholic Church in Ireland
- Diocese of Cork, Cloyne and Ross (Church of Ireland)
