= Cloyne Round Tower =

Round tower in County Cork, Ireland

- Cluain
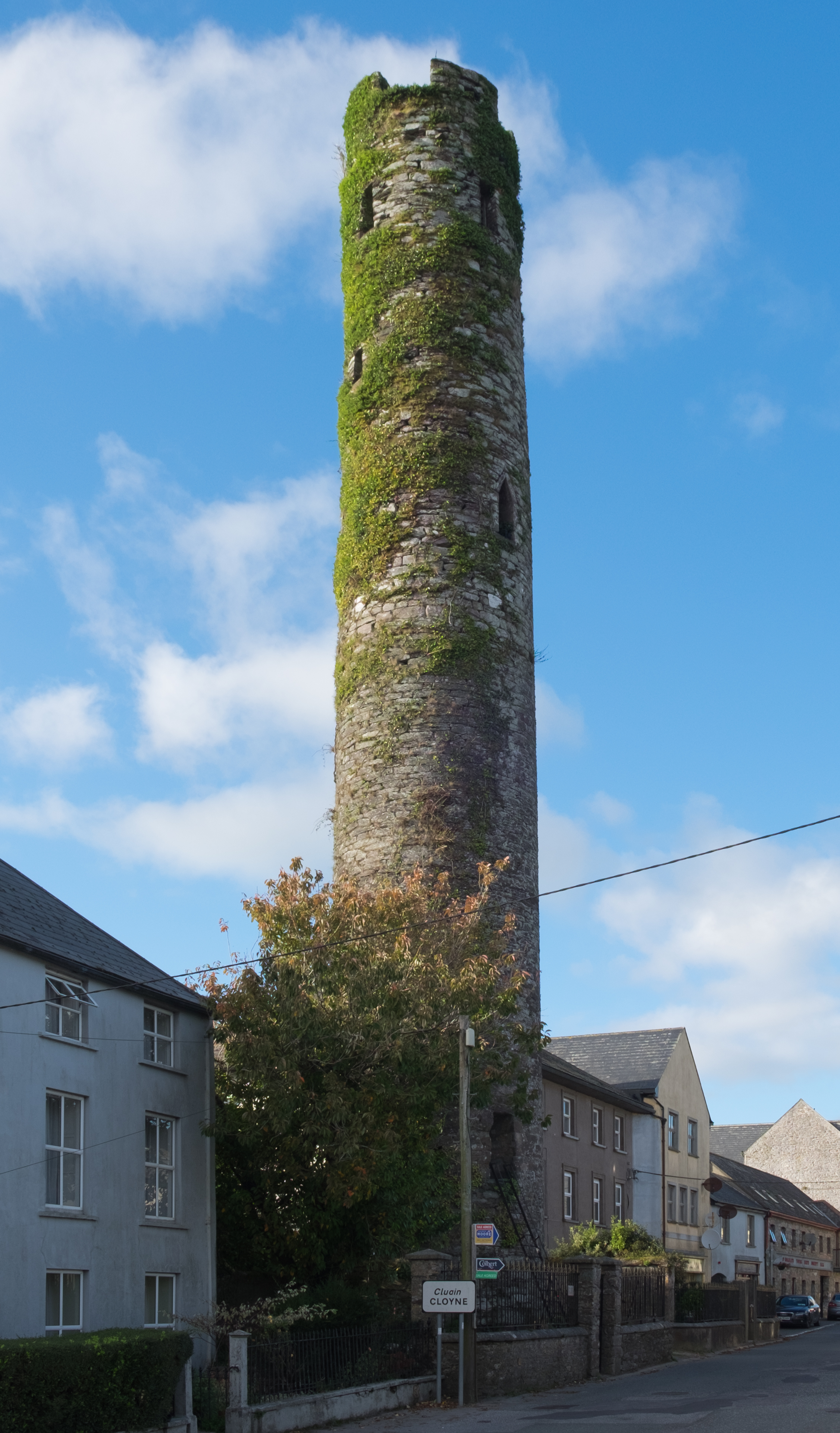
- Round tower at Cloyne

- Location within Ireland

Religion
- Affiliation: Pre-Reformation Catholic

Location
- Location: Church Street, Cloyne, County Cork, Ireland
- Interactive map of Cloyne Round Tower
- Coordinates: 51°51′43″N 8°7′13″W

Architecture
- Style: Irish round tower
- Groundbreaking: 10th century

Specifications
- Height (max): 30.5 m (100 ft)
- Materials: sandstone

Cloyne Round Tower is a round tower in the historically monastic town of Cloyne, County Cork in Ireland. Cloyne is also a "see city" of the Anglican (Church of Ireland) Diocese of Cork, Cloyne and Ross. The tower is a symbol for the town of Cloyne.

== History ==
The monastic settlement at Cloyne dates to about 560 AD, when Saint Colman of Cloyne (who died in 604) founded the original monastery. The round tower itself dates to around the 10th century, and is approximately 30m high and 16.25m around when measured about 1.5m above the ground. The stone in the tower is dark purple sandstone. As with some other round towers, a lightning strike caused some damage to the top of the tower. The strike was in 1749. There is also the ruin of a Norman watchtower on a hill overlooking the town.

The town is a religious centre and has a pre-reformation cathedral, in full use today in the Church of Ireland, as well as a more recent Catholic church. The Church of Ireland Cathedral dates to 1250 A.D. The local Catholic church, St. Colmans, was built in 1815. The round tower was used to hang the Cathedral bell in the 19th century.

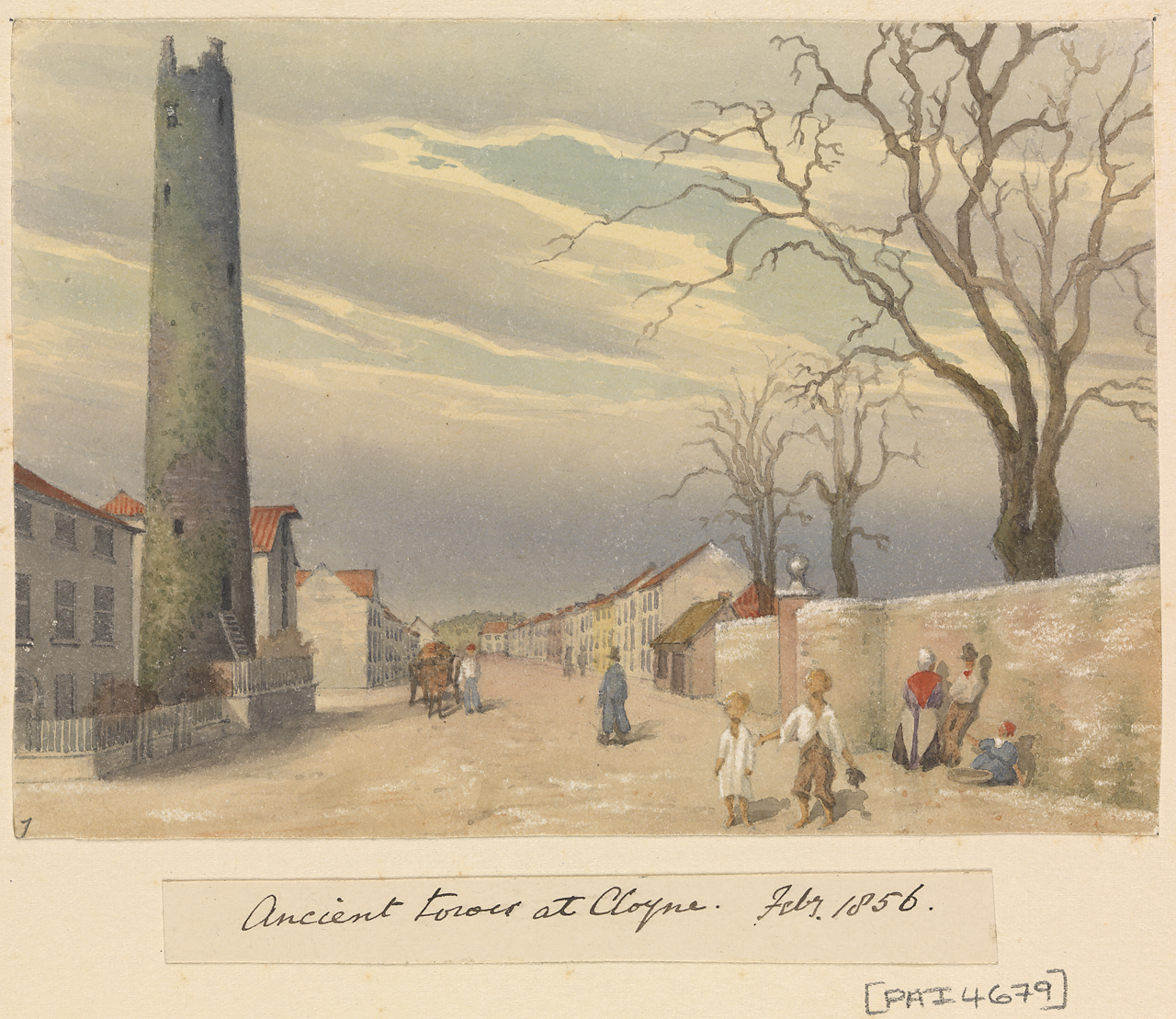
Painting of the tower by Edward Fanshawe, 1856
