= Coirpre Cromm mac Crimthainn =

Coirpre Cromm mac Crimthainn (died 577) was a King of Munster from the Eóganacht Glendamnach sept of the ruling Eoganachta dynasty. This branch was centred at Glanworth, County Cork. He was the son of Crimthann Srem mac Echado (died circa 542).

The chronology of the sixth-century kings of Munster in the sources is contradictory. The Annals of Tigernach mention him as king in 542 but then names another king in 545, Cormac mac Aillela. The annals then mention his death again at 577 after reigning 17 years. This would give a possible reign of 560–577. King lists contained in the Laud Synchronisms, the Book of Leinster and the saga Senchas Fagbála Caisil (The Story of the Finding of Cashel) also mention him.

In 572, he fought the Battle of Feimin (plain between Cashel and Clonmel, County Tipperary), and defeated Colmán Bec mac Diarmata (died 585) and many of the men of Meath were slain. A poem on the origin of the name of Loch Cenn gives the following information about this battle:

"Loch Cenn! woe to him that rows along its shore! Cairpre filled it with heads, till it is all blood beneath and above. Loch Silenn from that time forth ... did Cairpre fill, the warrior of the Cairn, so that hence comes the name of Loch Cenn."

His sons were Feidlimid mac Coirpri Chruimm, a possible king of Munster, and Áed Fland Cathrach, who was ancestor of the later kings from the Glendamnach line. He gave Cloyne to God and its first bishop was Saint Colman of Cloyne. His widow Cumman married Feidlimid mac Tigernaig, also King of Munster.

Coirpre Cromm mac Crimthainn Eóganachta
Regnal titles
Preceded by Crimthann Srem mac Echado	King of Cashel c. 542 – 577	Succeeded by Fergus Scandal mac Crimthainn and Feidlimid mac Coirpri Chruimm
