= St Colman's Cathedral, Cobh =

Catholic cathedral in Cobh, Ireland

St Colman's Cathedral
- Ardeaglais Naomh Chólmáin
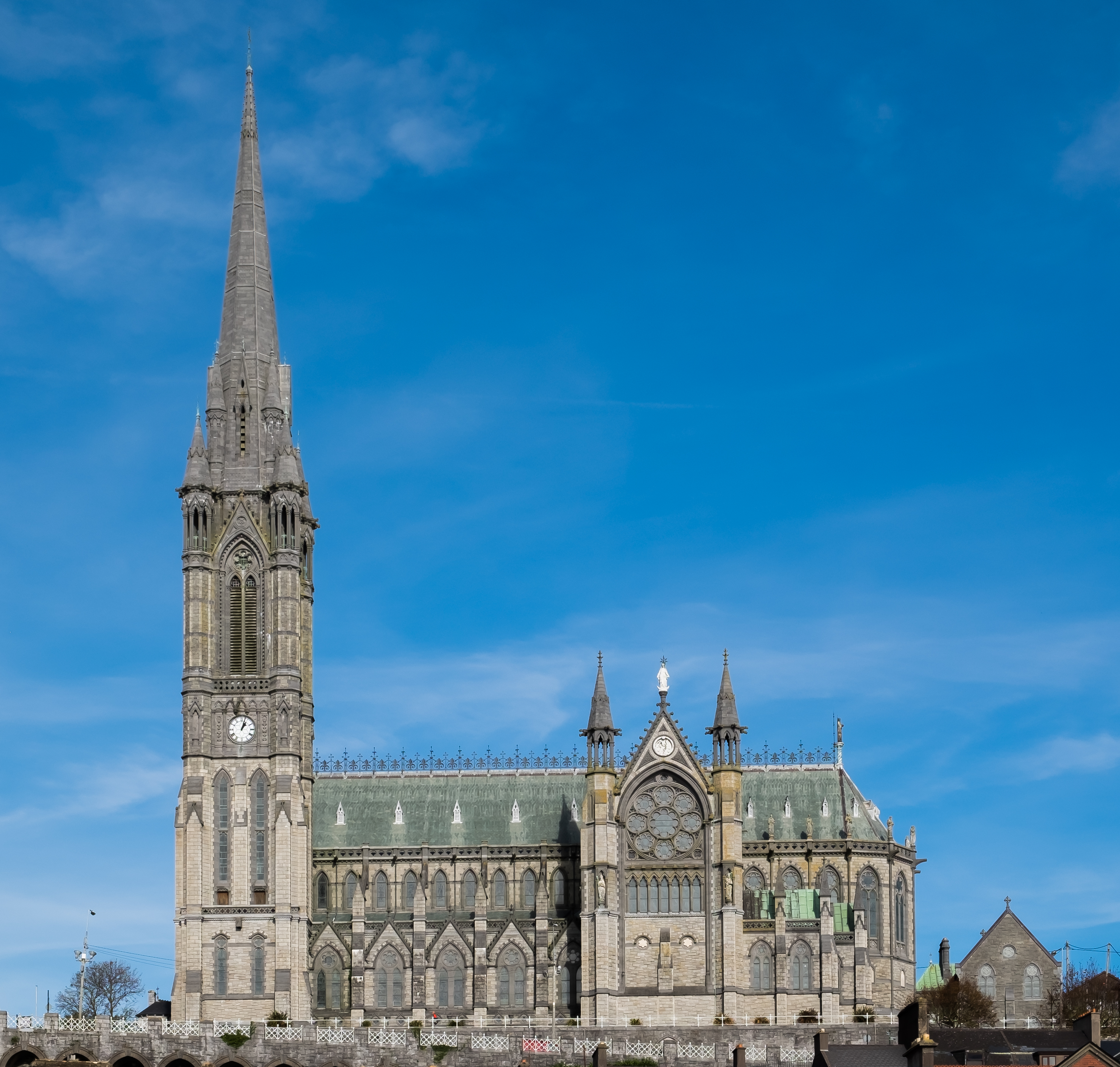
- Cathedral of St Colman
- St Colman's Cathedral
- 51°51′05″N 8°17′37″W
- Location: Cathedral Place, Cobh, P24 Y319
- Country: Ireland
- Denomination: Roman Catholic
- Website: cobhcathedralparish.ie

History
- Dedication: Colmán of Cloyne
- Consecrated: 24 August 1919

Architecture
- Architect(s): George Ashlin & Edward Pugin
- Style: Gothic Revival
- Groundbreaking: 30 September 1868
- Completed: 1919
- Construction cost: IR£235,000

Specifications
- Materials: limestone

Administration
- Province: Cashel
- Diocese: Cloyne
- Parish: Cobh Cathedral

Clergy
- Bishop: William Crean

The Cathedral Church of St. Colman (Irish: Ardeaglais Naomh Colmán), usually known as Cobh Cathedral, or previously Queenstown Cathedral, is a single-spire cathedral in Cobh, Ireland. It is a Roman Catholic cathedral and was completed in 1919. Built on Cathedral Place, it overlooks Cork harbour from a prominent position, and is dedicated to Colmán of Cloyne, patron saint of the Diocese of Cloyne. It serves as the cathedral church of the diocese.

Construction began in 1868 and was not completed until over half a century later due to increases in costs and revisions of the original plans. With the steeple being 91.4 metres tall (300 ft), the cathedral is the tallest church in Ireland. It was considered to be the second-tallest, behind St John's Cathedral in Limerick which was believed to be 94 metres tall; newer measurements have shown that the St John's spire is in fact 81 metres tall and therefore only the fourth tallest church in Ireland. It is frequently cited as one of Ireland's most beautiful church buildings.

== History ==
The Diocese of Cloyne had a pre-Reformation cathedral at the site of St. Colman's monastic settlement in Cloyne.

=== 19th century ===
A small church, known to parishioners as the "Pro-Cathedral" had been on the site of the present cathedral since 1769. On the death of Bishop Timothy Murphy in 1856, the dioceses of Cloyne and Ross were split, and Bishop William Keane decided that Cloyne should have a purpose-built cathedral.

In 1867, a diocesan building committee made the decision to erect a new cathedral in Cobh, then named Queenstown. The committee obtained designs from three firms, Edward Welby Pugin & George Ashlin, James Joseph McCarthy, and George Goldie. Goldie and McCarthy were unhappy with the conditions of the competition, which they felt to be unfair. Firstly, they felt that the cost limit of IR£25,000 may be ignored by the committee, and they also believed that Pugin and Ashlin had powerful family connections to the selection committee: the bishop was a family friend of Ashlin's, and the assistant to the building committee's administrator was his brother. As a result, Pugin & Ashlin were the only firm which accepted the conditions of the competition, and were awarded the commission. The clerk of works was Charles Guilfoyle Doran, who supervised the project until his death in 1909.

In 1867, parishioners collectively gave £10,000 towards the construction of the cathedral, and Puglin & Ashlin's draft plans were accepted in December that same year. Due to the need to level a 24-foot fall between the north and south walks, the foundations of the cathedral were costly, amounting to a total cost of £5,000.After construction of a temporary church on Bishop Street in February 1868, the old parish church was demolished. Excavation of the site began in 1868, and though the cornerstone was laid on 30 September that same year, the main contract was not let until April 1869. The total cost of the contract was given as £33,000.

After construction had begun, and the walls had reached a height of 3.5m, Bishop Keane, unsatisfied with the proposed cathedral, advised that he preferred a more elaborate design. Consequently, with the exception of the ground plan, none of the original plans were followed. Pugin & Ashlin adjusted their plans, and added flying buttresses, traceried parapets, arcading, niches, and more. These extra works increased by many thousands of cubic feet of stone the quantity already provided for and substantially increased the cost. The builder, Michael Meade, refused to renegotiate the contract and withdrew from the site. After a brief period of inactivity on the site, work resumed on the site.When Pugin died in 1875, Ashlin took on the services of a Dublin architect, Thomas Aloysius Coleman, to assist him in the completion of the project. By 1879, work had progressed sufficiently to enable the congregation to gather in the cathedral, and mass was celebrated by Bishop John McCarthy, Bishop Keane's successor, for the first time on 15 June.Works continued until 1883, at which point the builders had run out of money, at construction ceased for six years.

Construction restarted under Bishop McCarthy in 1889. The west front was finished the following year, by which point construction had already cost £100,000.

Work on the interior began in 1893, and included cladding the walls with Bath and Portland stone, and sheeting the roof with vaults of pitch pine.

=== 20th century ===
The spire was erected between 1911 and 1915, and rises to a height of 300 feet.

The building was completed in 1919 for a total cost of £235,000, far exceeding the original limit, and making it one of the most expensive churches ever built in Ireland.

The cathedral was consecrated on 24 August 1919 by the Right Reverend Robert Browne, Bishop of Cloyne, in the presence of three of Ireland's archbishops Michael Logue, John Harty and Thomas Gilmartin.

== Architecture ==
The cathedral measures 65 metres long, 37.5 metres wide, and at the highest point of the spire is 95.3 metres high.

The architectural style is Gothic Revival, modelled in particular in an elaborate French Gothic style. It is primarily constructed of blue Dalkey granite with Mallow limestone dressings. The foundation is built of a large bed of sandstone, quarried at Carrigmore and Castle Oliver. The roof is made of Belgian blue slate.

=== Exterior ===
Both the west front and the transepts hold rose windows set in high pointed arches which are flanked by octagonal turrets. Pillars on the west front are constructed from red Aberdeen granite.

The octagonal spire measures 90 metres, and is topped with a 3.3 metre bronze cross, which was blessed by Bishop Browne. The tower is made of Newry granite. The tower houses 47 bells, 42 of which were hung in 1916, and a further five in 1958. The total combined weight of the bells equal 17 tons.

=== Interior ===
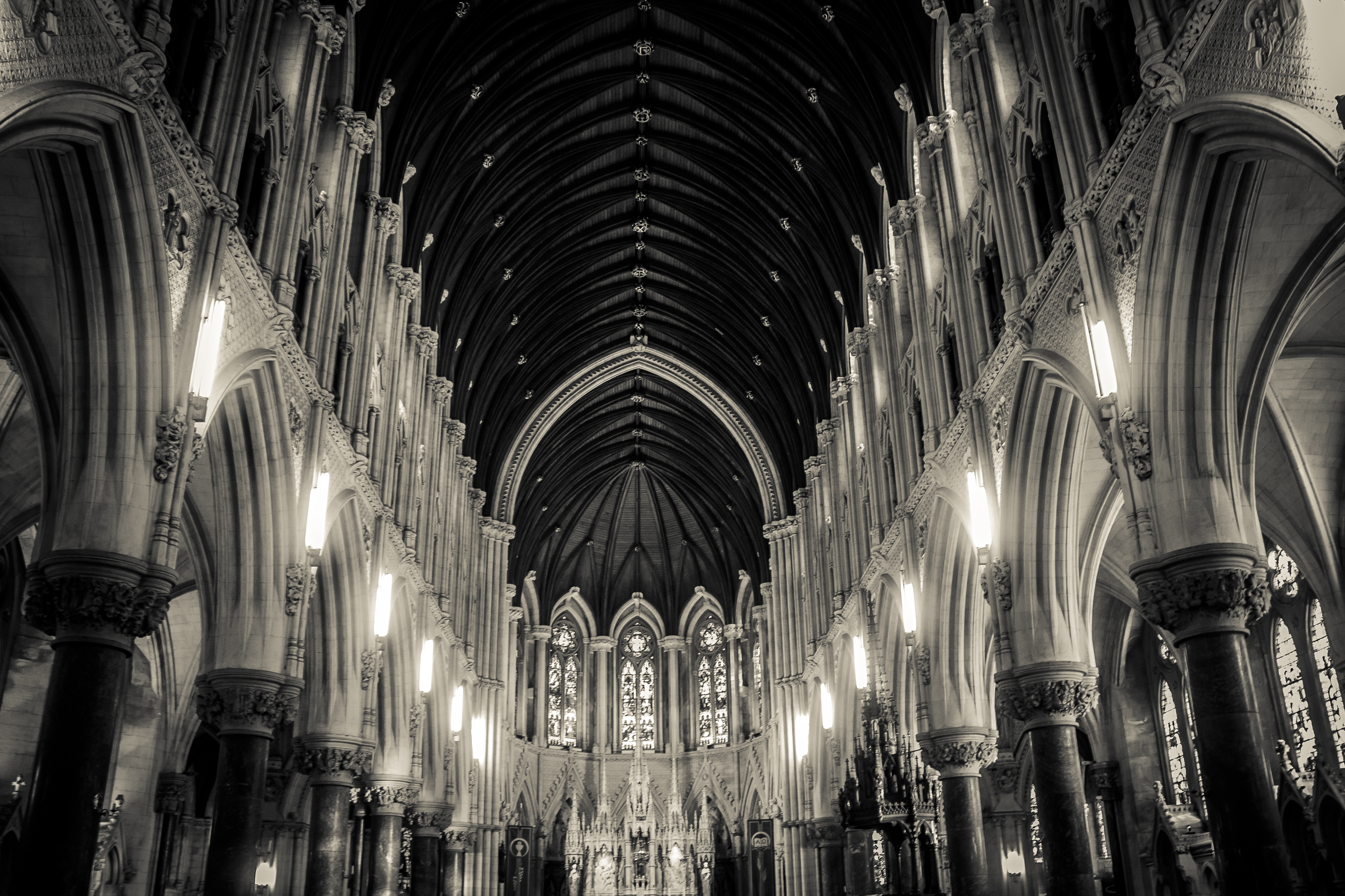
An interior view of the cathedral

The cathedral hosts an aisled nave of seven bays with triforium and clerestory, transepts with eastern chapels, an apsidal chancel, and a tower and spire at the south-west corner of the nave. Red Middleton marble is used in both the shrines and the first confessionals of both aisles; the other confessionals are of red Aberdeen granite.

== Carillon ==
The tower contains Ireland's only carillon, which with 49 bells is the most of any in the British Isles. It contains Ireland's largest bell, named St Colman, which weighs 3.6 tons. Originally installed in 1916, the carillon was restored in 1998.

An automated system strikes the hour and 15-minute intervals while it also rings the bells in appropriate form for Masses, funerals, weddings and events. The carillon is also played on special occasions and generally every Sunday afternoon by its current carillonneur Adrian Gebruers.

== Gallery ==
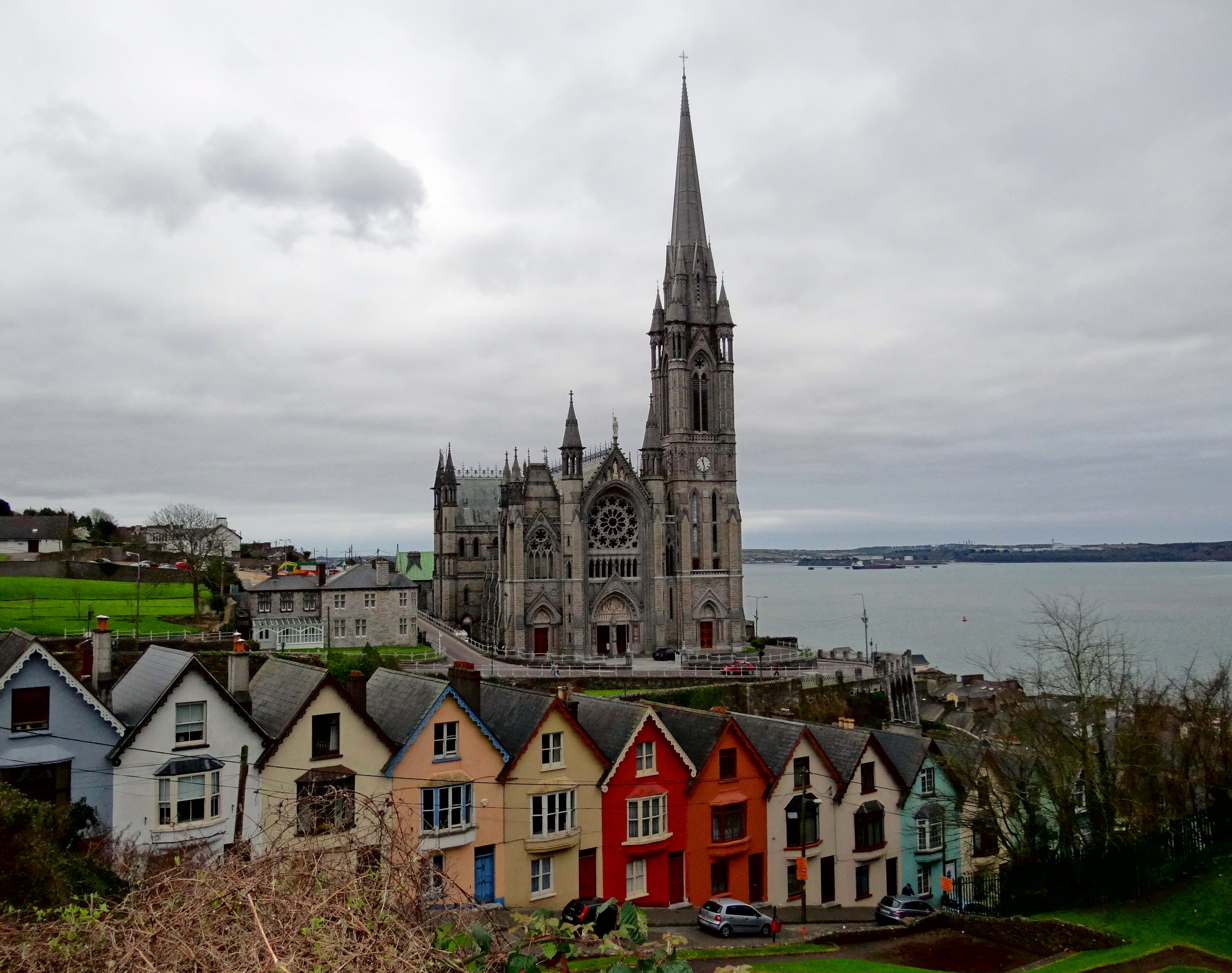
Cathedral of St. Colman

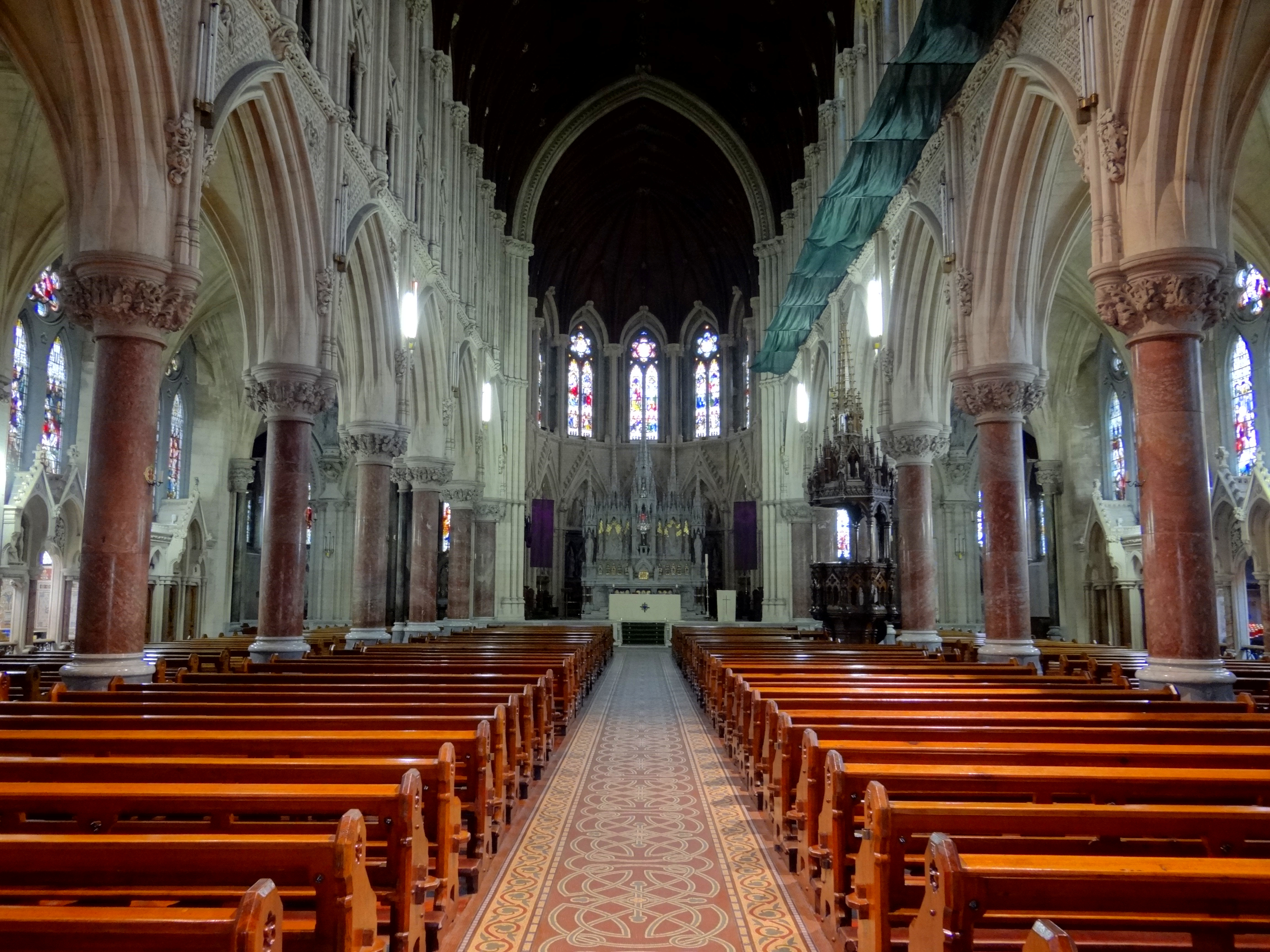
Aisle leading up to the altar

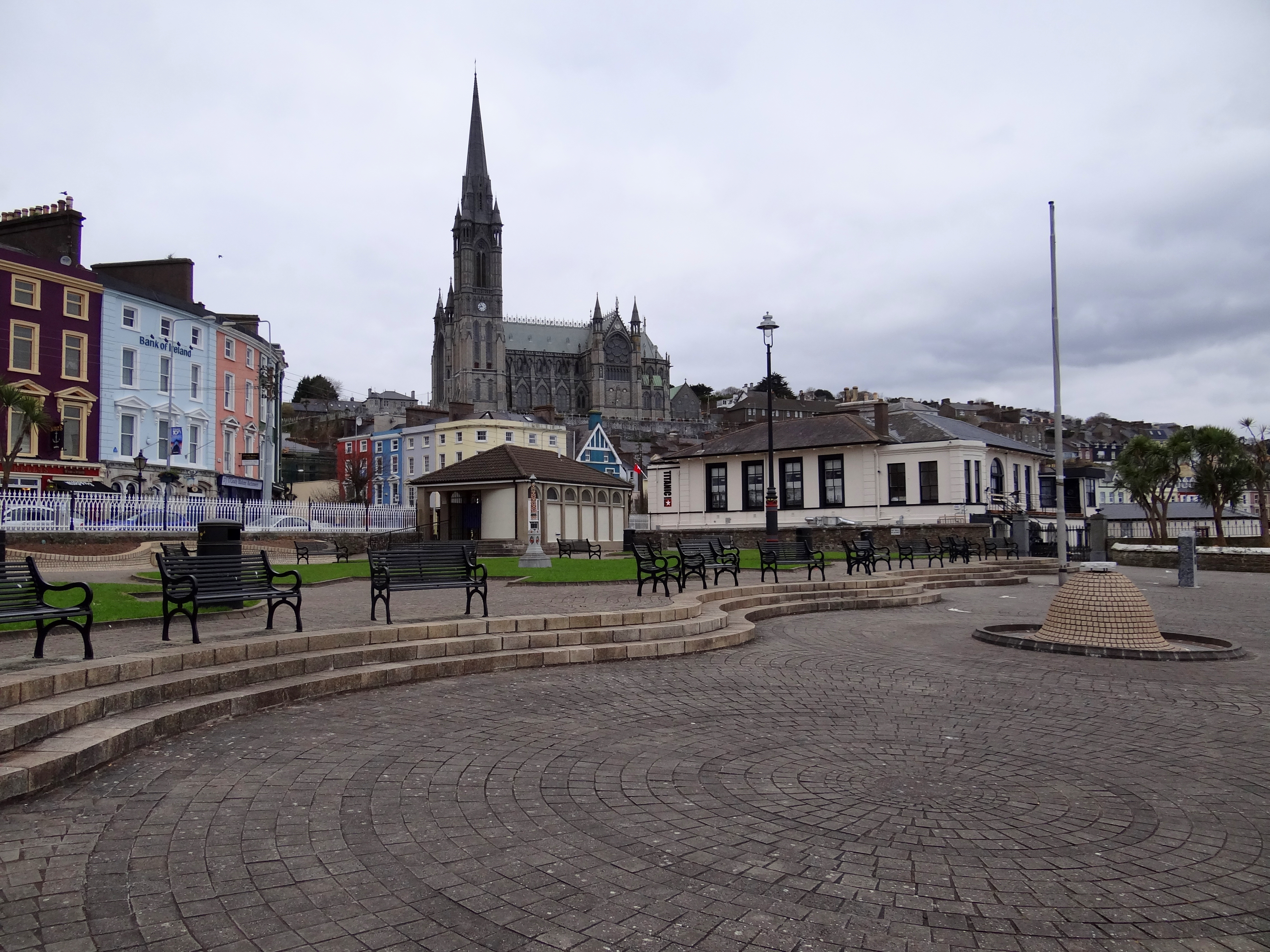
Cobh Cathedral towering above the town centre

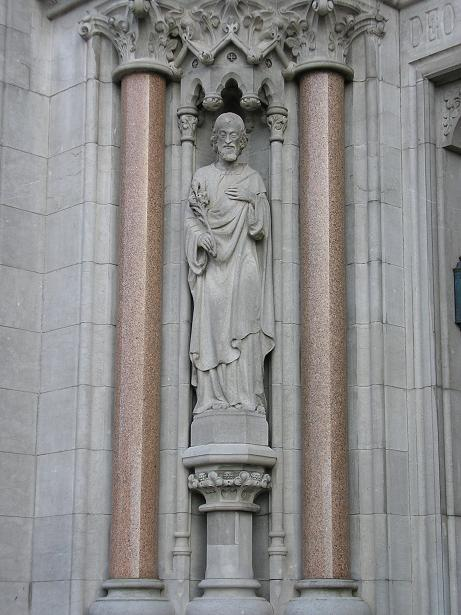
St. Joseph statue at the west door

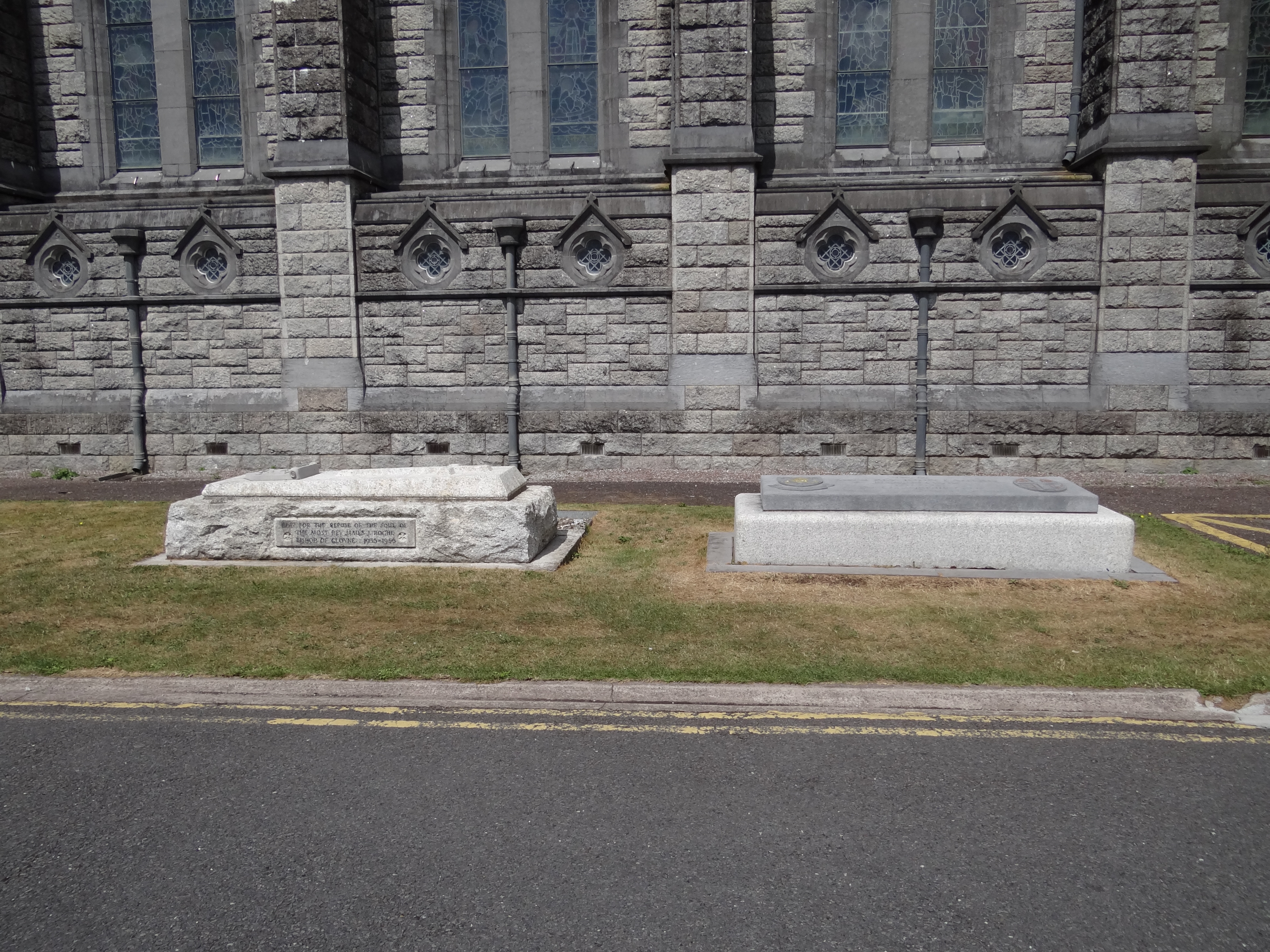
Graves of bishops James Roche (left) and John Ahern (right) outside the Cathedral

== Bibliography ==
- Patrick Thompson, Guide to St. Colman's Cathedral, Cobh, revised edition, Carraig Print, Cork.
- Jeremy Williams, A Companion Guide to Architecture in Ireland 1837-1921, Irish Academic Press' 1994.
- Paul Atterbury and Clive Wainwright, Pugin, Yale University Press 1994.
- Paul Atterbury, A.W.N. Pugin: A Master of Gothic Revival, Yale University Press 1995
- Bernard J. Canning, Bishops of Ireland 1870-1987, Donegal Democrat, 1987
