= Pierse Power =

Irish Roman Catholic prelate (1839–1891)

The Most Reverend Pierse Power
- Bishop of Waterford and Lismore
- Church: Roman Catholic
- Metropolis: Cashel and Emly
- Diocese: Waterford and Lismore
- Installed: 17 December 1887
- Term ended: 22 May 1889
- Predecessor: John Power
- Successor: John Egan
- Previous posts: Parish priest, Dungarvan

Personal details
- Born: 1827 Clonmel, Ireland
- Died: 1889 (aged 61-62) Waterford, Ireland
- Education: St John's College, Waterford; St Patrick's College, Maynooth

Pierse Power (1827 – 1889) was an Irish Roman Catholic clergyman who served as the Bishop of Waterford and Lismore from 1887 until his death.

== Life ==
Power was educated at St John's College, Waterford and St Patrick's College, Maynooth. After a curacy at Clonmel, he was on the staff of St John's from 1858 until 1879. Power was parish priest at Dungarvan from 1879 until 1886 when he was ordained Coadjutor bishop of Waterford and Lismore with the right of succession. He became bishop on 17 December 1887 and served until his death on 22 May 1889.

== Sources ==
- Moody, T. W.; Martin, F. X.; Byrne, F. J., eds. (1984). Maps, Genealogies, Lists: A Companion to Irish History, Part II. A New History of Ireland. Vol. IX. Oxford: Oxford University Press. ISBN 0-19-821745-5.

Catholic Church titles
Preceded by John Power	Bishop of Waterford and Lismore; 1887 – 1889	Succeeded by Richard Alphonsus Sheehan
