= Dominick O'Brien =

Irish Roman Catholic prelate (1798–1873)

The Most Reverend Dominick O'Brien DD
- Bishop of Waterford and Lismore
- Church: Roman Catholic
- Metropolis: Cashel and Emly
- Diocese: Waterford and Lismore
- Installed: 30 September 1855
- Term ended: 12 June 1873
- Predecessor: Nicholas Foran
- Successor: John Power
- Previous posts: Parish priest, Dungarvan

Personal details
- Education: St John's College, Waterford

Dominick O'Brien, DD (b & d Waterford 5 July 1798 - 12 JUne 1873) was an Irish Roman Catholic clergyman who served as the Bishop of Waterford and Lismore from 1887 until his death.

== Life ==
O'Brien was educated at St John's College, Waterford and Propaganda Fide. He was on the staff of St John's from 1826 until 1853, then parish priest of St Patrick, Waterford. He was ordained Bishop of Waterford and Lismore on 30 September 1855 and served until his death.

== Sources ==
- Moody, T. W.; Martin, F. X.; Byrne, F. J., eds. (1984). Maps, Genealogies, Lists: A Companion to Irish History, Part II. A New History of Ireland. Vol. IX. Oxford: Oxford University Press. ISBN 0-19-821745-5.

Catholic Church titles
Preceded by Nicholas Foran	Bishop of Waterford and Lismore; 1855 – 1873	Succeeded by John Power
