= Nicholas Walsh (bishop) =

Irish bishop

The Right Reverend Nicholas Walsh
- Born: Waterford
- Died: 14 December 1585; Kilkenny
- Occupation: Bishop of Ossory (Church of Ireland)
- Known for: Bible translation into Irish

Nicholas Walsh (died 1585) was Bishop of Ossory in the Church of Ireland, noted for having introduced prayer-books and catechisms printed in the Irish language. He began the work of translating the Bible into Irish but was not able to complete this before his murder in 1585.

The son of Patrick Walsh, Bishop of Waterford and Lismore, Nicholas Walsh was consecrated a priest in 1567. He introduced prayer-books and catechisms printed in Irish. He was appointed Chancellor of St Patrick's Cathedral, Dublin, in 1571 and Bishop of Ossory in 1578. Starting in 1573, Walsh worked on translating the New Testament into Irish. Walsh's efforts came to an end when he was stabbed to death in his house in Kilkenny by a disaffected member of his flock on 14 December 1585. He was succeeded in his translation effort by his assistant John Kearney and by Nehemiah Donnellan and William Daniel (Uilliam Ó Domhnaill), successive Archbishops of Tuam.
