= John Power (bishop) =

Irish Roman Catholic prelate (1839–1891)

The Most Reverend John Power
- Bishop of Waterford and Lismore
- Church: Roman Catholic
- Metropolis: Cashel and Emly
- Diocese: Waterford and Lismore
- Installed: 20 July 1873
- Term ended: 17 December 1887
- Predecessor: Dominick O'Brien
- Successor: Pierse Power
- Previous posts: Parish priest, Clonmel

Personal details
- Born: 1 May 1809 Affane, United Kingdom of Great Britain and Ireland
- Died: 12 June 1887 (aged 78) Waterford, United Kingdom of Great Britain and Ireland
- Education: St John's College, Waterford

John Power (1 May 1809 – 12 June 1887) was an Irish Roman Catholic clergyman who served as the Bishop of Waterford and Lismore from 1873 until his death.

== Life ==
Power was educated at St John's College, Waterford, and was ordained on 16 June 1832. He was the parish priest at Clonmel from 1866 to 1873 when he was ordained Coadjutor Bishop of Waterford and Lismore, with the right of succession. He became bishop on 20 July 1873 and served until his death.

== Sources ==
- Moody, T. W.; Martin, F. X.; Byrne, F. J., eds. (1984). Maps, Genealogies, Lists: A Companion to Irish History, Part II. A New History of Ireland. Vol. IX. Oxford: Oxford University Press. ISBN 0-19-821745-5.
