= Patrick Kelly (bishop of Waterford and Lismore) =

Irish prelate

His Excellency, The Right Reverend Patrick Kelly
- Bishop of Waterford and Lismore
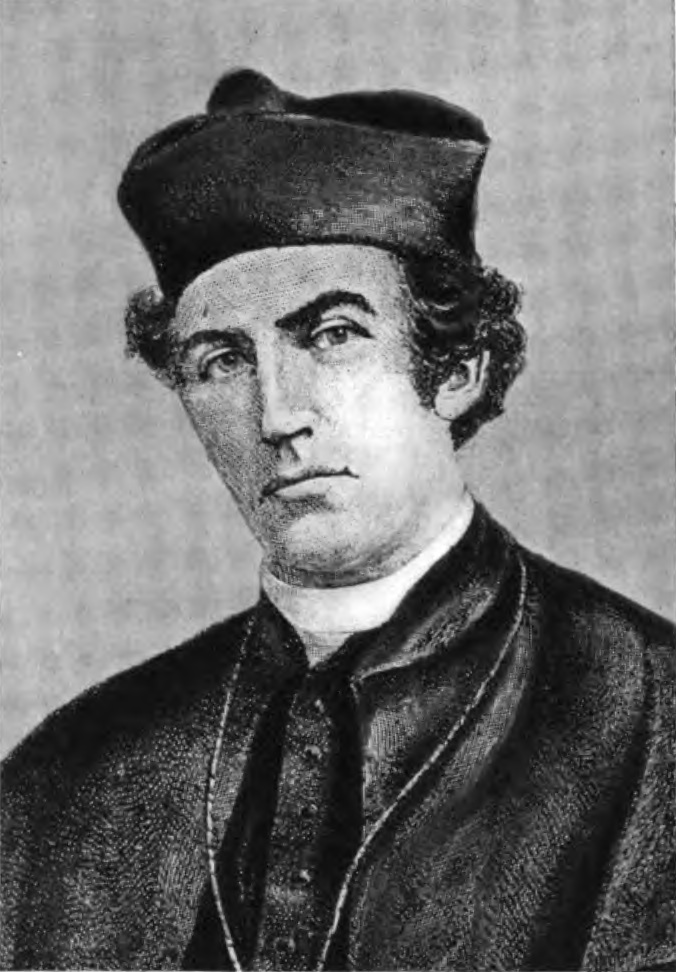
- Church: Roman Catholic Church
- Diocese: Waterford and Lismore
- In office: 9 February 1822—8 October 1829
- Predecessor: Robert Walsh
- Successor: William Abraham
- Previous post: Bishop of Richmond (1820-1822)

Orders
- Ordination: 18 July 1802 by Antônio de Pádua e Bellas
- Consecration: 24 August 1820 by John Thomas Troy

Personal details
- Born: 16 April 1779 Kilkenny, Ireland
- Died: 8 October 1829 (aged 50) Waterford, Ireland
- Denomination: Roman Catholic
- Education: Irish College at Lisbon

Patrick Kelly (16 April 1779 – 8 October 1829) was an Irish-born prelate of the Roman Catholic Church. He served as the first bishop of the Diocese of Richmond in Virginia in the United States (1820–1822) and as bishop of the Diocese of Waterford and Lismore in Ireland (1822–1829).

== Biography ==
=== Early life ===
Patrick Kelly was born in Kilkenny, Ireland on 16 April 1779 to Matthew and Anastatia Nowlan Kelly. He was sent to a classical school at Lisdowney in 1793, and to the Old Academy in 1795. In 1797, he entered the St. Patrick's College in Lisbon, Portugal.

=== Priesthood ===
Kelly was ordained to the priesthood by Bishop Antônio de Pádua e Bellas in Lisbon on 18 July 1802. For the next two years he served as professor of philosophy at St. Patrick's.

Kelly returned to Ireland on 15 August 1804. Due to poor health, he spent his first year living at home with his parents. He then served as a curate for a parish in Inistioge. In 1808 he was assigned to a parish in The Rower, a village in Kilkenny. In 1811, Kelly was appointed as a professor of philosophy at the Maudlin Street College in Kilkenny, then went in 1814 to teach at St Kieran's College at Birchfield. In August, 1815, Kelly was named as professor of theology at St. Kieran's and then president of the college in 1816. Kelly served as both president and chair of the theology department until the summer of 1820.

=== Bishop of Richmond ===
On 19 July 1820, Kelly was appointed by Pope Pius VII as the first bishop of the newly erected Diocese of Richmond in the United States. He received his episcopal consecration on 24 August 1820 at St. Mary's Church in Kilkenny from Archbishop John Thomas Troy, with Archbishop Daniel Murray and Bishop Kyran Marum serving as co-consecrators.

Kelly sailed from Dublin on 9 October 1820, and arrived in New York, after sixty days at sea, on 24 December 1820. After stopping in Philadelphia to visit Bishop Henry Conwell, Kelly then went to Baltimore, He received a cool reception there from Bishop Ambrose Maréchal, who may have been unhappy at having the Diocese of Richmond carved out of his diocese. Kelly wrote about to his brother about the meeting with Maréchal :

He did not receive me over kindly, and tried to persuade me it would be dangerous to take possession of my See; but his arguments did not satisfy me, and I arrived Norfolk on 19th January.

In January 1821, Kelly took up residence in Norfolk, Virginia, which had a larger Catholic population than the episcopal see in Richmond. While bishop, Kelly opened the first Catholic school in the diocese and engaged in missionary efforts.

=== Bishop of Waterford and Lismore ===
Kelly was soon involved in disputes with Maréchal over their jurisdictions. To end the fighting, the pope appointed Kelly as bishop of the Diocese of Waterford and Lismore in Ireland on 9 February 1822. Writing to his brother in Ireland, Kelly had these thoughts:

It does not appear to me a matter of very great importance whether I perform my pilgrimage through life on this side of the Atlantic or on yours, yet I must confess my own feelings and my knowledge of this country considered, I do give the preference to yours.

=== Death ===
Patrick Kelly died on 8 October 1829 in Ireland at age 50 of what was termed inflammation of the lungs. He is interred in the Cathedral of the Most Holy Trinity in Waterford. In July 2020, the Diocese of Richmond celebrated the bicentennial of Kelly's arrival in Norfolk.

Catholic Church titles
New title	Bishop of Richmond; 1820–1822	Succeeded by Richard Vincent Whelan
Preceded by Robert Walsh	Bishop of Waterford and Lismore; 1822–1829	Succeeded by William Abraham
