= Waterford Cathedral =

Waterford Cathedral may refer to two cathedrals in Ireland:

- Christ Church Cathedral, Waterford, a Church of Ireland cathedral
- Cathedral of the Most Holy Trinity, Waterford, a Roman Catholic Church cathedral

== See also ==
- Diocese of Cashel and Ossory in the Church of Ireland
- Roman Catholic Diocese of Waterford and Lismore
