= Diocese of Waterford and Lismore =

Diocese of Waterford and Lismore may refer to:

- The former Church of Ireland Diocese of Waterford and Lismore
- The Roman Catholic Diocese of Waterford and Lismore

== See also ==
- Bishop of Waterford and Lismore
