= Armorial of schools in the United Kingdom =

Heraldry of UK schools

The historical coat of arms or 'full heraldic achievement' for UK schools granted by the College of Arms or Lyon Court and also adopted by custom and practice, are presented herewith. For some schools, the full heraldic achievement (shield, crest, mantling and sometimes also supporters and motto) is displayed; for others just the escutcheon (shield) is shown.

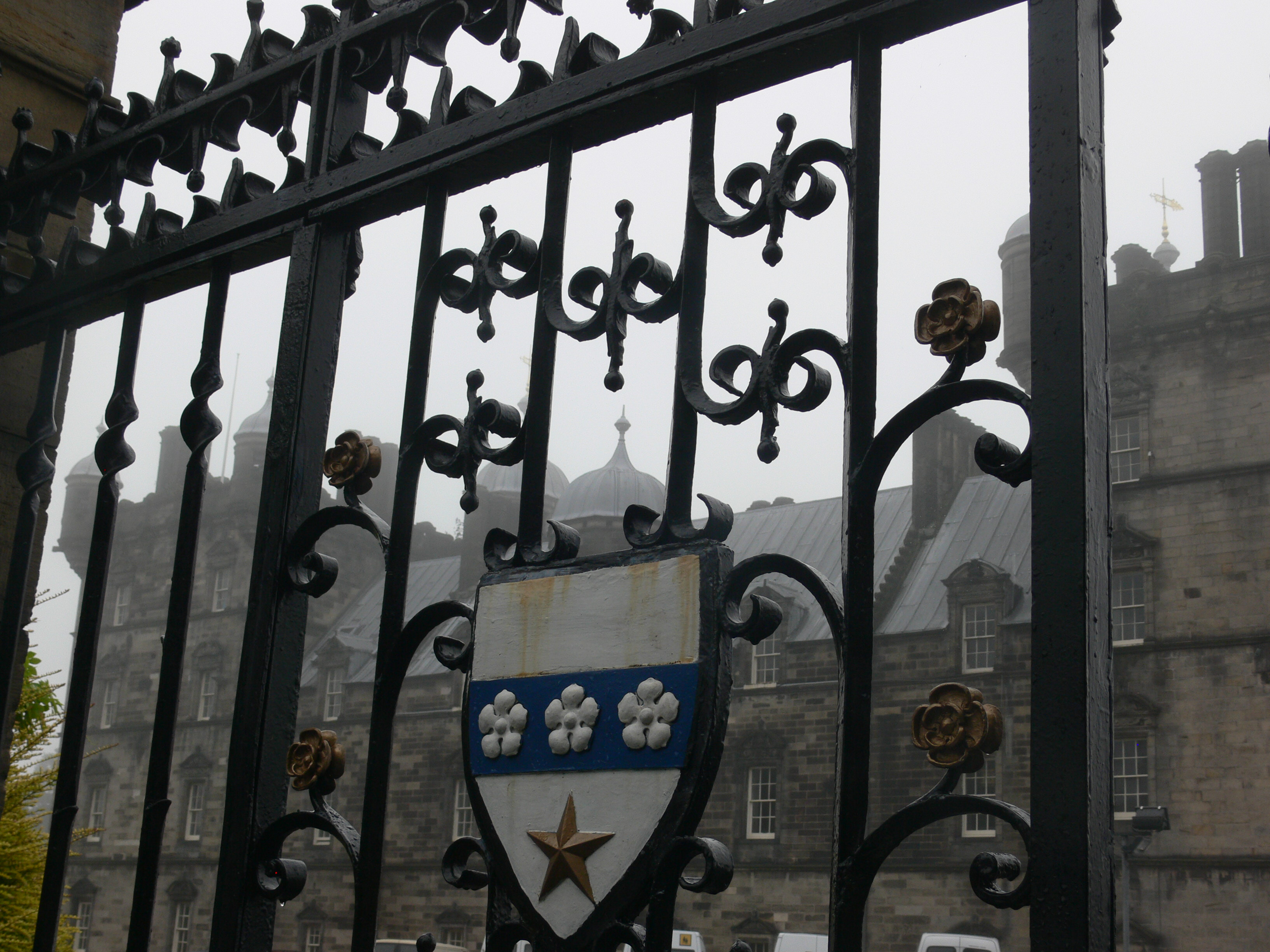
A view of George Heriot's School from Greyfriars Churchyard, showing its shield of arms on the gate.

== Schools in Northern Ireland ==
Image	Details
	Ballymena, granted 3 December 1958 Escutcheon: Argent, a humet azure between in chief two dexter hands and in base an ant gules. Crest: On a wreath argent, azure and gules, In front of a demi badger proper, an ancient lamp Or enflamed, also proper. Motto: Tenax Proposti (Firm of Purpose)
	Bangor Grammar, granted 8 July 1954 Escutcheon: Azure, within two bendlets, as many bendlets dancettee, all between two mullets Or; a bordure of the last. Crest: On a wreath of the colours, A griffin couchant, wings elevated and addorsed, Or. Motto: Justitiae Tenax (Tenacious of Justice)
	Campbell, granted 30 September 1955 Escutcheon: Gyronny of eight Or and sable, an open book proper, bound gules, edged and clasped gold; on a chief also gules a lion passant guardant of the first supporting with the dexter forepaw an ancient Irish bell argent. Crest: On a wreath argent and sable, In front of an Irish bell tower Or, a boar passant sable, armed and langued gold, charged on the body with a trefoil slipped argent. Motto: Ne Obliviscaris (Do not Forget)
	Foyle, granted 31 March 1949 Escutcheon: Quarterly argent, sable, azure and of the first, a cross quarterly gules and of the first between, in the first quarter a sword erect of the fourth, in the second quarter a tower of the first, in the third quarter a harp Or stringed of the first, and in the fourth quarter a hand appaumee couped at the wrist of the fourth. Crest: On a wreath Or and gules, A demi lion argent charged with a trefoil slipped vert and holding between the paws an open book proper, edged Or, thereon the figures 1617 gules. Motto: Ne Unquam Cesseris (Never Give Up); Note: Foyle College revised the school emblem/ 'crest' in 2011
	Glenlola Collegiate, granted 20 September 1961 Escutcheon: Azure, in base two bars wavy argent, issuant therefrom a cygnet rousant proper. Motto: Nisi Dominus Frustra (Without the Lord, everything is in vain)
	Portadown College, granted 12 March 1962 Escutcheon: Argent, in chief between two lions rampant per fess gules and azure an ancient lamp of the last enflamed gules, and in base a like lion between two lozenges also gules. Crest: On a wreath of the colours, In front of a griffin's head argent, beaked .gules, between two wings silver, three lozenges also gules. Motto: Fortiter Et Humaniter (With Courage and Courtesy)
	Portora Royal (closed 2016), granted 2 February 1954 Escutcheon: Or, on a fesse sable between in chief an open book proper, edged gules, bound and inscribed with the Roman numerals MDCVIII of the second, and in base - a castle also proper, flying therefrom a banner of St. George, a harp between two fleurs-de-lys Or. Crest: On a wreath of the colours, A stag trippant proper, collared with a chain reflexed over the back Or, supporting with the dexter foreleg a staff of the last, flying therefrom a banner sable charged with a mural crown gold. Motto: Omnes Honorate (Honour All)
	Rainey Endowed, adopted at unknown date Escutcheon: Per chevron Azure and Gules three Covered Salts Argent garnished or overflowing of the Third; Crest: On a wreath of the colours, a cubit arm erect, issuing from clouds all proper, holding a covered salt Argent, garnished Or. Supporters: Two ounces Sable, bezanty, ducally gorged and chained Or; Motto: Sal Sapit Omnia (Salt Savours All); Note: the arms are adopted from the Worshipful Company of Salters who previously were the landowners of the site occupied by the school.
	Royal Academical, granted 3 August 1951 Escutcheon: Sable, between two Doric columns Or an open book proper, edged and bound of the second and inscribed in fesse with the Roman numerals MDCCCX of the first, in chief the Crown of Hanover gold. Crest: On a wreath of the colours, A seahorse erect Or supporting a torch of the last inflamed gold Motto: Quaerere Verum (Search for the Truth)
	Royal School Armagh, adopted royal arms of founder James I Escutcheon: Quarterly, I and IV grandquarterly: 1 and 4 Azure, three fleurs-de-lis Or (for France); 2 and 3 Gules, three lions passant guardant in pale Or armed and langued Azure (for England); II Or, a lion rampant within a double tressure flory-counter-flory Gules (for Scotland); III Azure, a harp Or stringed Argent (for Ireland).
	Royal School Dungannon, adopted at unknown date Escutcheon: Gules, a castle of two towers Argent, masoned and portway open Sable; Crest: On a wreath of the colours, an Imperial Crown proper, thereon a lion statant guardant Or, imperially crowned. Supporters: On either side an eagle displayed Argent, beaked and membered Or. Motto: Perseverando (By persevering)
	Victoria, granted 27 April 1951 Escutcheon: Per pale sanguine and sable, on the dexter a harp Or and on the sinister an open book proper, edged and bound gold; a chief vair, thereon a pale azure charged with a bee argent. Motto: Honor Fidelitas Praemium (Esteem is the Reward of Virtue)

== Schools in Scotland ==
Image	Details
	Aberdeen Grammar, adopted in 1884 Escutcheon: Per pale gules, a castle triple towered; impaling gules a sword paleways proper between three padlocks argent, on a chief argent, a saltire azure charged with a book proper. Note: The arms of the school combine an element of those of the city of Aberdeen and the arms of benefactor Patrick Dun. In the chief there is the Scottish saltire and a book to represent learning. Mottos: Bon Record (Of Good Report) and Ratio Conformatioque Doctrinae (Learning shaped by method)
	Ayr Academy, granted 18 February, 1912 Escutcheon: Gules, issuing from a sea undy Argent and Azure, a castle triple-towered of the second, between the head of Saint John the Baptist in a charger on the dexter and on the sinister the Holy Lamb cross staff and banner of Saint Andrew all proper.
	Cults Academy, Aberdeen granted 18 June 18, 1966 Escutcheon: Argent, on a pale Gules two open books of the First, bindings and fore-edges Vert in chief and in base, accompanied by two sheaves each of three holly leaves of the Third, banded of the Second, in dexter and sinister chief, and surmounting in base two arrows fessways of the Second, feathered of the Third, the lower contournee, all surmounted of a fess wavy Azure, foam flecked of the First.
	Denny High, granted 22 April 1965 Escutcheon: Parted per pale, dexter, per fess Azure and Vert, between a fess enarched Argent, masoned Sable, a demi-angel issuant from the fess Proper, attired Argent, celestially crowned and wings elevated Or, and in base a pale wavy Argent charged of two pallets wavy Azure; sinister, Argent, between a roundel embattled Sable voided of the field, in the honour point and a cinquefoil Gules in base, two palm branches slipped saltirewise Vert, and in chief an open book Or, fore-edges and binding Gules. Motto: Summa Peto (Aim High)
	Dunoon Grammar, adopted at unknown date Escutcheon: Azure, a saltire argent, between an open book in chief and a lymphad in base or both Proper in dexter an anchor and in sinister a harp Motto: Disciplina, Fides, Perseverantia (Discipline, Fidelity, and Perseverance)
	The High School of Dundee, granted 21 April 1938 Escutcheon: 1st Gules, a celestial crown Or. 2nd Azure, the crosier of the Abbot of Lindores Or, surmounted of a saltire couped Argent. 3rd Azure a pot of three growing lilies Argent. 4th Or, a Doric Portico of four columns sable. Motto: Prestante Domino (With God As Our Guide)
	Eastwood High, Newton Mearns, granted 12 August 1965 Escutcheon: Per chevron Argent and Azure; on a chevron Gules, fimbriated Or, between two oak-trees eradicated Proper, fructed of the Fourth, in chief, and a cogwheel winged Argent accompanied by a sun also of the First all in base, three open books Argent, lettering, binding and edges Sable, alternately with crosses pattée also Argent; Motto: Floreat Labore (May work flourish)
	Fettes, granted 16 December 1916 Escutcheon: Or, a chevron between two mullets in chief and a cross crosslet fitched in base Gules. Crest: A bee volant Proper. Supporters: On the dexter side a lion Gules and on the sinister a stag Proper, gorged with a collar to which is affixed a chain passing between the fore legs and reflexed over the back Or. Motto: Industria (Work Hard)
	George Heriot's, Edinburgh, granted 3 January 1917 (adopted from arms of school founder) Escutcheon: Argent, on a fess Azure three cinquefoils of the field, in base a mullet Sable. Crest: A cornucopia Proper. Motto: I Distribute Chearfullie
	George Watson's, Edinburgh, arms granted to George Watson in 1739 and matriculated to the college in 1916 Escutcheon: Argent, an oak-tree acorned growing out of a mount in base proper, surmounted of a fess wavy azure charged with three bezants Crest: A flaming heart proper. Motto: Ex Corde Caritas (Love from the Heart)
	Glasgow Academy, granted at unknown date Escutcheon: The Bishop's Mitre of Saint Mungo on the upper left to represent the City of Glasgow, the Lion which represents Scotland on the upper right, the torch of learning on the lower right and three crosses of sacrifice chosen to recall "the perpetual mainspring of the school, the spirit of sacrifice and service" on the lower left. The school colours are heraldically represented originally as azure (blue) and argent (silver). Motto: Serva Fidem (Keep the Faith)
	Glasgow High, granted 9 February 1919 Escutcheon: Argent, on a mount in base an oak tree, the stem at the base surmounted of a salmon on its back with a signet ring in its mouth, on the top of the tree a redbreast and in the sinister fess point an ancient hand bell proper, on a chief Gules an open book also proper, leaved or between two wreaths of laurel Gold. Motto: Sursum Semper (Always Aim High); The book in the chief represents learning, the wreaths reward. The lower part of the arms are those of the city of Glasgow.
	Trinity, Glenalmond, granted 15 September 1898 Escutcheon: Azure, a saltire argent, between the sun in his splendour in chief and a fleur-de-lis in base and two crescents in fesse or Motto: Soirbheachadh le Gleann Anuinn (Prosperity be to Glenalmond); The saltire cross of Saint Andrew on the blue background is the national symbol of Scotland. The fleur-de-lys is the emblem of the Trinity, while the sun and crescents are taken from the arms of Lothian and Buccleuch respectively.
	Gordonstoun, granted 9 August 1957 Escutcheon: Or a Lymphad contournée ramheaded and fishtail enarched Vert biremed oars Gules and under square-sail proper upon a sea in base wavy intradented Argent and Azure. Motto: Plus Et En Vous (There is more in you)
	Grantown Grammar, adopted at unknown date Escutcheon: Gules, a fess barry wavy Argent and Azure between three antique crowns Or; Motto: Age pro viribus (Act according to your strengths)
	Hamilton Grammar, adopted at unknown date Escutcheon: Azure, three cinquefoils Or; Motto: Sola Nobilitat Virtus (Virtue Alone Ennobles)
	Huchesons' Grammar, granted 19 July 1676 Escutcheon: Argent, a fess vert, surmounted of three arrows, the middlemost palewise, the other two bendwise and bendwise sinister, points meeting in base gules; in chief a boar's head erased sable. Motto: Veritas (Truth)
	Inverness Royal, granted 24 May 1933 Escutcheon: Azure, on a saltire Argent between an Imperial Crown in chief, a cat-a-mountain sejant guardant erect in base, a dromedary's head couped in the dexter flank, and an elephant's head erased in the sinister flank, a book expanded, all proper. Crest: A helmet of befitting degree with a Mantling Azure doubled Argent, and on a Wreath of their liveries is set for Crest a torch of learning in bend proper. Motto: Labore et Vertute (Labour and Virtue)
	Keith Grammar, granted 18 January 1966 Escutcheon: Tierced in pairle reversed; 1st, per pale dexter bendy of six Or and Azure within a bordure Gules; sinister Argent, an antique crown in chief Gules and a martlet in base Azure, on a chief of the last three fleurs-de-lys Or; 2nd, Argent, a lion passant guardant Gules, imperially crowned Or; 3rd, Vert, an escallop Or; and over all upon a chief Or three open books Proper, binding and fore-edges Azure. Motto: Do Ut Dus (I give in order that you may give)
	Kirkwall Grammar, adopted at unknown date Escutcheon: Azure, a lymphad unmasted, sailing upon waves of the sea, all proper. Motto: "Si Deus Nobiscum (If God be for us)
	Leith, granted 27 February 1889 Escutcheon: Argent, in a sea proper, an ancient galley with two masts, sails furled sable, flagged gules, seated therein the Virgin Mary with the Infant Saviour in her arms and a cloud resting over their heads, all also proper Motto: Persevere
	Merchiston Castle School, granted at unknown date Escutcheon: Argent, a saltire engrailed between three roses gules and open book proper. Crest — A hand proper, holding a crescent or. Motto: Ready Ay Ready
	Musselburgh Grammar, adopted at unknown date Escutcheon: Azure, a mussel shell Proper between two anchors Argent; in chief an eagle displayed of the second between two open books also Proper. Motto: Honestas (Honesty)
	Paisley Grammar, adopted at unknown date Escutcheon: Gules, a fesse chequy azure and argent, between three cinquefoils Argent; Motto: Disce puer, aut abi (Work, boy, or get out)
	Queen Anne High, Dunfermline, granted 21 August 1965 Escutcheon: Per pale indented, dexter, Azure, upon a rock in base a tower Argent, masoned Sable, windows and port Gules, supported by two lions rampant of the Second, langued of the Fourth, all demidiated; Sinister, per fess Or and Gules, a lion passant Azure, langued Gules in chief, powdered by six hearts of the last, all in chief, and in base an open book Proper, binding and fore-edges Azure. Motto: Libertatem Per Probiatatem (Freedom by Integrity)
	Queensferry High, granted 16 February 1970 Escutcheon: Azure, a cross flory between four martlets Or, on a chief Argent three primroses Gules. Motto: Mente et Manu (With Mind and Hand)
	Robert Gordon, Aberdeen, granted in 1917 Escutcheon: Per pale, Dexter: Azure, three boars' heads couped Or, langued Gules; Sinister: Gules, a tower triple-towered Argent, masoned Sable, windows and port of the last; all within a bordure Or. Motto: Omni nunc arte magistra (Now is the time for all of your masterly skill); Note: the boars' heads represent the clan Gordon and the castle the city of Aberdeen
	Royal High, Edinburgh, granted 1920 Escutcheon: Sable, a castle triple towered and embattled argent, masoned of the first, windows and doors open gules set upon a rock proper. Motto: Musis Respublica Floret (The State Flourishes with the Muses)
	Royal School of Dunkeld, granted 27 January, 1953 Escutcheon: Motto: Procedite Honeste (Proceed with Honour)
	St George's, Edinburgh, granted 1988 Escutcheon: On a shield of oval form Argent, on a cross cotised Gules a torteau fimbriated Argent charged of the figure of St. George riding to the sinister and slaying a dragon of the First, in dexter chief a torch endlamed of the Second and in an Escrol below the same this. Motto: TROUTHE AND HONOUR, FREEDOM AND CURTEISYE
	St Joseph's Academy, Kilmarnock, granted 1949 Escutcheon: Per pale, dexter, Purpure a fess chequy Or and Vert sinister Argent a shakefork Sable on a chief Gules a book opened between two crosses flory Argent; Motto: Fidelis Justus Prudens (Faithful, Just, Wise)
	Stirling High, adopted at unknown date Escutcheon: Argent, on a mount in base the figure of Queen Margaret, richly habited and crowned, bearing in her right hand a sceptre and in her left a book, all proper, between two trees of knowledge vert, fructed or, and at her feet a wolf couchant guardant also proper, and in an escrol over the shield this Motto— " Tempori parendum". Motto: Tempori Parendum (Be Prepared for Your Time)
	Tynecastle High, granted 31 May 1966 Escutcheon: Per pale Argent and Azure, a castle of two towers flagged each with postern and window, and portcullis raised, all counterchanged, and in chief a rose also counterchanged, and in base a crescent likewise counterchanged.
	Wallace Hall, Thornhill, adopted at unknown date Escutcheon: Azure, in chief to dexter a Pegasus salient Or and to sinister a lion rampant Argent, in base three barrulets wavy of the third and Vert, all within a bordure Argent; Motto: Pro Libertate (For Liberty)

== Schools in Wales ==
Image	Detail
	Botwnnog, adopted from the arms of Henry Rowlands, Bishop of Bangor who founded the school in 1616 Escutcheon: Motto:
	Bishop Gore, Swansea, adopted from the arms of Hugh Gore who founded the school in 1682 Escutcheon: Motto: Virtue and good literature
	Christ College, Brecon, granted at unknown date Escutcheon: Argent, on a cross Azure, in chief an ancient crown Or, and in the fess point a cross patonce Sable charged with a Gothic minuscule letter "h" of the third. Crest: On a wreath of the colours [Argent and Azure], a tower Argent, masoned Sable, issuant from the battlements thereof a demi-lion rampant Gules, crowned Or, holding in the dexter paw a pastoral staff (crozier) in bend sinister of the last. Motto: Possunt Quia Posse Videntur ("They achieve because they think they can achieve")
	Cowbridge (closed 1974), adopted from the arms of benefactor Sir Leoline Jenkins Escutcheon: Three cocks a mullet for difference (also attributed: Argent three cocks gules beaked and membred Or); Crest: Motto: Vigiliis et Virtute (Vigilance and Courage)
	Dr Williams (closed 1975), Dolgellau, granted 27 October 1932 Escutcheon: Or, a pile reversed sable ensigned on the top with a fire-beacon proper; on a chief of the second three mullets of six points of the first. Motto: Ardua Semper (Always to strive)
	Friars School, Bangor, adopted from the arms of the Glyn family, namesakes of the school's founder. Escutcheon: Motto: Foedere Fraterno (On with the brotherhood)
	Llandaff Cathedral School, adopted from the diocese of Llandaff Escutcheon: Sable, two pastoral staves endorsed in saltire, the dexter Or, the sinister Argent; on a chief Azure three mitres of the second Crest:
	Llandovery, adapted from the arms of Llywelyn Escutcheon: Quarterly gules and or, in each quarter a lion passant guardant counter-changed Motto: Gwell Dysg Na Golud ([There are] no riches better than learning) Note: the arms used by the school invert the colours of the arms of Llywelyn
	Monmouth, granted 8 November 1570 to the Worshipful Company of Haberdashers who founded the school Escutcheon: Barry nebuly of six argent and azure, on a bend gules a lion passant [guardant] Or. Crest: On a wreath of the colours. Issuing from clouds two naked arms embowed holding a laurel wreath, all proper Supporters: On either side a goat of India argent. flecked gules, membered Or. Motto: Serve and obey
	Ruthin (closed 2026), adopted from arms of Gabriel Goodman who refounded the school in 1574 Escutcheon: Crest: Motto: Dei Gratia Sum Quod Sum (By the Grace of God I am What I am)
	Rydal School, (merged), Colwyn Bay, granted 9 January 1933 Escutcheon: Ermine, two dolphins naiant in pale Or; on a chief azure an open book proper garnished gules, clasped Or, between two lions sejant respectant of the second Motto: Prodesse quam conspici (Do good without display); Note: The school is now merged with others forming a school named Rydal Penrhos

== See also ==
- Armorial of British universities
- Armorial of county councils of England
