= Daniel Cohalan =

Daniel Cohalan may refer to:

- Daniel Cohalan (bishop of Cork) (1858–1952), Irish Roman Catholic bishop
- Daniel Cohalan (bishop of Waterford and Lismore) (1884–1965), Irish Roman Catholic bishop
- Daniel F. Cohalan (1865–1946), Irish-American leader and judge of the Supreme Court of New York State.
