= Bernard Hackett (bishop) =

Irish Roman Catholic prelate (1863–1932)

The Most Reverend Bernard Hackett CSSR
- Bishop of Waterford and Lismore
- Church: Roman Catholic
- Metropolis: Cashel and Emly
- Diocese: Waterford and Lismore
- Appointed: 29 January 1916
- Installed: 19 March 1916
- Term ended: 1 June 1932
- Predecessor: Richard Alphonsus Sheehan
- Successor: Jeremiah Kinane
- Other posts: Rector, Redemptorist College at Marianella, Rathgar
- Previous posts: Rector, Redemptorist College at Mount St Alphonsus, Limerick

Orders
- Ordination: 24 June 1888

Personal details
- Born: 24 May 1863 Dungarvan, County Waterford, Ireland
- Died: 1 June 1932 (aged 69) Waterford, County Waterford, Ireland
- Education: Mount Melleray Seminary; St John's College, Waterford; St Patrick's College, Maynooth

Bernard Hackett CSSR (b Dungarvan 24 May 1863; d Waterford 1 June 1932) was an Irish Roman Catholic clergyman who served as the Bishop of Waterford and Lismore from 1916 until his death.

== Life ==
Hackett was educated at Mount Melleray Seminary; St John's College, Waterford; and St Patrick's College, Maynooth. He was on the staff of St John's from 1890 until 1904. He joined the Redemptorists in 1904 and took his vows on 8 September 1905. He served as Rector in Rathgar; and then Limerick. Hackett was ordained Bishop of Waterford and Lismore on 19 March 1916, and served until his death.

== Sources ==
- Moody, T. W.; Martin, F. X.; Byrne, F. J., eds. (1984). Maps, Genealogies, Lists: A Companion to Irish History, Part II. A New History of Ireland. Vol. IX. Oxford: Oxford University Press. ISBN 0-19-821745-5.

Catholic Church titles
Preceded by Richard Alphonsus Sheehan	Bishop of Waterford and Lismore; 1916 – 1932	Succeeded by Jeremiah Kinane
