= Hugh Gore =

Hugh Gore may refer to:

- Hugh Gore (cricketer)
- Hugh Gore (bishop)
