= William Lee (bishop, born 1941) =

Irish Roman Catholic prelate (1941–2024)

The Most Reverend, Dr. William Lee DCL DD
- Bishop of Waterford and Lismore
- Church: Roman Catholic
- Metropolis: Cashel and Emly
- Diocese: Waterford and Lismore
- Appointed: 27 May 1993
- Installed: 25 July 1993
- Term ended: 1 October 2013
- Predecessor: Michael Russell
- Successor: Alphonsus Cullinan
- Other post: President of Accord
- Previous posts: President, Bursar and Professor at St Patrick's College, Thurles; Director of the Catholic Marriage Advisory Council of the Archdiocese of Cashel-Emly

Orders
- Ordination: 19 June 1966
- Consecration: 25 July 1993 by Michael Russell

Personal details
- Born: 2 December 1941 Newport, County Tipperary, Ireland
- Died: 5 January 2024 (aged 82) Dungarvan, County Waterford, Ireland
- Parents: John and Delia Lee
- Education: Pontifical Gregorian University; St Patrick's College, Maynooth
- Motto: Manete in dilectione mea (Remain in my love)

Styles of William Lee
- Reference style: The Most Reverend
- Spoken style: Your Grace
- Religious style: Bishop

William Lee (2 December 1941 – 5 January 2024) was an Irish Roman Catholic prelate who served as Bishop of Waterford and Lismore between 1993 and 2013.

== Early life and education ==
William Lee was born in Newport, County Tipperary on 2 December 1941, the eldest of five children to John and Delia Lee. He attended primary school at the Convent of Mercy Boys' National School and secondary school at Rockwell College.

Lee studied for the priesthood at St Patrick's College, Maynooth. He was subsequently ordained a priest for the Archdiocese of Cashel-Emly on 19 June 1966.

== Presbyteral ministry ==
Following ordination, Lee returned to St Patrick's College, Maynooth, where he completed a doctorate in canon law in 1969. He subsequently received his first pastoral assignment, as curate in Finglas West parish, Dublin, before moving to Rome in 1971 to complete further studies in canon law at the Pontifical Gregorian University.

Lee returned to Ireland in 1972, where he was appointed professor of philosophy and bursar at St Patrick's College, Thurles, and subsequently as its president between 1987 and 1993. He also served as director of the Catholic Marriage Advisory Council (later Accord) for the Archdiocese of Cashel-Emly, and subsequently on the Cork Regional Marriage Tribunal.

== Episcopal ministry ==
Lee was appointed Bishop-elect of Waterford and Lismore by Pope John Paul II on 27 May 1993. He was consecrated on 25 July by his predecessor, Michael Russell, in the Cathedral of the Most Holy Trinity, Waterford.

Lee was appointed episcopal secretary of the Irish Catholic Bishops' Conference in 1998. He also served on the Commission for Clergy, Seminaries and Vocations, the Commission for the Laity and the Bishops' Department of Planning and Communications of the Irish Catholic Bishops' Conference, as well as President of Accord.

Following the establishment of a website providing information and assistance to people who wished to formally defect from the Catholic Church in the aftermath of the publication of the final report of the Commission to Inquire into Child Abuse on 20 May 2009, Lee told the Irish Examiner on 16 July that there were no records of defections from his diocese, and that he wasn’t aware of any defections personally.

Following his participation in a meeting between Irish bishops, Pope Benedict XVI and senior members of the Roman Curia from 15 to 16 February 2010 to discuss the publication of the Ryan and Murphy reports in 2009, Lee told The Munster Express that Pope Benedict XVI had described child sexual abuse as "a heinous crime and a grave sin that offended God".

It was reported on 25 March 2010 that he had waited two years in the 1990s before informing Gardaí about complaints made by two people in connection to allegations of child abuse by a priest in the Diocese of Waterford and Lismore. In a statement, Lee apologised for mishandling the allegations, but did not give any further explanation as to why he had taken so long to report the matter.

== Retirement and death ==
It was announced on 1 October 2013 that Lee had tendered his episcopal resignation on medical grounds to Pope Francis some weeks previously, and that it had been accepted with immediate effect.

Lee died on the morning of 5 January 2024 in Dungarvan Community Hospital, County Waterford, aged 82.

His funeral Mass took place on 9 January in the Cathedral of the Most Holy Trinity, Waterford, with burial afterwards in the cathedral grounds.

Catholic Church titles
Preceded by Michael Russell	Bishop of Waterford and Lismore; 1993–2013	Succeeded by Alphonsus Cullinan
