= Daniel Cohalan (bishop of Waterford and Lismore) =

Irish bishop (1884–1965)

- Bishop of Waterford and Lismore
- Church: Catholic Church
- Diocese: Diocese of Waterford and Lismore
- In office: 30 January 1943 – 27 January 1965
- Predecessor: Jeremiah Kinane
- Successor: Michael Russell

Orders
- Ordination: 9 June 1906
- Consecration: 4 April 1943 by Daniel Cohalan (B. of Cork)

Personal details
- Born: 28 January 1884 Kilmichael, County Cork, United Kingdom of Great Britain and Ireland
- Died: 27 January 1965 (aged 80) Waterford, County Waterford, Ireland

The Most Reverend Daniel Cohalan (1884–1965) was an Irish Roman Catholic clergyman who served as Bishop of Waterford and Lismore from 1943 to 1965.

== Early life and education ==
He was born in Kilmichael in County Cork, Ireland on 28 January 1884. His uncle of the same name, Daniel Cohalan, was Bishop of Cork from 1916 to 1952. He was educated at the Presentation Brothers College, Cork and proceeded to Rome. After graduating at the Pontifical Irish College in Rome, Italy, he was ordained to the priesthood at the Basilica of St. John Lateran, Rome, on 9 June 1906. He continued his post-graduate studies in Rome from 1906 to 1910 where he earned a Ph.D. in Canon and Civil Law. He returned to Ireland and became Dean of Residence at University College Cork from 1910 to 22 July 1922.

== Priestly ministry ==
His first pastoral appointment was a curate at St. Patrick's Church, Lower Glanmire Road in Cork City from 22 July 1922 to 3 February 1929. Followed by as the Administrator of the Cathedral of St Mary and St Anne in Cork from 3 February 1929 to 26 April 1937. Whilst there, he was also appointed a Canon of the Cathedral chapter on 25 September 1930. His second pastoral appointment was as Priest in Charge of the Lough Parish in Cork City from 26 April 1937 to 3 February 1943.

== Episcopal ministry ==
He was appointed Bishop of Waterford and Lismore by the Holy See on 30 January 1943 and consecrated on 4 April 1943, the principal consecrator being his uncle with whom he shared the same name and who was then Bishop of Cork. He took an interest in Irish emigrants to Britain and was also very interested in the Pioneer Total Abstinence Association.

He died in office at the Bishop's House, John's Hill in Waterford, Ireland, on 27 January 1965, aged 81 years old, and buried at the Cathedral of the Most Holy Trinity, Waterford.

Catholic Church titles
Preceded by Jeremiah Kinane	Bishop of Waterford and Lismore; 1943–1965	Succeeded by Michael Russell
