= Bernard Hackett =

Bernard Hackett may refer to:

- Bernard Hackett (footballer)
- Bernard Hackett (bishop)
