= Alphonsus Cullinan =

Irish Roman Catholic prelate

The Most Reverend, Dr. Alphonsus Cullinan SThD
- Bishop of Waterford and Lismore
- Church: Roman Catholic
- Diocese: Waterford and Lismore
- Appointed: 2 February 2015
- Installed: 12 April 2015
- Predecessor: William Lee
- Previous posts: Parish priest of Rathkeale; Chaplain at Limerick Institute of Technology and Limerick Regional Hospital

Orders
- Ordination: 12 June 1994 by Jeremiah Newman
- Consecration: 12 April 2015 by William Lee

Personal details
- Born: 7 May 1959 (age 67) Lahinch, County Clare, Ireland
- Residence: The Bishop's Palace, Waterford
- Parents: Christy and Rita Cullinan
- Education: Pontifical Lateran University; St Patrick's College, Maynooth
- Motto: Deus atque audacia (God and daring)
- Coat of arms

Alphonsus "Phonsie" Cullinan (born 7 May 1959) is an Irish Roman Catholic prelate who has served as Bishop of Waterford and Lismore since 2015.

For six hours on Ash Wednesday 2025, Bishop Alphonsus Cullinan stood on the streets of Waterford City distributing ashes to thousands.

== Early life and education ==
Cullinan was born in Lahinch, County Clare on 7 May 1959, one of ten children to Christy and Rita Cullinan. He moved with his family to Limerick, where he attended the Salesian Primary and John F. Kennedy National Schools, and secondary school at Crescent College Comprehensive.

Cullinan studied primary teaching at Mary Immaculate College, completing a Bachelor of Education in 1981. His first teaching appointment was in Castleconnell, where he taught for six years, during which time he also worked part-time for the Bunratty Castle Entertainers, before moving to Spain, where he taught English for two years in Colegio Peñalba in Valladolid.

Cullinan began studying for the priesthood at St Patrick's College, Maynooth in 1989, completing a two-year course in philosophy before completing further studies in theology. As a student, he occasionally visited events in Dublin organised by Opus Dei and the Priestly Society of the Holy Cross.

Cullinan was ordained a priest for the Diocese of Limerick on 12 June 1994.

== Presbyteral ministry ==
Following ordination, Cullinan completed a Licentiate of Sacred Theology in St Patrick's College, Maynooth, before returning to the Diocese of Limerick in 1995, where he was appointed curate in St Munchin's parish, Limerick. The following year, he was appointed chaplain to the local regional hospital.

Upon completion of doctoral studies in moral theology, with a focus on moral utilitarianism, Cullinan was awarded a Doctorate of Sacred Theology from the Alphonsianum in Rome, Italy, in 2004. He returned to the Diocese of Limerick in 2004, where he was appointed chaplain to the local institute of technology.

Cullinan was subsequently appointed parish priest in Rathkeale in 2011.

== Episcopal ministry ==
Cullinan was appointed Bishop-elect of Waterford and Lismore by Pope Francis on 2 February 2015.

He was consecrated by his predecessor, William Lee, on 12 April in the Cathedral of the Most Holy Trinity, Waterford.

=== Controversies ===
==== Same-sex marriage ====
In his first pastoral letter to the Diocese of Waterford and Lismore in May 2015, Cullinan questioned whether a Yes vote in a referendum on permitting same-sex marriage was "pandering to the desires of adults over the rights of children", emphasising that "children are different to adults just as the union of a man and a woman is different to any kind of relationship between two men or two women".

==== HPV vaccination ====
Cullinan caused controversy in September 2017 over comments he made on the HPV vaccination programme in Irish schools, which led to criticism from a number of sources, including the then-Minister for Health, Simon Harris. He subsequently apologised if his remarks were misinterpreted outside of their respective context.

==== Abortion ====
Cullinan made headlines on 31 October 2017, over comments he made referring to abortion as "not a medical treatment".

Speaking on Déise Today on WLR FM on 2 February 2018, he claimed that contraception was "morally wrong" and had promoted promiscuity in Ireland. He added that abortion was not the answer for women suffering from suicidal ideation whose pregnancies have been as a result of rape. Such claims were rejected by the chairperson of the Oireachtas committee on abortion, Catherine Noone.

Following the passing of a referendum on liberalising abortion laws on 25 May 2018, Cullinan stated on Déise Today on WLR FM on 1 June 2018 that Catholics who voted Yes in the referendum must acknowledge that they have sinned and repent before receiving Communion, and that by legislating for abortion access, Ireland "had effectively accepted euthanasia".

==== Exorcism ====
Speaking on Déise Today on WLR FM on 9 October 2018, Cullinan supported comments made by Pope Francis saying that the devil was responsible for the sexual abuse crisis in the Catholic Church, and announced plans to establish an exorcism ministry in the diocese to deal with evil spirits. Such claims were subsequently condemned by political leaders.

==== Yoga and mindfulness ====
In a letter sent to Catholic primary schools in the diocese on 10 October 2019, Cullinan stated that yoga and mindfulness were "not Christian" and unsuitable for practice during periods of religious education. Such claims were disputed by a number of sources, including former President of Ireland, Mary McAleese.

== Bibliography ==
- Cullinan, Alphonsus (2004). The Church and utilitarianism: a criticism of the utilitarianism of Peter Singer in the light of the Catholic anthropology of Karol Wojtyła (Thesis). Academia Alphonsiana. OCLC 954837867.
