= Hugh Gore (bishop) =

Hugh Gore DD (1613-1691) was a seventeenth century Anglican Bishop of Waterford and Lismore in Ireland who founded Swansea Grammar School.

He was born in Maiden Newton in Dorset, England in 1613. He want to school in Lismore, and studied at Trinity College, Oxford and at Trinity College, Dublin.

On becoming a priest he held livings in Nicholaston and Oxwich near Swansea, Wales. He was ejected from his livings in 1650 under the Propagation Act of the Commonwealth for delinquency and refusing the engagement, after which he kept a school in Swansea.

After the Restoration of King Charles II he returned to favour and became Dean of Lismore in 1664; and Bishop of Waterford and Lismore in 1666. He founded Swansea Grammar School in 1682, which is now named Bishop Gore School in his honour. He retired to Swansea in 1689. He died in 1691 and was buried at St Mary's Church, Swansea.

Church of Ireland titles
Preceded by Richard Underwood	Dean of Lismore; 1664–1666	Succeeded by Richard Lingard
Preceded by George Baker	Bishop of Waterford and Lismore; 1666–1691	Succeeded by Nathaniel Foy
