= William Byrne (priest) =

Irish priest and educator

William Byrne was an Irish priest and educator.

Byrne was born in Knocklofty, County Tipperary. He was a student at Clonmel High School and later entered St. John's College, Waterford to begin his ecclesiastical studies. He was ordained at Maynooth College and following three years as Professor at All Hallows College, Dublin, he returned to St John's Seminary where succeeding Dr. Whelan he became President serving for ten years, and ministered in the Diocese of Waterford and Lismore. During the first World War, Byrne edited of The Catholic Record of the Diocese of Waterford and Lismore and under his editorship the circulation of the Record reached the figure of six thousand copies a month.

In 1930 he was made parish priest of Ballybricken parish, the largest in the diocese. He was later created Archdeacon and finally a Domestic Prelate. He was Vicar Capitular of the diocese in the interim between the death of Bishop Hackett and the elevation of Dr. Kinane as bishop. He was awarded the title of Canon and subsequently Monsignor. He was noted for preaching against communism, speaking out against infiltration of workers groups in waterford by Socialists and Communists in the 1930s and around the time of the Spanish civil war. In 1936, Byrne was transferred to St. Peter and St. Paul's, Clonmel.
