= Risteard De Hindeberg =

Risteard De Hindeberg (Richard Henebry) was an Irish priest, educator, Irish language activist, musician, collector, and author.

He was born on 18 September 1863 in Mount Bolton, Portlaw, to an Irish-speaking family. He was educated for the priesthood in St. John's College, Waterford and in St. Patrick's College, Maynooth. He was ordained a priest at All Hallows College, Dublin, in 1892, and worked in Salford in Manchester. He pursued further studies in Germany at the universities of Greifswald and Freiburg, where he was awarded a Doctorate in Philosophy.

In 1898, he was appointed to the post of Chair of Irish of Celtic Studies at the Catholic University of America in Washington, D.C.; the Chair had been funded by the Ancient Order of Hibernians. He held that post for a short time before moving to Berkeley University in California. He became President of the Gaelic League of America. Henebry suffered from tuberculosis for his entire adult life, and partially because of this he returned to Ireland in 1903 and taught for a time in St. John's College. Following the establishment of the new National University of Ireland in 1908, he was appointed the first professor of Irish in University College Cork.

He helped set up the Irish Language College in the Ring Gaeltacht in 1909. He made many recordings on wax cylinders of Irish music.

He died near Portlaw on 17 March 1916, and was buried at Carrickbeg, County Waterford.

== Publications ==
- A Contribution to the Phonology of Desi-Irish by Rev. Richard Henebry, 1898.
- Henebry’s Irish Music and Earlier Studies, Revd Dr Richard Henebry/ Risteard De Hindeberg, 1903.
- A Handbook of Traditional Music, Rev. Dr. Richard Henebry, 1928.
