= John Egan (bishop) =

Irish Roman Catholic prelate (1839–1891)

The Most Reverend John Egan
- Bishop of Waterford and Lismore
- Church: Roman Catholic
- Metropolis: Cashel and Emly
- Diocese: Waterford and Lismore
- Installed: 19 January 1890
- Term ended: 10 June 1891
- Predecessor: Piers Power
- Successor: Richard Alphonsus Sheehan

Personal details
- Born: 19 January 1839 Roscrea, County Tipperary, Ireland
- Died: 10 June 1891 (aged 52) Waterford, County Waterford, Ireland
- Education: St Flannan's College, Ennis; St Patrick's College, Maynooth

John Egan (b Roscrea 19 January 1839; d Waterford 10 June 1891) was an Irish Roman Catholic clergyman who served as the Bishop of Waterford and Lismore from 1889 until his death.

== Life ==
Egan was educated at St Flannan's College, Ennis and St Patrick's College, Maynooth. After a curacy at Tulla, he was on the staff of St Flannan's from 1866 until 1889. Egan was ordained Bishop of Waterford and Lismore on 19 January 1890, and served until his death.

== Sources ==
- Moody, T. W.; Martin, F. X.; Byrne, F. J., eds. (1984). Maps, Genealogies, Lists: A Companion to Irish History, Part II. A New History of Ireland. Vol. IX. Oxford: Oxford University Press. ISBN 0-19-821745-5.

Catholic Church titles
Preceded by Piers Power	Bishop of Waterford and Lismore; 1889 – 1891	Succeeded by Richard Alphonsus Sheehan
