= Michael O'Hickey =

Irish Catholic priest

Father Michael O'Hickey
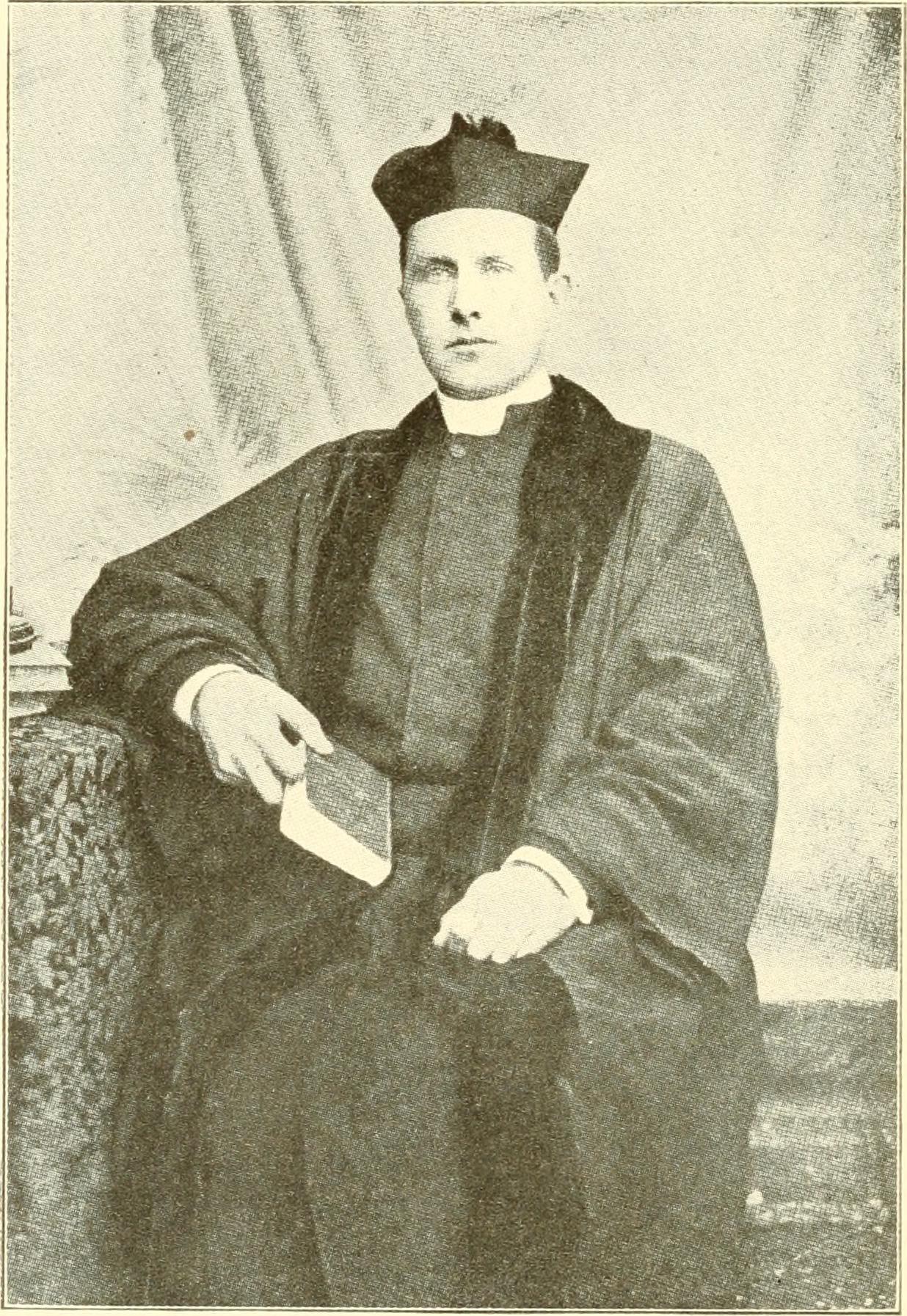
- Fr. Michael O'Hickey about 1904.
- Church: Roman Catholic

Orders
- Ordination: 1884

Personal details
- Born: Michael Patrick O'Hickey; 12 March 1860 Carrickbeg, Carrick, County Waterford, Ireland
- Died: 19 November 1916 (aged 56) Portlaw, County Waterford, Ireland
- Buried: Carrickbeg, County Waterford, Ireland
- Denomination: Roman Catholic
- Occupation: Priest; Lecturer/ Professor
- Education: St. John's College, Waterford

Michael Patrick O'Hickey (Irish: Micheál Pádraig Ó hIcí; 12 March 1860 – 19 November 1916) was an Irish Catholic priest and held the chair of Irish at Maynooth College and an Irish language campaigner.

== Biography ==
Michael O'Hickey was born in Carrickbeg, County Waterford, Ireland. His mother died at an early age and his father, a Fenian, remarried. He had an older brother Martin, and a younger half brother Maurice. He studied for the priesthood in St. John's College, Waterford, and was ordained a priest in 1884. He was an active member and vice president of the Gaelic League and studied under the noted Irish scholar Sean Plemion. O'Hickey was also a member of the Royal Irish Academy.

In 1896 he was appointed Professor of Irish in Maynooth College, succeeding Fr. Eugene O'Growney.

After clashing with the bishops and establishment, O'Hickey was dismissed in 1909 from his position as Professor of Irish, for his conduct in the controversy over Irish as a matriculation subject for the new National University of Ireland.

He received support from many Irish Nationalists (including Patrick Pearse whom he earlier had disagreements with), Irish language activists, and some of his colleagues including Maynooth's Theology Professor, Walter McDonald.

He appealed his dismissal to the Vatican, but his appeal was refused.

Sometimes his name appears as Michael Hickey rather than Micheal O'Hickey, or even in Irish as An tAthair Micheál Ó hIcí.

He died in Portlaw in 1916 and is buried in the Hickey family plot in the Friary Cemetery in Carrick Beg, County Waterford.

== Publications ==
- Irish in the schools, by Ó hIcí, Micheál P., Gaelic League, 1900.
- The nationalisation of Irish education by Rev. M.P. O'Hickey, Gaelic League, 1902.
- An Irish university, or else by Michael P. O'Hickey, Gill & Sons, Dublin, 1909.
- Language and Nationality by O'Hickey, Rev. Michael.(Preface by Douglas Hyde) Waterford News, 1918.
