= Richard Alphonsus Sheehan =

Irish priest and historian

- Bishop of Waterford and Lismore
- Church: Catholic Church
- Diocese: Diocese of Waterford and Lismore
- In office: 15 January 1892 – 14 October 1915
- Predecessor: John Egan
- Successor: Bernard Hackett

Orders
- Ordination: 2 August 1868
- Consecration: 31 January 1892 by Thomas Croke

Personal details
- Born: 16 June 1845 Bantry, County Cork, United Kingdom of Great Britain and Ireland
- Died: 14 October 1915 (aged 70)

Richard Alphonsus Sheehan (born 16 June 1845 – 14 October 1915)was an Irish priest and historian who served as Roman Catholic Bishop of Waterford and Lismore from 1892 until his death in 1915.

Sheehan was born in Bantry Co. Cork, on June 16, 1845. He was educated at Bandon national school and St Vincent's, Cork. He entered Maynooth College in 1860 and was ordained in 1868 for the diocese of Cork.

Sheehan served as president of the Cork Historical and Archaeological Society, since its foundation in 1891 until 1893.

Sheehan was appointed Bishop of Waterford and Lismore on 15 January 1892 and consecrated on 31 January 1892.

Sheehan died on 14 October 1915.

Catholic Church titles
Preceded by John Egan	Bishop of Waterford and Lismore; 1892–1915	Succeeded by Bernard Hackett CSsR
