= Michael Russell (bishop of Waterford and Lismore) =

Irish Catholic bishop

- Bishop of Waterford and Lismore
- Church: Catholic Church
- Diocese: Diocese of Waterford and Lismore
- In office: 8 November 1965 – 27 May 1993
- Predecessor: Daniel Cohalan
- Successor: William Lee

Orders
- Ordination: 17 June 1945
- Consecration: 19 December 1965 by William Conway

Personal details
- Born: 10 December 1920 Loughmoe, County Tipperary, United Kingdom of Great Britain and Ireland
- Died: 12 January 2009 (aged 88)

Styles of Michael Russell
- Reference style: The Most Reverend
- Spoken style: Your Grace
- Religious style: Bishop
- Posthumous style: none

Michael Russell (10 December 1920 – 12 January 2009) was the Roman Catholic Bishop of Waterford and Lismore in Ireland from 1965 to 1993.

== Education and Ordination ==
Born in Loughmore, Thurles, Co Tipperary, in 1920, Russell was educated at the Christian Brothers School in Thurles, and played minor hurling for Tipperary.

He was sent to study for the priesthood at St Patrick's College, Maynooth and was ordained there on 17 June 1945 for service in the Roman Catholic Archdiocese of Cashel and Emly. He began postgraduate studies and, in 1948, was awarded a doctorate in Canon Law. In the summer he was appointed to the staff of St. Patrick's College, Thurles where he lectured where he lectured in moral theology. He became vice-president in 1959.

== Episcopal ministry ==
His appointment as Bishop of Waterford and Lismore was announced by Pope Paul VI on 8 November 1965 in succession to Bishop Daniel Cohalan (bishop of Waterford and Lismore). Even though Russell was not yet ordained a bishop, he attended the final session of the Second Vatican Council and received episcopal ordination in the Cathedral of the Most Holy Trinity, Waterford, on 19 December 1965. He took as his episcopal motto 'Humilitate et Lenitate' (humility and gentleness.)

In 1984 the highlight of the trip to Ireland by President Ronald Reagan was a visit to his ancestral home village of Ballyporeen in Russell's Waterford diocese. He, along with every other Catholic bishop invited to similar events, refused to attend and gave no explanation.

At his death he was reported to have been the last surviving Irish bishop who had taken part in the Second Vatican Council. The same obituary recalled his episcopal ministry in Waterford "He oversaw the building of many new churches in the expanding suburbs of Waterford city particularly.....he was very committed to the active, social care of his flock, particularly where new community centres and the elderly were concerned. He was also a great supporter the credit unions."
