= Patrick Walsh (bishop of Waterford and Lismore) =

Irish prelate

Styles of Patrick Walsh
- Reference style: The Most Reverend
- Spoken style: My Lord
- Religious style: Bishop

Patrick Walsh (died 1578) was an Irish prelate who served as the Bishop of Waterford and Lismore from 1551 to 1578.

A graduate of Brasenose College, Oxford, he was appointed the Dean of Waterford on 9 March 1547. Four years later, Walsh was nominated the Bishop of Waterford and Lismore by King Edward VI on 9 June 1551 and was consecrated by royal mandate on 23 October 1551. He retained the deanery of Waterford until he resigned it on 15 June 1566. After the accession of Queen Mary I, Walsh was recognized bishop by the Holy See in 1555/1556. But following the accession of Queen Elizabeth I, Walsh supported the crown's reformation legislation in the 1560 Irish Parliament. In a letter of 12 October 1561, the papal legate Fr David Wolfe SJ described all the bishops in Munster as 'adherents of the Queen'. Bishop Walsh was appointed to an ecclesiastical commission for enforcing the royal supremacy in June 1564. Described as a 'crypto-catholic' in 1577, Walsh had custody of the papal Bishop of Cork and Cloyne, Edmund Tanner, who described him as 'the heretical bishop of Waterford'; and persuaded him to make a 'strictly private' rejection of the Protestant faith.

Bishop Walsh died in 1578, and was described as a 'confirmed heretic' by the Franciscan Thomas Strange.

== Notes ==
Religious titles
Preceded by Nicholas Comyn (Church of Ireland)	Bishop of Waterford and Lismore; 1551–1578	Succeeded by Marmaduke Middleton (Church of Ireland)
Preceded by John Magrath (Roman Catholic)	Bishop of Waterford and Lismore; 1551–1578	Succeeded by John White (vicar apostolic) (Roman Catholic)
