= George Baker (bishop) =

Irish Anglican bishop (17th century)

George Baker was Bishop of Waterford and Lismore in the Church of Ireland from 1661 until 1665.
