= Nathaniel Foy =

Irish bishop

Nathaniel Foy, D.D. (1648 – 31 December 1707), was a bishop of Waterford and Lismore who belonged to a new generation of reformers of the established church along with William King and Narcissus Marsh. He had defended the established church during the reign of James II when most bishops had fled the country.

Nathaniel Foy was the son of John Foy, M.D. He was born at York, and educated at Trinity College, Dublin, of which he later became a senior fellow. He was ordained a priest in 1670, and in the same year was installed as a canon of Kildare. On 20 December 1678 he was appointed minister of the parish of St. Bride, Dublin.

In the reign of James II he stood up boldly in defence of the established church when most bishops had fled the country. Crowds assembled at St. Bride's on alternate Sundays to hear his replies to the sermons delivered at Christ Church on the preceding Sundays by a doctor of the Sorbonne in the presence of the King. He accomplished this by means of abstracts of his antagonists' arguments supplied to him by gentlemen who wrote shorthand. He was prevented from preaching on several occasions by the menaces of some of the king's guard, and his firmness in supporting the Protestant faith led to his being imprisoned, together with Dr. King and other clergymen.

After the battle of the Boyne his constancy was rewarded by William II, who promoted him to the united sees of Waterford and Lismore by letters patent 13 July 1691. In September 1695 he was imprisoned in Dublin Castle for three days by order of the House of Lords, for having reportedly spoken disrespectfully of that assembly in a protest against the rejection of a bill for union and division of parishes.

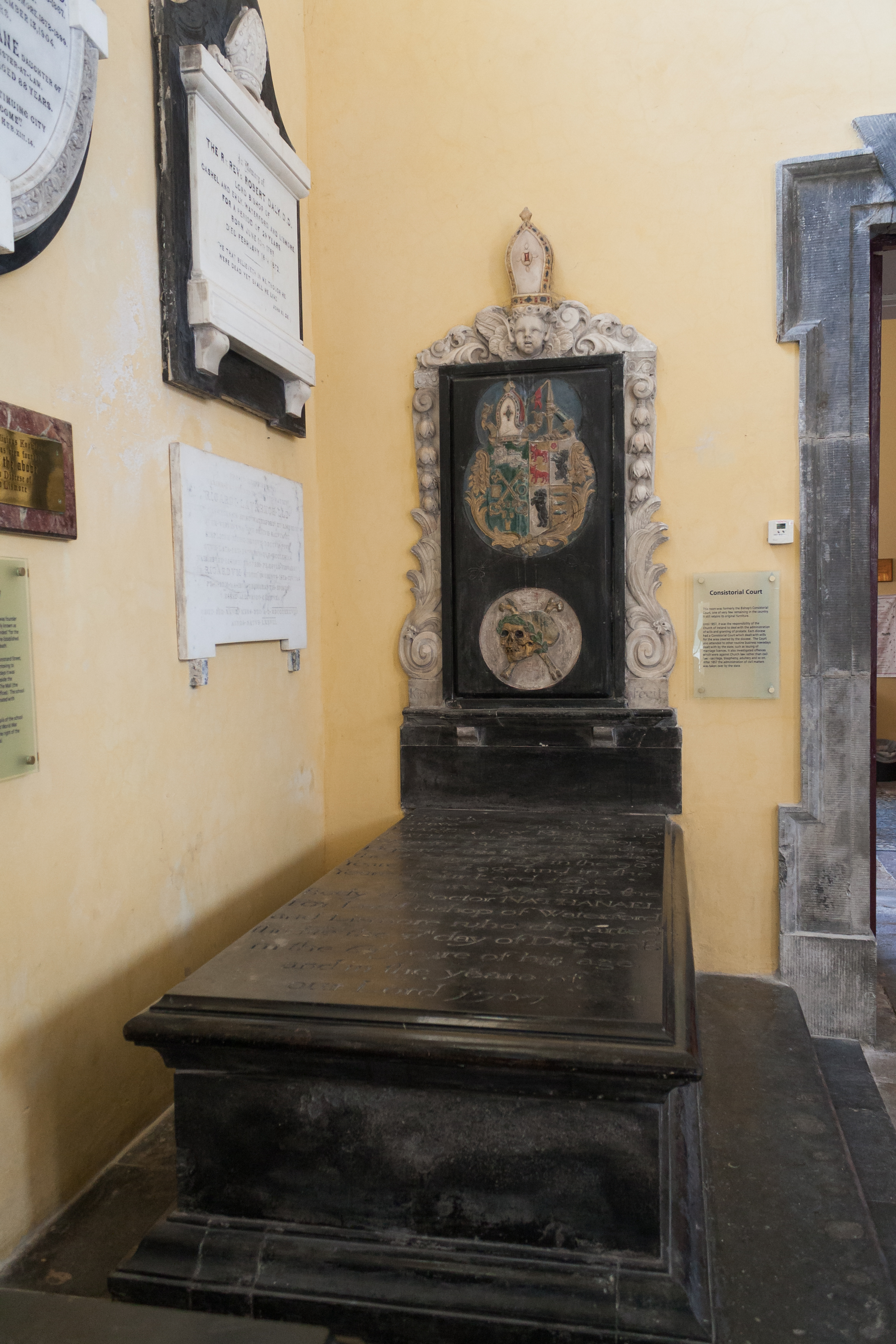
Monument of Nathaniel Foy in the vestibule of Christ Church Cathedral, Waterford, sculpted by William Kidwell.

He died in Dublin on 31 December 1707, and was buried at the west end of Waterford Cathedral, in St. Saviour's Chapel.

During his lifetime he expended 800 pound sterling on the improvement of the palace at Waterford, and by his will he established and endowed the free school at Grantstown. His only publication is "A Sermon preached in Christ's Church, Dublin, on 23 October 1698, being the anniversary thanksgiving for putting an end to the Irish Rebellion, which broke out on that day in 1641. Before the House of Lords," Dublin 1698, 4to.
