= Marmaduke Middleton =

English-Irish bishop (died 1593)

Marmaduke Middleton (died 1593) was an English bishop.

== Life ==
He was educated at the University of Oxford, but left before graduating. He was vicar of Coolock and Dunboyne, in Ireland, and then rector of Killare, County Meath. In 1579 he became bishop of Waterford and Lismore, in the Church of Ireland. In office during the Desmond Rebellions, he complained of the strong Catholic and rebel feeling in Waterford, and the attitude of the Mayor Patrick Walsh.

In 1582 he was translated, becoming bishop of St Davids in Wales. He was attacked by Lewis Gunter, who made many accusations against him. He then faced charges in the Court of High Commission, including forgery of a will. He was deprived of his see in 1593, dying shortly afterwards.

== Notes ==
Church of England titles
| Preceded by Richard Davies | Bishop of St David's; 1582–1592 | Succeeded by Anthony Rudd |
