= Nicholas Foran (bishop) =

Irish Roman Catholic Bishop

Nicholas Foran was the Roman Catholic Bishop of Waterford and Lismore.

== Life ==
Born in Butlerstown, Co. Waterford, he studied locally and went to Maynooth College to study for the priesthood. He was ordained in 1808, moving back to Waterford where he was Professor in the Diocesan College, in 1814 he was appointed president of St. John's College, Waterford. He served as parish priest in Lismore and then in Dungarvan, County Waterford.

He was elected President of Maynooth College in 1834, but declined to take the position, and was also offered the position of Bishop of Galway but did not accept due to ill health. In 1837 he was appointed Bishop of Waterford and Lismore.

In 1844, Dom Vincent de Paul Ryan, founding abbot of Mount Melleray Abbey gifted Foran with a sundial, now located at the Pastoral Centre on the grounds of the former St John's College, Waterford. In 1850, Foran attended a National Synod in Thurles. In 1854 Bishop Foran had the apse added, and a new altar installed in the Cathedral of the Most Holy Trinity.

== Death ==
He died suddenly on 11 May 1855 at Dr. Hally's house in Dungarvan.

Preceded by William Abraham	Bishop of Waterford and Lismore; 1837–1855	Succeeded by Dominic O’Brien
