= William Abraham (bishop) =

Irish Roman Catholic bishop

- Bishop of Waterford and Lismore
- Church: Roman Catholic Church
- Diocese: Waterford and Lismore
- In office: 1830—13 January 1837
- Predecessor: Patrick Kelly
- Successor: Nicholas Foran

Orders
- Consecration: 21 March 1830

Personal details
- Born: 1792 Glendine, Munster, Ireland
- Died: 13 January 1837 (aged 44–45) Waterford, Munster, Ireland
- Buried: Holy Trinity Chapel, Waterford, Munster, Ireland
- Denomination: Roman Catholicism
- Parents: Henry Abraham; Margaret Broderick
- Occupation: Priest, Teacher
- Education: St Patrick's College, Maynooth

William Abraham DD (1792–13 January 1837), was the Roman Catholic Bishop of Waterford and Lismore. He was born in Glendine, County Cork to Henry Abraham a blacksmith and Margaret Broderick, the family moved to Headborough, County Waterford where Abraham was brought up.

== Early life and career ==
William Abraham studied for the priesthood in St. Patrick's College, Maynooth and following ordination he taught in St. John's College, Waterford.

In 1830 he was appointed Bishop of Waterford and Lismore, and consecrated on 21 March 1831 in Waterford. Mount Melleray Abbey was established under his jurisdiction in 1833. As bishop he was unpopular with Irish Nationalists and other Catholic clergy and was seen as favouring British government policy on a number of issues. He even voted for the anti-Catholic emancipation candidate in the famous Stuarts Election. Bishop Abraham died on 13 January 1837. He was succeeded by Nicholas Foran as bishop, Foran having been the favourite to get the bishopric when Abraham was appointed. He is buried in the chapel of the Holy Trinity, Waterford.

Catholic Church titles
Preceded by Patrick Kelly	Bishop of Waterford and Lismore; 1830–1837	Succeeded by Nicholas Foran
