= Bishop of Waterford and Lismore =

Irish Christian ecclesiastical position

The Bishop of Waterford and Lismore is an episcopal title which takes its name after the city of Waterford and town of Lismore in Ireland. The title was used by the Church of Ireland until 1838, and is still used by the Roman Catholic Church.

== History ==
The bishopric is a union of the episcopal sees of Waterford and Lismore which were united by Pope Urban V in 1363. Following the Reformation, there were parallel successions.

In the Church of Ireland the see continued until 1833 when it became part of the archbishopric of Cashel. In 1838, the Anglican province of Cashel lost its metropolitan status and became the bishopric of Cashel and Waterford. It was further united with the Sees of Ossory, Ferns and Leighlin to become the united bishopric of Cashel and Ossory in 1977.

In the Roman Catholic Church the title remains as separate bishopric. The present incumbent is Alphonsus Cullinan, Bishop of the Roman Catholic Diocese of Waterford and Lismore, who was appointed by the Holy See on 2 February 2015 and ordained bishop on 12 April 2015.

== Pre-Reformation bishops ==
Pre-Reformation Bishops of Waterford and Lismore
From	Until	Incumbent	Notes
1363	1394	Thomas le Reve	Appointed Bishop of Lismore in 1358. Became Bishop of Waterford and Lismore on 16 June 1363 when Pope Urban V united the two dioceses, and received possession of the temporalities on 7 October 1363. Died in office before September 1394
1394	1396	Robert Read	Appointed on 9 September 1394. Translated to Carlisle on 26 January 1396, thence to Chichester on 5 October 1396.
1396	1397	Thomas Sparkford	Previously a priest of the Diocese of Exeter in England. Appointed bishop on 27 January 1396. Died in office before July 1397.
1397	1400	John Deping	Appointed on 11 July 1397. Died in office on 4 February 1400.
1400	1407	Thomas Snell	Formerly Arcdeacon of Glendalough. Appointed on 26 May 1400 and received the temporalities on 16 November 1400. Translated to Ossory on 11 March 1407.
1407	1409	Roger of Appleby	Translated from Dromore before October 1407. Died in office before August 1409.
1409	1414	John Geese (1st term)	Appointed on 23 August 1409. Deprived by Antipope John XXIII in February 1414.
1414	1422	Thomas Colby	Formerly Bishop-designate of Elphin. Appointed by Antipope John XXIII in February 1414. Died in office on before December 1422.
1422	1425	John Geese (2nd term)	Appointed again on 4 December 1422. Acted as a suffragan bishop in the Diocese of London 1424. Died in office on 22 December 1425.
1426	1446	Richard Cantwell	Formerly Archdeacon of Lismore. Appointed on 27 February 1426. Died in office on 7 May 1446.
1446	c.1472	Robert Poer	Formerly Dean and Archdeacon of Lismore. Appointed on 2 September 1446 and consecrated on 23 August 1447. Died in office circa 1472.
1473	unknown	Richard Martin (bishop-designate)	Appointed on 9 March 1473, but was not consecrated. Later appointed Bishop of St David's in 1482.
1475	1483	John Bulcomb (de Cutwart)	Appointed on 17 March 1475. Resigned before 17 October 1483.
1480	unknown	Nicol Ó hAonghusa	Formerly Abbot of Fermoy. Appointed on 20 May 1480. Death date unknown.
1483	1519	Thomas Purcell	Appointed on 17 October 1483 and consecrated after 6 October 1483. Resigned on 13 April 1519.

== Bishops during the Reformation ==
Bishops of Waterford and Lismore during the Reformation
From	Until	Incumbent	Notes
1519	1550	Nicholas Comyn	Translated from Ferns. Appointed by the Holy See on 13 April 1519 and swore the Oath of Supremacy at Clonmel early in 1539. Deprived or resigned on 21 July 1550 and died on 12 July 1551.
1550	1551	John Magrath	Appointed by the Holy See on 21 July 1550, but was not recognized by the Crown. Died circa 1551.
1551	1578	Patrick Walsh	Dean of Waterford (1547–1566). Nominated bishop by King Edward VI on 9 June 1551 and consecrated by royal mandate on 23 October 1551. In the reign Queen Mary I, recognised bishop by the Holy See in around 1555/1556. At the accession of Queen Elizabeth I in 1558, he supported royal supremacy. Died in office in 1578.

== Post-Reformation bishops ==
=== Church of Ireland succession ===
Church of Ireland Bishops of Waterford and Lismore
From	Until	Incumbent	Notes
1579	1582	Marmaduke Middleton	Nominated on 11 April 1579 and appointed by letters patent on 31 May 1579. Translated to St David's on 30 November 1582.
1582	1589	The see was granted in commendam to Miler Magrath, Archbishop of Cashel.	
1589	1592	Thomas Wetherhead	Also recorded as Thomas Walley. Nominated on 21 March 1589 and appointed by letters patent on 20 July 1589. Died in office before 15 March 1592.
1592	1608	The see was granted again in commendam to Miler Magrath, Archbishop of Cashel.	
1608	1619	John Lancaster	Nominated on 5 January 1608 and appointed by letters patent on 26 February 1608. Died in office in 1619.
1619	1635	Michael Boyle	Nominated on 7 August 1619. Died in office on 29 December 1635.
1636	1640	John Atherton	Nominated on 5 April 1636 and appointed by letters patent on 4 May 1636. Executed on 5 December 1640.
1641	1646	Archibald Adair	Translated from Killala and Achonry. Nominated on 7 June 1641 and appointed by letters patent on 13 July 1641. Forced to flee the country during the Irish Rebellion of 1641. Deprived when the Episcopate was abolished in 1676 and died in Bristol circa 1647.
1646	1660	See vacant	
1660	1665	George Baker	Nominated on 6 August 1660 and consecrated on 27 January 1661. Died in office on 13 November 1665.
1666	1689	Hugh Gore	Nominated on 8 February 1666 and consecrated on 25 March 1666. Retired 1689, died 1691.
1691	1707	Nathaniel Foy	Nominated on 16 April 1691 and consecrated on 9 August 1691. Died in office on 31 December 1707.
1708	1740	Thomas Milles	Nominated on 17 January 1708 and consecrated on 18 April 1708. Died in office on 13 May 1740.
1740	1745	Charles Este	Translated from Ossory. Nominated on 10 July 1740 and appointed by letters patent on 4 October 1740. Died in office on 29 November 1745.
1746	1779	Richard Chenevix	Translated from Killaloe. Nominated on 23 December 1745 and appointed by letters patent on 15 January 1746. Died in office on 11 September 1779.
1779	1795	William Newcome	Translated from Ossory. Nominated on 22 October 1779 and appointed by letters patent on 5 November 1779. Translated to Armagh on 27 January 1795.
1795	1802	Richard Marlay	Translated from Clonfert and Kilmacduagh. Nominated on 11 March 1795 and appointed by letters patent on 21 March 1795. Died in office on 1 July 1802.
1802	1810	Power Le Poer Trench	Nominated on 18 August 1802 and consecrated on 21 November 1802. Translated to Elphin on 30 April 1810.
1810	1813	Joseph Stock	Translated from Killala and Achonry. Nominated on 12 April 1810 and appointed by letters patent on 1 May 1810. Died in office on 14 August 1813.
1813	1832	Richard Bourke	Nominated on 25 August 1813 and consecrated on 10 October 1813. Died in office on 15 November 1832.
1833	1838	The see part of the Church of Ireland archbishopric of Cashel	
1838	1977	The see part of the Church of Ireland bishopric of Cashel and Waterford	
Since 1977		The see part of the Church of Ireland bishopric of Cashel and Ossory	

=== Roman Catholic succession ===
Roman Catholic Bishops of Waterford and Lismore
From	Until	Incumbent	Notes
1578	1600	John White (vicar apostolic)	Appointed vicar apostolic by papal brief on 4 November 1578, and is said to have remained in the post until 1600.
1600	aft.1610	James White (vicar apostolic)	Appointed vicar apostolic by papal brief on 24 July 1600, and continued in the post until after 22 April 1610.
1623	1625	Peter Lombard (apostolic administrator)	Archbishop of Armagh (1601–1625). Appointed apostolic administrator by papal brief on 23 April 1623. Without coming to Ireland, died in Rome on 5 September 1625.
1625	1629	See vacant	
1629	1652	Patrick Comerford	Appointed on 12 February 1629 and consecrated on 18 March 1629. Died in office on 10 March 1652
1652	1657	See vacant	
1657	unknown	Patrick Hacket (vicar apostolic)	Appointed vicar apostolic by papal brief on 17 April 1657.
1671	1693	John Brenan	Appointed on 16 (or 26) May 1671, papal brief dated 19 May 1671, and consecrated on 6 September 1671. Translated to Cashel on 8 May 1677, but retained the administration of Waterford & Lismore until his death in 1693.
1693	1696	See vacant	
1696	1739	Richard Piers	Appointed on 21 May 1696. Died in office before 29 May 1739. Buried in the cathedral of Sens (France, actually Yonne department). Was vicaire-général of Sens (1739).
1739	1747	Sylvester Lloyd	Translated from Killaloe on 29 May 1739. Died in office in 1747.
1743	1745	Thomas Strich (coadjutor bishop)	Appointed coadjutor bishop on 18 December 1743. Died before succeeding on 20 February 1745.
1747	1775	Peter Creagh	Appointed coadjutor bishop on 12 April 1745 and succeeded in 1747. Died in office on 12 February 1775.
1775	1796	William Egan	Appointed coadjutor bishop on 3 February 1771, papal brief dated 8 March 1771, and consecrated on 19 May 1771. Succeeded diocesan bishop on 12 February 1775. Died in office on 22 July 1796.
1796	1803	Thomas Hussey	Appointed on 4 December 1796, papal brief dated 10 January 1797, and consecrated on 26 February 1797. Died in office on 11 July 1803.
1804	1816	John Power	Appointed on 7 January 1804, papal brief dated 27 January 1804, and consecrated on 25 April 1804. Died in office on 27 January 1816.
1817	1821	Robert Walsh	Appointed on 30 May 1817, papal brief dated 4 July 1817, and consecrated on 31 August 1817. Died in office on 1 October 1821.
1822	1829	Patrick Kelly	Translated from Richmond, U.S.A. Appointed on 3 (or 9) February 1822 and papal brief dated 22 February 1822. Died in office on 8 October 1829.
1829	1837	William Abraham	Appointed on 23 December 1829 and papal brief dated 12 January 1830. Died in office on 23 January 1837.
1837	1855	Nicholas Foran	Previously Bishop-designate of Galway in 1831. Appointed Bishop of Waterford and Lismore on 28 May 1837, papal brief 6 June 1837, and consecrated on 24 August 1837. Died in office on 11 May 1855.
1855	1873	Dominic O'Brien	Appointed on 29 July 1855, papal brief dated 3 August 1855, and consecrated on 30 September 1855. Died in office on 12 June 1873.
1873	1887	John Power	Appointed coadjutor bishop on 20 May 1873, succeeded on 12 June 1873, and consecrated 20 July 1873. Died in office on 6 December 1887.
1887	1889	Pierse Power	Appointed coadjutor bishop on 29 January 1886 and consecrated 7 March 1886. Succeeded diocesan bishop on 6 December 1887. Died in office on 22 May 1889.
1889	1891	John Egan	Appointed on 19 November 1889 and consecrated 19 January 1890. Died in office on 10 June 1891.
1892	1915	Richard Alphonsus Sheehan	Appointed on 15 January 1892 and consecrated on 31 January 1892. Died in office on 14 August 1915.
1916	1932	Bernard Hackett	Appointed on 29 January 1916 and consecrated on 19 March 1916. Died in office on 1 June 1932.
1933	1942	Jeremiah Kinane	Appointed on 21 April 1933 and consecrated 29 June 1933. Translated to the Archdiocese of Cashel and Emly as coadjutor archbishop on 31 January 1942 and succeeded metropolitan archbishop of Cashel and Emly on 11 September 1946.
1943	1965	Daniel Cohalan	Appointed on 3 February 1943 and consecrated 4 April 1943. Died in office on 27 January 1965.
1965	1993	Michael Russell	Appointed on 8 November 1965 and ordained bishop on 19 December 1965. Retired on 27 May 1993 and died on 12 January 2009.
1993	2013	William Lee	Appointed on 27 May 1993 and ordained bishop on 25 July 1993. Retired on the grounds of ill-health on 1 October 2013.
2015	present	Alphonsus Cullinan	Appointed on 2 February 2015 and ordained bishop on 12 April 2015.

== See also ==
- Waterford Cathedral
- Lismore Cathedral, Ireland
