= Cathedral of the Most Holy Trinity, Waterford =

Cathedral of the Most Holy Trinity
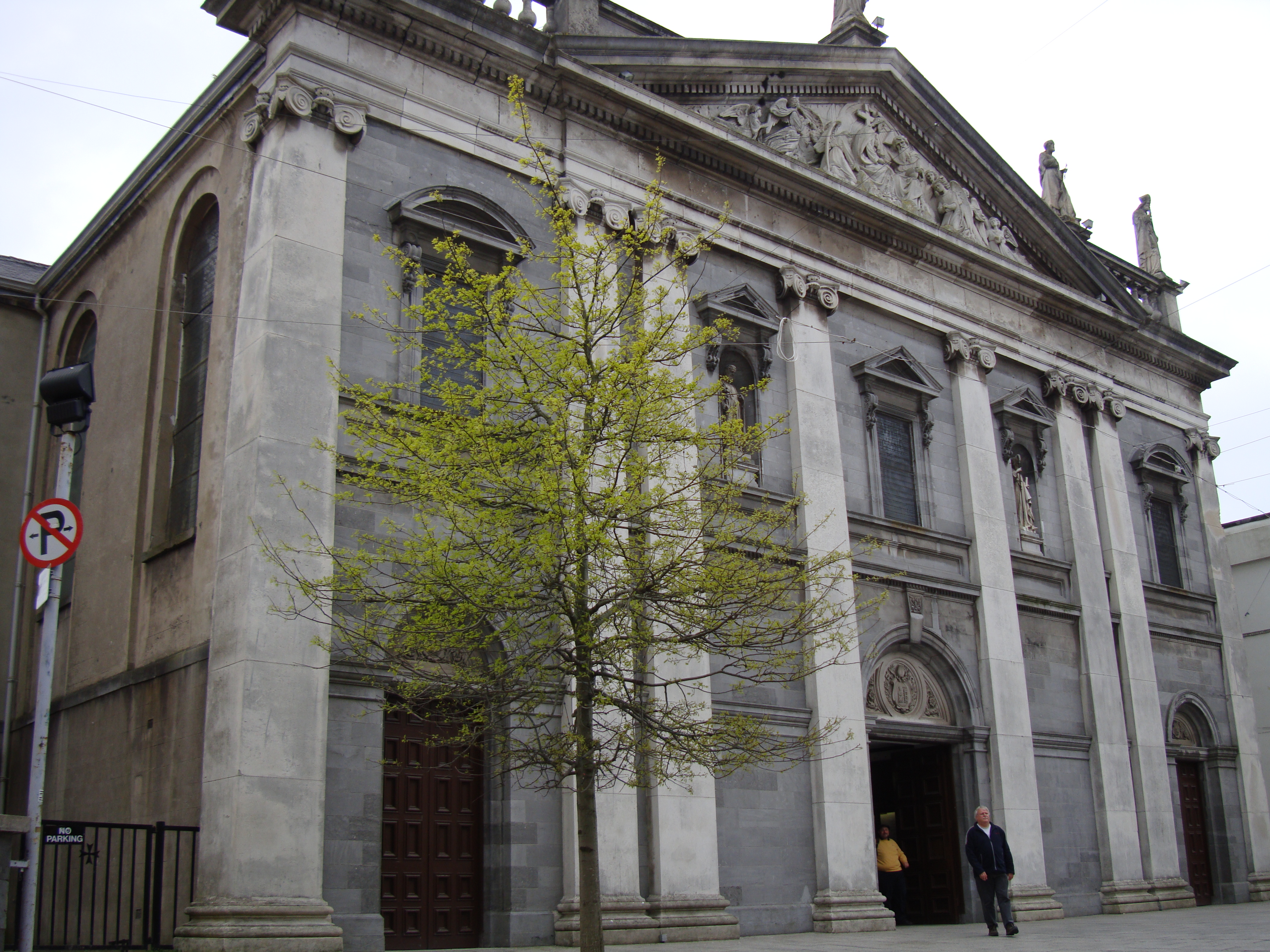

- Location in Ireland
- 52.2614°N 7.11109°W
- Location: Barronstrand Street, Waterford, Ireland
- Denomination: Roman Catholic

History
- Status: Cathedral
- Consecrated: 1793

Architecture
- Style: Classical
- Completed: 1793

Specifications
- Materials: Limestone

Administration
- Province: Cashel and Emly
- Diocese: Waterford and Lismore
- Parish: Cathedral

Clergy
- Bishop: Alphonsus Cullinan

The Cathedral of the Most Holy Trinity is the cathedral church of the Roman Catholic Diocese of Waterford and Lismore located in Barronstrand Street, Waterford City, Ireland. The cathedral is the oldest post-Reformation Catholic cathedral in Ireland, pre-dating the Roman Catholic Relief Act 1829 by some 36 years.

== History ==
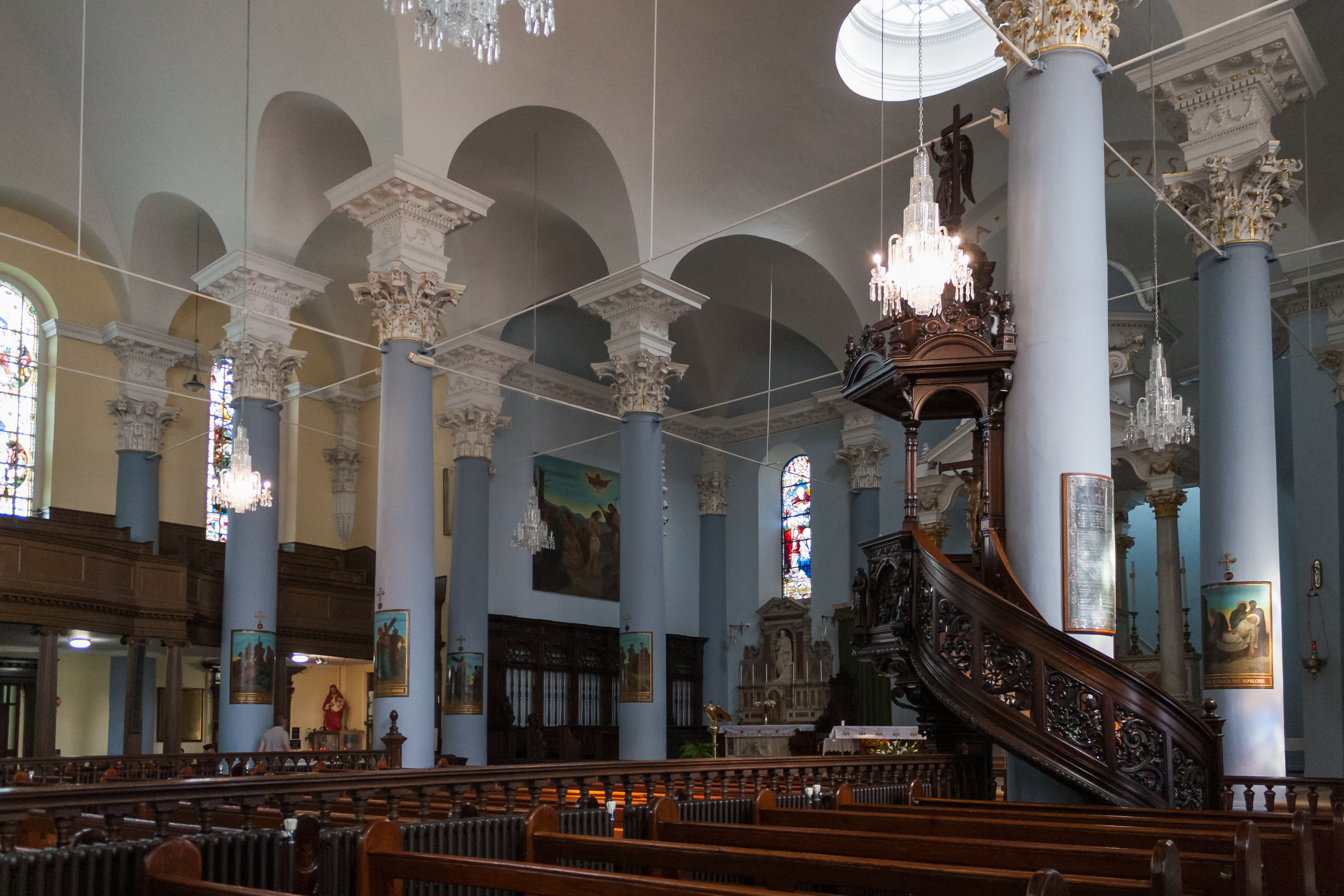
The cathedral seen from the South Aisle

The cathedral was designed by John Roberts in 1793 (after the Roman Catholic Relief Act 1793) and has the distinction of being the oldest post-Reformation cathedral of the Roman Catholic Church in Ireland. The cathedral was built under the direction of Rev. Dean Thomas Hearn, D.D., the cathedral dean. Roberts also designed Christ Church Cathedral, Waterford, and is said to have supervised the construction of the Catholic cathedral by attending the site every morning, and apparently 'died from the effects of a cold caught within the unfinished structure'.

A chapel – known in the city as the 'Big Chapel' – had previously stood on the same ground, having been constructed there in 1693 at the height of the Penal Laws on the request of the Roman Catholic community of Waterford. The Big Chapel replaced a converted store, known as the Old Store, which was adopted as a place of worship following the Stuart Restoration in 1660, when conditions afforded Catholics some respite. The Old Store stood against the old northwest city wall, on a site opposite the west end of the present building.

The cathedral was extended and modified many times over its history – it was initially to a square footprint, with later extensions to both the east and west ends of the building. The sanctuary was extended to the east in 1829–1837 during the episcopate of Bishop Abraham, and in 1854 Bishop Foran had the apse added, and a new altar installed. The cathedral's grand William Hill & Sons organ was installed in 1858. Two side altars – dedicated to Our Lady (Epistle or South chapel), and to St Joseph (Gospel/North chapel) – were installed, as were external railings and gates (the latter removed in the 1960s), between 1855 and 1872, during Bishop O'Brien's time.

Bishop John Power made some of the most significant additions – in 1881, he commissioned the baldachin, and a new altar (incorporating the front of its predecessor) and reredos. Bishop Power also commissioned an elaborate polychrome decoration of the ceiling and walls. In 1883, Bishop Power commissioned George Goldie, London, to design the imposing Baroque-style pulpit, the fine choir stalls and the bishop's chair or cathedra. These items were carved in oak by Buisine & Fils of Lille in France. The cathedral's fine stained glass windows were installed between 1883 and 1887, most commissioned from Mayer of Munich. In the final major 19th century modification, a classical, Ionic-form cut-stone external west facade was installed during Bishop Sheehan's time. Not all of these changes found immediate favour – 'neither the decorations of 1881 nor the improvements of 1893 commended themselves to the conservative Catholics of Waterford, who considered Bishop Power's scheme too gaudy and Bishop Sheehan's facade unnecessary and inferior".

Further changes occurred in the early 20th century, including side-extensions to the organ gallery, and changes to the entrance area under the organ gallery. In the 1930s, during the episcopate of Bishop Kinane, the cathedral was redecorated, and a matrix of steel rods was installed between the cathedral's columns, at capital level. These rods monitor the movement of the columns, which are built on the marshy foundations of the cathedral site. Evidence of the degree of movement is easily seen on the north arcade of the nave.

The cathedral was refurbished in 1977, and to meet the requirements of the Second Vatican Council, the sanctuary was re-ordered. The choir stalls were moved to the outer walls, and the cathedra relocated, and whilst the side-chapels are now obscured, the fine stalls, cathedra and pulpit were at least retained and preserved. A new altar was installed so that Mass could be celebrated ad populum (facing the people) – this altar incorporates carvings from the sanctuary of St Carthage's Church, Lismore – 'a sensitive gesture to earlier history'. In 1979, a gift of ten crystal chandeliers from Waterford Crystal enhanced the glory of the cathedral. A complete re-flooring of the building and a restructuring of the sacristy took place between 1989 and 1992. Further work was completed in November 2006 including re-roofing of the cathedral.

== Cathedral administrators ==
The cathedral is, since 1810, a mensal parish, with the Bishop of Waterford and Lismore as parish priest, and an administrator appointed as priest in charge.

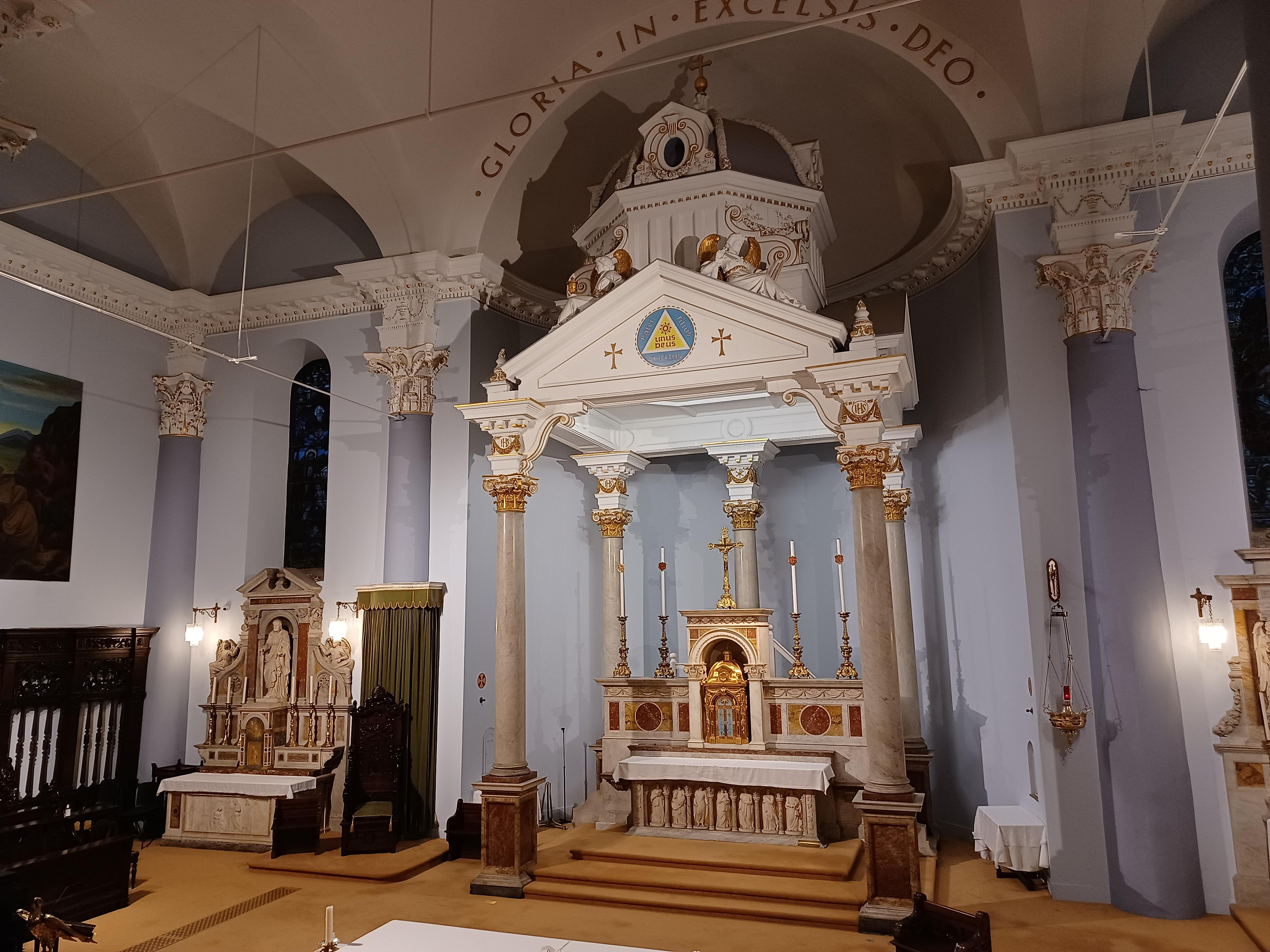
The cathedral sanctuary and baldachin

Pastors of the ‘Big Chapel’

- Rev, Paul Bellew, V.G, in exile, but Parish Priest c.1704–1732
- Rev. William O'Meara, V.G, 1728–43
- Rev. William Browne, 1743–47
- Rev. Patrick Fitzgerald, 1747–67
- Rev. William Francis Galwey, 1767–72

The new cathedral dean

- Rev. Dr. Thomas Hearn, 1772–1810

On Dean Hearn's death Holy Trinity became a mensal parish, with administrators as follow:

- Rev. Garrett Connolly, 1810–17
- Rev. Thomas Murphy, 1817–18
- Rev. Eugene Condon, 1818–28
- Rev. Thomas Dixon, 1828–43
- Rev. Richard Fitzgerald 1843–62
- Rev. Thomas English, 1862–67
- Rev. Edward P. Walsh, 1867–69
- Rev. Patrick Ryan, D.D., 1869–83
- Rev. Robert Power, 1883–86
- Rev. Patrick J. Sheehan 1886–91
- Rev. William O'Donnell, 1891–1902
- Rev. Thomas F. Furlong, 1902–12
- Rev. William O'Connell, 1912–24
- Rev. John McCarthy, 1924–35
- Rev. John Warren, 1935–36
- Rev. John O’Connor, 1936–46
- Rev. William Cahill, 1946–51
- Rev. Richard Coady, 1951–68
- Rev. William Hallanan, 1968–72
- Rev. Charles Lawn, 1972–73
- Rev. Francis Hopkins, 1973–79
- Rev. Thomas Nugent, 1979–85
- Rev Nicholas O’Mahony, 1985–1995
- Rev William Ryan, 1995–2001
- Rev Joseph Condon, 2001–2007
- Rev Gerard Langford, 2007–2012
- Rev Paul Waldron, 2012–2016
- Rev Edmond Cullinan, 2016–2021
- Rev John Harris, 2021–present

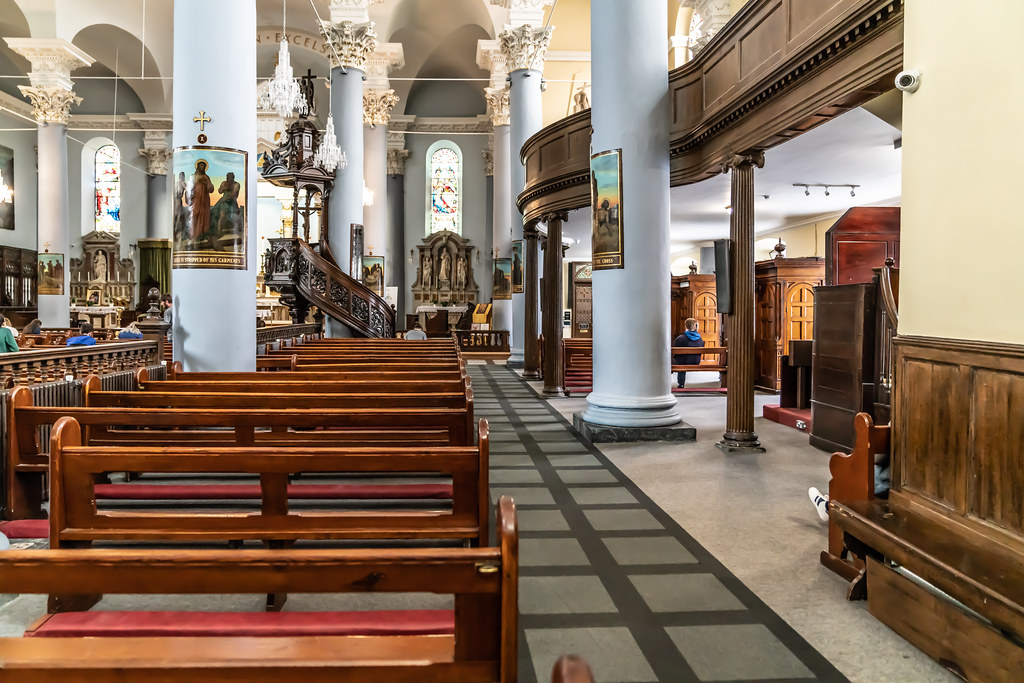
The South Aisle, with a view to the Blessed Virgin Mary altar

== Cathedral organ ==
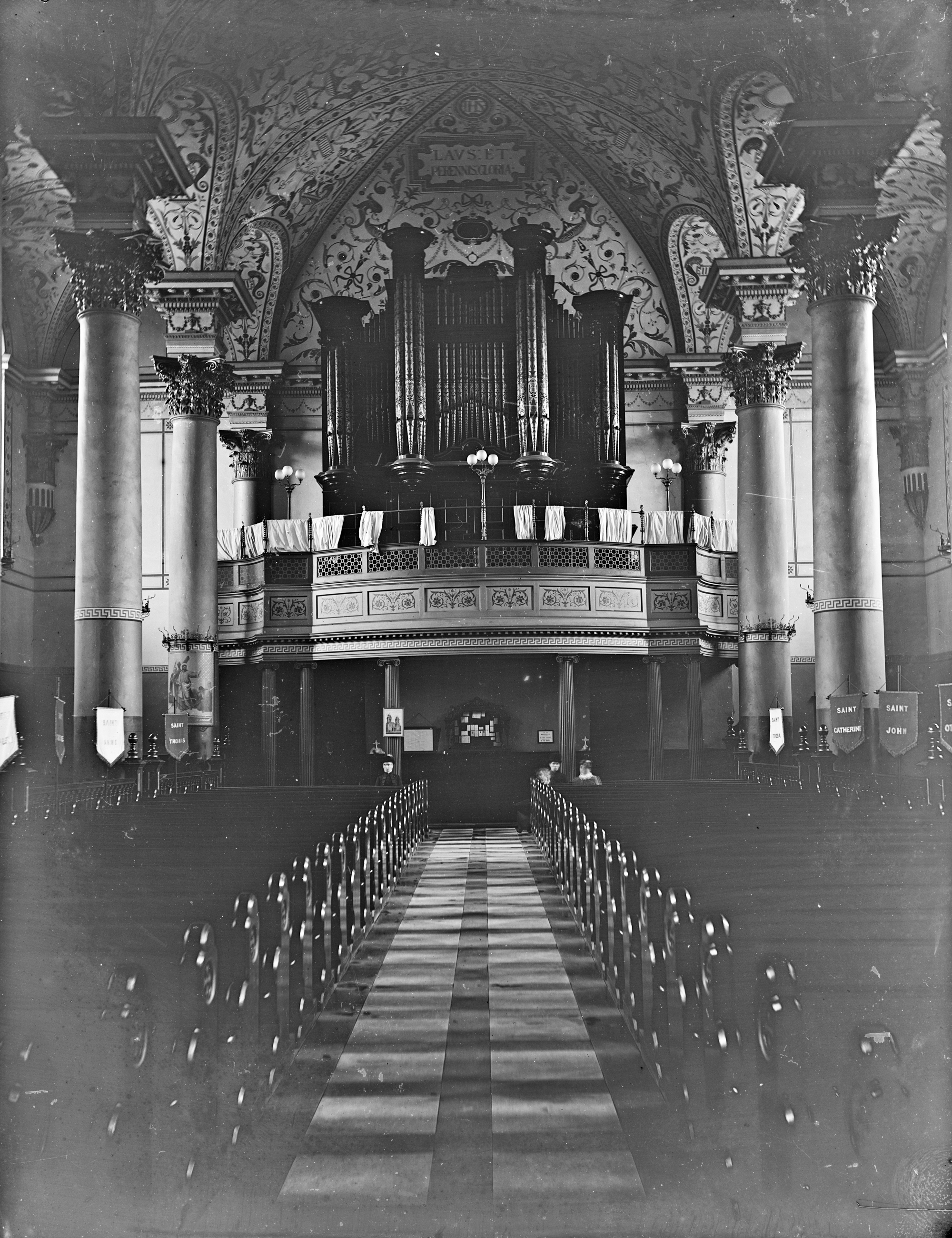
Interior of the cathedral – from the Poole collection, c.1899. The photograph shows the Hill pipe organ in its 1858 form, and the Victorian painted ceiling decorations

The cathedral's pipe organ was built in 1858 by William Hill & Sons of London, and is the third organ installed in the cathedral. The first was built for the former Big Chapel in 1773, and presumably transferred to the new cathedral. This organ was, in turn, replaced by a one-manual organ built in 1826 by Calvin and William Porter Draper who maintained a workshop in Manor Street, Waterford in the early 19th century. The Draper brothers were of the Liverpool organbuilding family known by the alternative spelling Dreaper.

The Hill organ was inaugurated on Sunday 29 August 1858 with the celebrated organist W.T. Best playing the inaugural recital. The 1858 organ had three manuals with 43 speaking stops, and was an example of the Hill's German system organ, with C-compass on all divisions, and full-compass Swell. The organ was hand blown, with mechanical action and a pneumatic-lever to the Great.

The organ was conservatively rebuilt by the Hill firm in 1901, with only two tonal changes. The action was changed to tubular pneumatic, the key compass extended and a detached draw-stop console added, and a large hydraulic blowing plant installed. The blowing was converted to electric at some stage in the early 20th century. The organ was extensively rebuilt by the Irish Organ Company in 1965. Significant tonal and structural changes were made, the action converted to electro-pneumatic, the compass extended, and a detached stop-key console installed.

=== Organist and choirmasters ===
- J. Hayes (1783–?)
- F.T. Howard (1840–1858)
- M. Bilton (1858–1883)
- J.F. Murray (1883–1906)
- J. Storer (1906–1916)
- Professor Antoine Begas (1916–1936)
- Stanley Bowyer (1936–1941)
- M.J. Bowman (1941–1944)
- John Croghan (1944–1960)
- Stanley Bowyer (1960–1980)
- Fintan O’Carroll (1980–1981)
- Kevin O’Carroll (1981–1997)
- Patrick Butler (1997–2005)
- Cecilia Kehoe (2005–2016)
- David Forde (2016–present)
