= St John's College, Waterford =

Irish Roman Catholic seminary

- Latin: S. Joannis Collegum Waterfordiae
- Active: 1807–1999
- Founder: Bishop John Power DD
- Affiliations: Diocese of Waterford and Lismore
- Religious affiliation: Roman Catholic
- Academic affiliations: NCEA(1989-2001)
- Location: Waterford, Ireland

St John's College (or St John's Seminary) was a Roman Catholic seminary founded in 1807 for the diocese of Waterford and Lismore.

== Foundation ==
The college was founded by Bishop John Power DD. It was one of many seminaries founded in Ireland following the reliefs of the penal laws by the Catholic Relief Bill. The college was formed out of two schools one a classical school of Rev. Thomas Flynn DD, the other an Academy of Dr. Geoffrey Keating and the new college was located in Manor Hill in Waterford, originally a mansion of the Wyse family. In 1868 a new building for the college was built at John's Hill, the building was designed by the architect Mr. George Goldie from the London firm of Goldie and Child, the foundation stone was laid by the Rev. Dr. O'Brien Bishop of Waterford and a former president of St. John's.

From its formation until 1873 when it became exclusively a seminary the college educated lay as well as clerical students, it maintains some lay teaching staff until 1878. Students would study, theology, philosophy, and humanities such as mathematics, Latin, Greek, and English.

In the 1830s the college established a mission to Newfoundland in Canada, over the years the a number of priests trained would have served dioceses around the world, with about 250 serving in the United States.

In 1977 St. John's began offering Certificates and Diplomas in Philosophy and Theology validated by the Irish Governments National Council for Education Awards (NCEA) the forerunner of HETAC and QQI.

== People Associated with St John's ==
=== Presidents of the College ===
The first president of the college was Rev Thomas Murphy; others who served as president (or rector) of the college include

- Rev Garrett Connolly V.G.,
- Rev Dr Nicholas Foran (1814–1818)
- Rev Dr William Abraham (1824–1830), appointed Bishop of Waterford.
- Rev James Patrick Cooke DD (1830–1834 and again briefly from 1853 to 1854 when he died),
- Rev Dominick O'Brien DD (1834–1853),
- Rev Michael Wall (1854–1855),
- Rev Patrick Cleary DD (1856–1858) a brother of a former president,
- Rev Patrick Delaney DD (1858–1873),
- Rev James Vincent Cleary DD (CUI) (1873–1876), he became Archbishop of Kingston, Ontario.
- Rev Pierse Power (1876–1881),
- Rev Joseph Austin Phelan (1881–1888),
- Rev Roger O'Riordan (1888–1889),
- Rev Canon William Sheehy DD (1889–1902),
- Very Rev Canon William Walsh DD (1902–1910),
- Rev Denis Whelan DD OSA (1910–1919),
- Very Rev Canon William Byrne, STL DD (1919–1930),
- Very Rev Canon John Kelleher, STL BCL (1930–1936),
- Rev William Coffey (1936–19??),
- Very Rev Canon Thomas Cassidy,
- Right Rev Monsignor John Shine LCL, (1974–1980), vice-president (1971–1974) and Professor of Canon Law and Moral Theology
- Very Rev Canon Martin Slattery (1980–1985)
- Very Rev Michael N. O'Connor (1985–1994)
- Very Rev Dr Michael Mullins PP, BD, STL, LSS, STD (1994–1998), Professor of Scripture (1975–1998)
- Very Rev Paul Murphy PP

=== Students of St John's College ===
The Archbishop of Halifax William Walsh attended St John's, as did the Historian of Dr Patrick C. Power. Irish language activist Professor Michael O'Hickey dismissed from Maynooth over his stance on the language, studied at St John's, as did the author, language activist and musician Father Risteard De Hindeberg. Dr Tobias Kirby studied at St John's before going to Rome, where he went on to become rector of the Pontifical Irish College and an archbishop. Patrick Joseph McGrath who became Bishop of San Jose in California. John Vaughan trained as a priest in St John's, he transferred to the Episcopal Church and was elected a suffragan bishop in 2012 for the Diocese of the Eastern United States.

Bishop Edwin Regan of Wrexham also trained at St John's. Another bishop who commenced his priestly education in St John's (prior to going to Maynooth) was Bishop Michael Sheehan, he returned to St Johns's as a professor for two years.

Bishop William Lee MBE of Clifton in England, was a student in St John's before continuing his training in Oscott.

Bishop Séamus Cunningham of Newcastle and Hexham also trained in St. John's. The former bishop of Southwark, the Waterford-born Charles Henderson, studied at St John's.

Lawyer John Hearne SC, who helped draft the Irish Constitution, studied at St John's before transferring to Maynooth.

Archbishop of Toronto John Walsh was educated at St. John's before moving to Canada to complete his clerical training.

The Rt Rev Edward Barron, who served as bishop of Liberia, studied at St John's, before going to Rome; he returned to St John's serving as a professor before becoming a bishop.

Pat Buckley studied there from 1973 to 1976 and was ordained in the college on 6 June 1976, by the Bishop of Waterford and Lismore, Dr Michael Russell.

The writer and editor of the Waterford News Edmund Downey and Irish Liberal Party MP for Waterford City James Delahunty were also educated at St John's.

Bishop James Maher DD (1840–1905) of Port Augusta, Australia (1896–1905) studied Philosophy and Theology at St John's before being ordained in Maynooth.

J. F. X. O'Brien, the Irish nationalist and Fenian, who served as an MP for Mayo and Cork city studied divinity in St. John's.

== Closure ==
St. John's closed as a seminary in June 1999 due to the decline in vocations, with the 13 students transferred to other seminaries. A number of church and community groups used its lands and buildings, instead such as diocesan offices, Accord and Cura. The local Scouts have a purpose-built facility on the grounds of the college.

In 2007 the college building and some of the land was sold to the Respond! Housing association, with a new pastoral centre being built for the diocese and opened in 2005
