= Roman Catholic Diocese of Waterford and Lismore =

Catholic diocese in Ireland

Diocese of Waterford and Lismore Dioecesis Vaterfordiensis et Lismoriensis Deoise Phort Láirge agus Lios Mór

Catholic
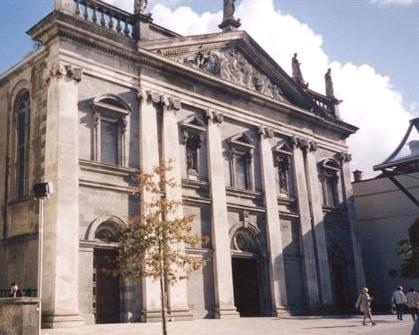
- The Cathedral of the Most Holy Trinity, Waterford

Location
- Country: Ireland
- Territory: Waterford city and County Waterford along with parts of counties Tipperary and Cork
- Ecclesiastical province: Province of Cashel
- Metropolitan: Archdiocese of Cashel and Emly

Statistics
- Area: 981 sq mi (2,540 km^{2})
- Population: Total; Catholics: (as of 2010); 152,136; 144,027 (94.7%)

Information
- Denomination: Catholic
- Sui iuris church: Latin Church
- Rite: Roman Rite
- Established: United 16 June 1363
- Cathedral: Cathedral of the Most Holy Trinity, Waterford
- Patron saint: Otteran, Carthage and Declan

Current leadership
- Pope: Leo XIV
- Bishop: Alphonsus Cullinan
- Metropolitan Archbishop: Kieran O'Reilly, Archbishop of Cashel and Emly
- Vicar General: Archdeacon: Nicholas O’Mahony

Map
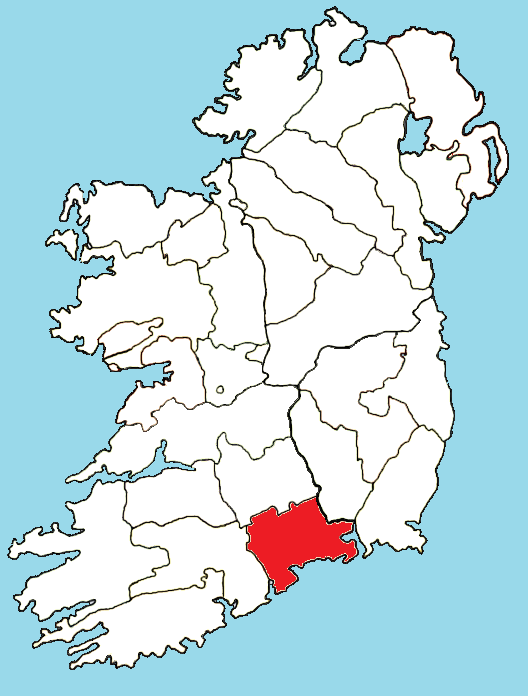

Website
- https://waterfordlismore.ie/

The Diocese of Waterford and Lismore (Irish: Deoise Phort Láirge agus Leasa Móire ) is a Latin diocese of the Catholic Church in Ireland. It is one of six suffragan dioceses in the ecclesiastical province of Cashel (also known as Munster) and is subject to the Archbishop of Cashel and Emly. Alphonsus Cullinan was installed Bishop of the Diocese of Waterford and Lismore on 12 April 2015. The Bishop Emeritus is William Lee.

== Parishes ==
The geographic remit of the diocese includes Waterford city and the county of Waterford as well as part of counties Tipperary and Cork. As well as Waterford city, the diocese contains the towns of Cahir, Carrick-on-Suir, Dungarvan and Tramore. There are 45 parishes in the diocese with an estimated Catholic population of 144,000.

Diocese	Town / County	Parishes or Group Parishes
Waterford and Lismore	Waterford city	Ballybricken (Trinity Without); Holy Family; Sacred Heart; St John’s; St Joseph & St Benildus & St Mary’s; St Paul’s; St Saviour’s; Trinity Within and St Patricks; Kilbarry
Waterford and Lismore	Waterford County	Abbeyside, Ballinroad and Garranbane; Aglish, Ballinameela and Mount Stuart; Ardmore & Grange; Ballyduff Upper; Butlerstown; Cappoquin; Clashmore; Dungarvan; Dunhill; Kilgobinet; Killea (Dunmore East); Kilrossanty (Kilmacthomas); Knockanore (Tallow); Lismore; Modeligo and Affane; Newtown (Kilmacthomas); Portlaw; Ring & Old Parish; Stradbally; Ballylaneen & Faha; Tallow; Tramore & Carbally; Touraneena & The Nire; Rathgormack and Clonea; Carrickbeg & Windgap.
Waterford and Lismore	County Tipperary	Ardfinnan (Clonmel); Ballylooby; Ballyneale (Carrick-on-Suir); Ballyporeen; Cahir; Kilsheelan & Kilcash; SS Peter & Paul (Clonmel); St. Mary's (Clonmel); St Oliver Plunkett (Clonmel); Powerstown & Lisronagh; Carrick-on-Suir & Faugheen; Clogheen; Newcastle & Fourmilewater.

== See also ==
- Catholic Church in Ireland
- Barony of Iffa and Offa East
