= Maynooth Grant =

Cash grant from the British government to a Catholic seminary in Ireland

The Maynooth Grant was a cash grant from the British government to a Catholic seminary in Ireland. In 1845, the Conservative Prime Minister, Sir Robert Peel, sought to improve the relationship between Catholic Ireland and Protestant Britain by increasing the annual grant from the British government to St Patrick's College, Maynooth, a Catholic seminary in Ireland in dilapidated condition. It aroused a major political controversy in the 1840s, reflecting the anti-Irish and anti-Catholic feelings of many British Protestants.

== Background ==
The Maynooth College Act 1795 founded a Catholic seminary in Maynooth, Ireland. It was named St Patrick's College.

== Overview ==
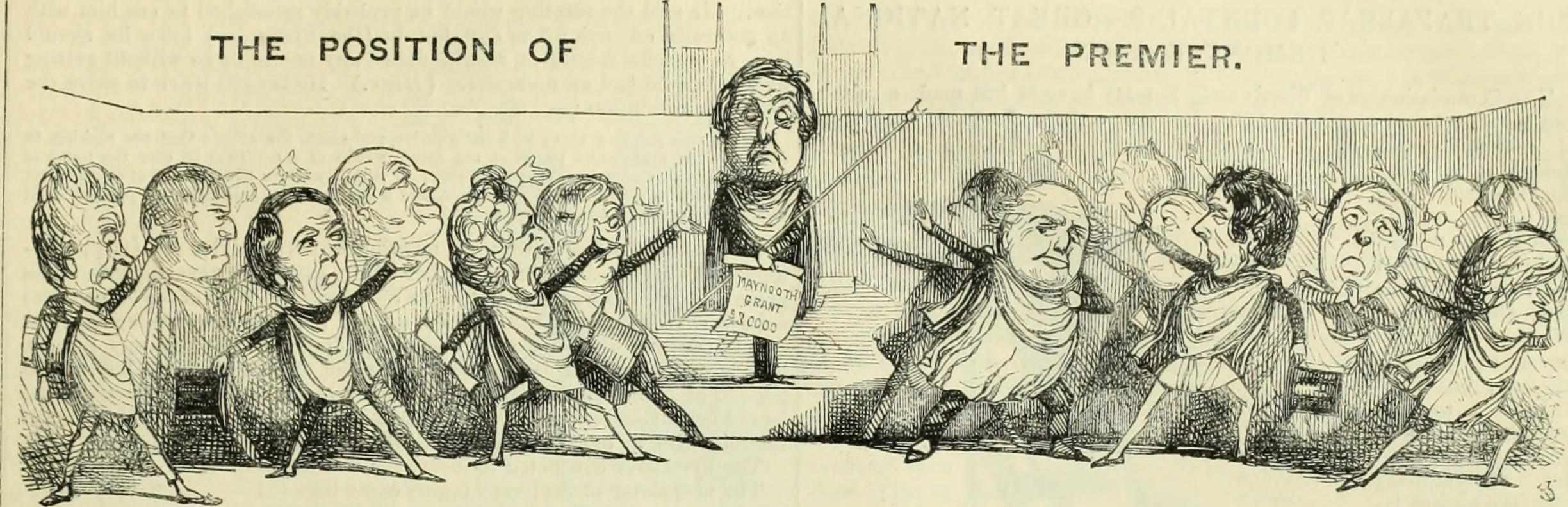
Peel, with the Maynooth Grant, stands in the Commons. Those on the left of the picture applaud him, those on the right abuse him. From Punch, 1845.

Peel made the proposal to increase government funding to Maynooth College in 1845. Under his proposal, the seminary would receive upwards of £26,000 annually and a grant of £30,000 for repairs. Peel's colleagues warned repeatedly that it was politically dangerous for the Party, but Peel felt he had to do it lest Ireland explode. Peel realized that there was agitation in Ireland to repeal the union in 1843. Catholic clergy were active and Peel hoped to win over their support and separate them from popular nationalism.

Conservatives led by the Ultra-Tory Anglican faction, were outraged that the Prime Minister would finance a Catholic seminary. They mounted a firestorm of vituperative opposition. Queen Victoria supported Peel: "I am sure poor Peel ought to be blessed by all Catholics for the many and noble ways in which he stands forth to protect and do good for poor Ireland. But the bigotry, the wicked and blind passion it brings forth is quite dreadful, and I blush for Protestantism!" In 1849, she and Prince Albert made a point of visiting the seminary on their visit to Ireland.

In 1845, John Plumptre, member of Parliament for East Kent and an opponent of the Grant, issued an address, saying:

As you value His favour, as you deprecate His frown, as your hearts and your altars are dear to you; as you would retain and enjoy for yourselves, and transmit to your children, the blessings and privileges which belong to you as Protestants, I beseech you to oppose, with all zeal and firmness, with all temperance and calmness, with all loyal attachment to your Sovereign—with all union among yourselves—with all charity towards all men—with all prayer and supplication towards God—this fresh inroad about to be made upon your consciences,--this new and deep wound to your highest and holiest feelings.

This is strong evidence of the moral implications of the issue in Parliament.

The Anti-Maynooth Conference was held in London with over 1,000 delegates from England and Ireland and more than a million signatures were collected to oppose the grant.

Also contributing to the political unrest was a group known as the "Voluntaryists," who were also opposed to the grant. Their issue with it was not, however, over any sort of religious difference. They opposed the idea of the government granting money to any private institution of higher education, and so were upset about the Maynooth Grant.

The 1845 Maynooth bill (which became the Maynooth College Act 1845 (8 & 9 Vict. c. 25)), was carried by 323 to 176 votes. Together with the repeal of the Corn Laws, it split Peel's Tories, eventually leading to the creation of the modern Liberal and Conservative parties: William Gladstone had previously opposed the Maynooth grant in his book The State in its Relations with the Church in 1838 that a Protestant country should not pay money to other churches, and confusingly resigned from the government when the proposed increase conflicted with his earlier principles while still voting for it in Commons; Benjamin Disraeli maintained his opposition on constitutional and political grounds, breaking with his Young England colleagues to gain reactionary Tory support against Peel.

While the grant was controversial, and weakened Peel's government, it set a precedent, and within three years, government support was being given to Catholic schools in England.
