= Anti-Maynooth Conference =

The Anti-Maynooth Conference was a gathering hosted in London in May 1845 by Conservatives, evangelical Anglicans and the Protestant Association to campaign against the Maynooth Grant and British state funding of the Roman Catholic Maynooth College, a seminary in Ireland. Opponents of the Maynooth Bill formed a committee and held a conference in the Rotunda, in Dublin.

In England, the Protestant Association set up the Anti-Maynooth Committee composed of Anglicans, Congregationalists, Methodists, and Presbyterians. The Committee collected more than 10,000 petitions, containing a total in excess of 1,200,000 signatures opposing the Maynooth Bill.

The common platform shared by strands of Protestantism was unique, although their reasoning was quite different. Mainstream Anglicans opposed the Maynooth Grant because, in their view, it undermined the Established Church, whereas non-conformists opposed it because they were opposed to all state religious establishments and Evangelicals opposed the bill since it undermined attempts to convert Irish Catholics to the Protestant Faith. The Maynooth Bill was introduced by Sir Robert Peel in April 1845.

Sir Culling Eardley the former Liberal MP served as chairman of the Committee and Conference. Thomas Thompson served as Secretary to the Dublin Anti-Maynooth Committee.

The conference in London between 30 April and 3 May 1845 with more than 1,000 participants from Ireland and Britain in attendance was held in Exeter Hall, London. Active in the campaign against the Maynooth Grant was the Rev. A.S. Thelwall who compiled the minutes of the 1845 meeting.

The 1845 Maynooth Bill (which became the Maynooth College Act 1845 (8 & 9 Vict. c. 25)), was carried by 323 to 176 votes in the House of Commons, and the Maynooth Grant was increased.
