= List of acts of the Parliament of the United Kingdom from 1845 =

This is a complete list of acts of the Parliament of the United Kingdom for the year 1845.

Note that the first parliament of the United Kingdom was held in 1801; parliaments between 1707 and 1800 were either parliaments of Great Britain or of Ireland). For acts passed up until 1707, see the list of acts of the Parliament of England and the list of acts of the Parliament of Scotland. For acts passed from 1707 to 1800, see the list of acts of the Parliament of Great Britain. See also the list of acts of the Parliament of Ireland.

For acts of the devolved parliaments and assemblies in the United Kingdom, see the list of acts of the Scottish Parliament, the list of acts of the Northern Ireland Assembly, and the list of acts and measures of Senedd Cymru; see also the list of acts of the Parliament of Northern Ireland.

The number shown after each act's title is its chapter number. Acts passed before 1963 are cited using this number, preceded by the year(s) of the reign during which the relevant parliamentary session was held; thus the Union with Ireland Act 1800 is cited as "39 & 40 Geo. 3 c. 67", meaning the 67th act passed during the session that started in the 39th year of the reign of George III and which finished in the 40th year of that reign. Note that the modern convention is to use Arabic numerals in citations (thus "41 Geo. 3" rather than "41 Geo. III"). Acts of the last session of the Parliament of Great Britain and the first session of the Parliament of the United Kingdom are both cited as "41 Geo. 3".

Some of these acts have a short title. Some of these acts have never had a short title. Some of these acts have a short title given to them by later acts, such as by the Short Titles Act 1896.

== 8 & 9 Vict. ==
The fifth session of the 14th Parliament of the United Kingdom, which met from 4 February 1845 until 9 August 1845.

=== Public general acts ===
Short title	Citation	Royal assent
Long title
Supply Act 1845 (repealed)	8 & 9 Vict. c. 1	18 March 1845
An Act to apply the Sum of Eight Millions out of the Consolidated Fund to the Service of the Year One thousand eight hundred and forty-five. (Repealed by Statute Law Revision Act 1875 (38 & 39 Vict. c. 66))
Stamps Act 1845 (repealed)	8 & 9 Vict. c. 2	18 March 1845
An Act to continue for Three Years the Stamp Duties granted by an Act of the Fifth and Sixth Years of Her present Majesty (Note: Stamp Duties (Ireland) Act 1842 (5 & 6 Vict. c. 82)) to assimilate the Stamp Duties in Great Britain and Ireland, and to make Regulations for collecting and managing the same, until the Tenth Day of October One thousand eight hundred and forty-five. (Repealed by Statute Law Revision Act 1875 (38 & 39 Vict. c. 66))
Constables near Public Works (Scotland) Act 1845 (repealed)	8 & 9 Vict. c. 3	18 March 1845
An Act for the Appointment of Constables or other Officers for keeping the Peace near public Works in Scotland. (Repealed by Police (Scotland) Act 1857 (20 & 21 Vict. c. 72))
Income Tax Act 1845 (repealed)	8 & 9 Vict. c. 4	5 April 1845
An Act to continue for Three Years the Duties on Profits arising from Property, Professions, Trades, and Offices. (Repealed by Statute Law Revision Act 1875 (38 & 39 Vict. c. 66))
Sugar Duties Act 1845 (repealed)	8 & 9 Vict. c. 5	24 April 1845
An Act for granting to Her Majesty, until the Fifth Day of July One thousand eight hundred and forty-six, certain Duties on Sugar imported into the United Kingdom. (Repealed by Statute Law Revision Act 1861 (24 & 25 Vict. c. 101))
Glass Duties Repeal Act 1845 (repealed)	8 & 9 Vict. c. 6	24 April 1845
An Act to repeal the Duties and Laws of Excise on Glass. (Repealed by Statute Law Revision Act 1875 (38 & 39 Vict. c. 66))
Certain Export Duties Repeal Act 1845 (repealed)	8 & 9 Vict. c. 7	24 April 1845
An Act to repeal the Duties of Customs due upon the Exportation of certain Goods from the United Kingdom. (Repealed by Statute Law Revision Act 1875 (38 & 39 Vict. c. 66))
Mutiny Act 1845 (repealed)	8 & 9 Vict. c. 8	24 April 1845
An Act for punishing Mutiny and Desertion, and for the better Payment of the Army and their Quarters. (Repealed by Statute Law Revision Act 1875 (38 & 39 Vict. c. 66))
Marine Mutiny Act 1845 (repealed)	8 & 9 Vict. c. 9	24 April 1845
An Act for the Regulation of Her Majesty's Royal Marine Forces while on shore. (Repealed by Statute Law Revision Act 1875 (38 & 39 Vict. c. 66))
Bastardy Act 1845 (repealed)	8 & 9 Vict. c. 10	8 May 1845
An Act to make certain Provisions for Proceedings in Bastardy. (Repealed by Affiliation Proceedings Act 1957 (5 & 6 Eliz. 2. c. 55))
Sheriffs (Wales) Act 1845 (repealed)	8 & 9 Vict. c. 11	8 May 1845
An Act for assigning Sheriffs in Wales. (Repealed by Sheriffs Act 1887 (50 & 51 Vict. c. 55))
Customs Act 1845 (repealed)	8 & 9 Vict. c. 12	8 May 1845
An Act to alter and amend certain Duties of Customs. (Repealed by Customs (Repeal) Act 1845 (8 & 9 Vict. c. 84))
Duties on Sugar Act 1845 (repealed)	8 & 9 Vict. c. 13	8 May 1845
An Act to repeal the Duties of Excise on Sugar manufactured in the United Kingdom, and to impose other Duties in lieu thereof. (Repealed by Statute Law Revision Act 1861 (24 & 25 Vict. c. 101))
Passenger Ships Act 1845 (repealed)	8 & 9 Vict. c. 14	8 May 1845
An Act to exempt Ships carrying Passengers to North America from the Obligation of having on board a Physician, Surgeon, or Apothecary. (Repealed by Passengers Act 1849 (12 & 13 Vict. c. 33))
Auctioneers Act 1845	8 & 9 Vict. c. 15	8 May 1845
An Act to repeal the Duties of Excise on Sales by Auction, and to impose a new Duty on the Licence to be taken out by all Auctioneers in the United Kingdom.
Companies Clauses Consolidation Act 1845	8 & 9 Vict. c. 16	8 May 1845
An Act for consolidating in One Act certain Provisions usually inserted in Acts with respect to the Constitution of Companies incorporated for carrying on Undertakings of a public Nature.
Companies Clauses Consolidation (Scotland) Act 1845	8 & 9 Vict. c. 17	8 May 1845
An Act for consolidating in One Act certain provisions usually inserted in Acts with respect to the Constitution of Companies incorporated for carrying on Undertakings of a public Nature in Scotland.
Lands Clauses Consolidation Act 1845 or the Land Clauses Consolidation Act 1845	8 & 9 Vict. c. 18	8 May 1845
An Act for consolidating in one Act certain provisions usually inserted in Acts authorizing the taking of lands for undertakings of a public nature.
Lands Clauses Consolidation (Scotland) Act 1845	8 & 9 Vict. c. 19	8 May 1845
An Act for consolidating in one Act certain provisions usually inserted in Acts authorizing the taking of lands for undertakings of a public nature in Scotland.
Railways Clauses Consolidation Act 1845 or the Railway Clauses Consolidation Act 1845	8 & 9 Vict. c. 20	8 May 1845
An Act for consolidating in One Act certain Provisions usually inserted in Acts authorizing the making of Railways.
Manchester Stipendiary Magistrate Act 1845 (repealed)	8 & 9 Vict. c. 21	8 May 1845
An Act to amend an Act of the Fifty-third of George the Third, (Note: Manchester Stipendiary Magistrate Act 1813 (53 Geo. 3. c. 72)) for appointing a Stipendiary Magistrate to the Townships of Manchester and Salford; and to provide a Stipendiary Magistrate for the Division of Manchester. (Repealed by Manchester Division Stipendiary Justice Act 1854 (17 & 18 Vict. c. 20))
Fisher Lane, Greenwich Act 1845	8 & 9 Vict. c. 22	8 May 1845
An Act to enable the Commissioners of Greenwich Hospital to widen and improve Fisher Lane, in Greenwich; and for other Purposes connected with the estates of the said Commissioners.
Exchequer Bills Act 1845 (repealed)	8 & 9 Vict. c. 23	20 May 1845
An Act for raising the Sum of Nine millions three hundred and seventy-nine thousand six hundred Pounds by Exchequer Bills for the Service of the Year One thousand eight hundred and forty-five. (Repealed by Statute Law Revision Act 1875 (38 & 39 Vict. c. 66))
Indemnity Act 1845 (repealed)	8 & 9 Vict. c. 24	30 June 1845
An Act to indemnify such Persons in the United Kingdom as have omitted to qualify themselves for Offices and Employments, and to extend the Time limited for those Purposes respectively until the Twenty-fifth Day of March One thousand eight hundred and forty-six. (Repealed by Promissory Oaths Act 1871 (34 & 35 Vict. c. 48))
Maynooth College Act 1845 (repealed)	8 & 9 Vict. c. 25	30 June 1845
An Act to amend Two Acts passed in Ireland (Note: Maynooth College Act 1795 (35 Geo. 3. c. 21 (I))) (Note: Maynooth College Act 1800 (40 Geo. 3. c. 85 (I))) for the better Education of Persons professing the Roman Catholic Religion, and for the better Government of the College established at Maynooth for the Education of such Persons, and also an Act passed in the Parliament of the United Kingdom (Note: Maynooth Academy Act 1808 (48 Geo. 3. c. cxlv)) for amending the said Two Acts. (Repealed by Statute Law (Repeals) Act 2013 (c. 2))
Trout (Scotland) Act 1845 (repealed)	8 & 9 Vict. c. 26	30 June 1845
An Act to prevent fishing for Trout or other Fresh-water Fish by Nets in the Rivers and Waters in Scotland. (Repealed by Salmon and Freshwater Fisheries (Protection) (Scotland) Act 1951 (14 & 15 Geo. 6. c. 26))
Military Savings Bank Act 1845 (repealed)	8 & 9 Vict. c. 27	30 June 1845
An Act to amend the Act (Note: Military Savings Banks Act 1842 (5 & 6 Vict. c. 71)) to establish Military Savings Banks. (Repealed by Military Savings Banks Act 1859 (22 & 23 Vict. c. 20))
Canal Tolls Act 1845 (repealed)	8 & 9 Vict. c. 28	30 June 1845
An Act to empower Canal Companies and the Commissioners of Navigable Rivers to vary their Tolls, Rates, and Charges on different parts of their Navigations. (Repealed for England and Wales and Scotland by Transport Act 1962 (10 & 11 Eliz. 2. c. 46) and for Northern Ireland by Statute Law Revision Act 1875 (38 & 39 Vict. c. 66), Statute Law Revision Act 1891 (54 & 55 Vict. c. 67) and Statute Law Revision Act (Northern Ireland) 1954 (c. 35 (N.I.)))
Print Works Act 1845 (repealed)	8 & 9 Vict. c. 29	30 June 1845
An Act to regulate the Labour of Children, young Persons, and Women, in Print Works. (Repealed by Factory and Workshop Act 1870 (33 & 34 Vict. c. 62))
Judicial Committee Act 1845 (repealed)	8 & 9 Vict. c. 30	30 June 1845
An Act to amend an Act passed in the Third and Fourth Years of the Reign of His late Majesty King William the Fourth, intituled "An Act for the better Administration of Justice in His Majesty's Privy Council." (Note: Judicial Committee Act 1833 (3 & 4 Will. 4. c. 41)) (Repealed by Statute Law Revision Act 1891 (54 & 55 Vict. c. 67))
Heritable Securities (Scotland) Act 1845 (repealed)	8 & 9 Vict. c. 31	30 June 1845
An Act to facilitate the Transmission and Extinction of Heritable Securities for Debt in Scotland. (Repealed by Titles to Land Consolidation (Scotland) Act 1868 (31 & 32 Vict. c. 101))
Mortgage of County Rates, Middlesex Act 1845 (repealed)	8 & 9 Vict. c. 32	30 June 1845
An Act to alter and amend the Laws enabling Justices of the Peace in certain Cases to borrow Money on Mortgage of the County Rates, so far as the same relate to the County of Middlesex. (Repealed by Statute Law Revision Act 1891 (54 & 55 Vict. c. 67))
Railways Clauses Consolidation (Scotland) Act 1845	8 & 9 Vict. c. 33	21 July 1845
An Act for consolidating in One Act certain Provisions usually inserted in Acts authorizing the making of Railways in Scotland.
Seal Office in Courts of Queen's Bench and Common Pleas Act 1845 (repealed)	8 & 9 Vict. c. 34	21 July 1845
An Act for abolishing the separate Seal Office of the Courts of Queen's Bench and Common Pleas. (Repealed by Statute Law Revision (No. 2) Act 1893 (56 & 57 Vict. c. 54))
Infeftment Act 1845 (repealed)	8 & 9 Vict. c. 35	21 July 1845
An Act to simplify the Form and diminish the Expence of obtaining Infeftment in Heritable Property in Scotland. (Repealed by Abolition of Feudal Tenure etc. (Scotland) Act 2000 (asp 5))
Assessed Taxes Act 1845 (repealed)	8 & 9 Vict. c. 36	21 July 1845
An Act to continue for Five Years and to amend the Acts for authorizing a Composition for Assessed Taxes. (Repealed by Revenue Act 1869 (32 & 33 Vict. c. 14))
Bankers (Ireland) Act 1845	8 & 9 Vict. c. 37	21 July 1845
An Act to regulate the Issue of Bank Notes in Ireland, and to regulate the Repayment of certain Sums advanced by the Governor and Company of the Bank of Ireland for the Public Service.
Bank Notes (Scotland) Act 1845	8 & 9 Vict. c. 38	21 July 1845
An Act to regulate the Issue of Bank Notes in Scotland.
Wages Arrestment (Scotland) Act 1845 (repealed)	8 & 9 Vict. c. 39	21 July 1845
An Act to amend the Law of Arrestment of Wages in Scotland. (Repealed by Law Reform (Miscellaneous Provisions) (Scotland) Act 1966 (c. 19))
Parish Schoolmasters (Scotland) Act 1845 (repealed)	8 & 9 Vict. c. 40	21 July 1845
An Act for amending an Act (Note: Parochial Schools (Scotland) Act 1803 (43 Geo. 3. c. 54)) for making Provision for Parish Schoolmasters in Scotland. (Repealed by Statute Law Revision Act 1875 (38 & 39 Vict. c. 66))
Highways, etc. (Scotland) Act 1845 (repealed)	8 & 9 Vict. c. 41	21 July 1845
An Act for amending the Laws concerning Highways, Bridges, and Ferries in Scotland, and the making and maintaining thereof by Statute Service, and by the Conversion of Statute Service into Money. (Repealed by Statute Law Revision Act 1891 (54 & 55 Vict. c. 67))
Canal Carriers Act 1845	8 & 9 Vict. c. 42	21 July 1845
An Act to enable Canal Companies to become Carriers of Goods upon their Canals.
Museums Act 1845 or the Museums of Art Act 1845 or the Museums of Art in Boroughs Act 1845 (repealed)	8 & 9 Vict. c. 43	21 July 1845
An Act for encouraging the Establishment of Museums in Large Towns. (Repealed by Public Libraries Act 1850 (13 & 14 Vict. c. 65))
Protection of Works of Art, etc. Act 1845 (repealed)	8 & 9 Vict. c. 44	21 July 1845
An Act for the better Protection of Works of Art, and Scientific and Literary Collections. (Repealed by Criminal Statutes Repeal Act 1861 (24 & 25 Vict. c. 95))
Timber Ships Act 1845 (repealed)	8 & 9 Vict. c. 45	21 July 1845
An Act to make perpetual and amend an Act of the Fifth and Sixth Years (Note: Timber Ships, America Act 1842 (5 & 6 Vict. c. 17)) of Her present Majesty, for preventing Ships clearing out from any Port in British North America or in the Settlement of Honduras from loading any Part of their Cargo of Timber upon Deck. (Repealed by Customs (Repeal) Act 1845 (8 & 9 Vict. c. 84))
Special Constables (Ireland) Act 1845 (repealed)	8 & 9 Vict. c. 46	21 July 1845
An Act for the Appointment of additional Constables for keeping the Peace near Public Works in Ireland. (Repealed by Statute Law Revision Act 1875 (38 & 39 Vict. c. 66), Statute Law Revision Act 1891 (54 & 55 Vict. c. 67) and Statute Law Revision Act (Northern Ireland) 1954 (c. 35 (N.I.)))
Dog Stealing Act 1845 or Bishop's Act (repealed)	8 & 9 Vict. c. 47	21 July 1845
An Act for the further Prevention of the Offence of Dog Stealing. (Repealed by Criminal Statutes Repeal Act 1861 (24 & 25 Vict. c. 95))
Bankruptcy Act 1845 (repealed)	8 & 9 Vict. c. 48	21 July 1845
An Act to substitute a Declaration for an Oath in Cases of Bankruptcy. (Repealed for England and Wales by Bankrupt Law Consolidation Act 1849 (12 & 13 Vict. c. 106), for Ireland by Irish Bankrupt and Insolvent Act 1857 (20 & 21 Vict. c. 60) and for Scotland by Statute Law Revision Act 1861 (24 & 25 Vict. c. 101))
Sir H. Pottinger's Annuity Act 1845 (repealed)	8 & 9 Vict. c. 49	21 July 1845
An Act to settle an Annuity (Note: An annuity of £1,500 a year.) on Sir Henry Pottinger Baronet, in consideration of his eminent Services. (Repealed by Statute Law Revision Act 1875 (38 & 39 Vict. c. 66))
West India Island Relief Act 1845 (repealed)	8 & 9 Vict. c. 50	21 July 1845
An Act to facilitate the Recovery of Loans made by the West India Belief Commissioner. (Repealed by West India Loan Act 1879 (42 & 43 Vict. c. 16))
Ecclesiastical Patronage (Ireland) Act 1845 (repealed)	8 & 9 Vict. c. 51	31 July 1845
An Act to enable Archbishops and Bishops in Ireland to charge their Sees with the Costs incurred by them in defence of their Bights of Patronage, in certain Cases; and also to enable Tenants for Life and other Persons having limited Interests in Estates in Ireland to charge said Estates with the Costs incurred by them in asserting their Eights to Ecclesiastical Patronage, in certain Cases. (Repealed by Statute Law Revision (No. 2) Act 1893 (56 & 57 Vict. c. 54))
Municipal Offices Act 1845 (repealed)	8 & 9 Vict. c. 52	31 July 1845
An Act for the Belief of Persons of the Jewish Religion elected to Municipal Offices. (Repealed by Promissory Oaths Act 1871 (34 & 35 Vict. c. 48))
Turnpike Acts Continuance Act 1845 (repealed)	8 & 9 Vict. c. 53	31 July 1845
An Act to continue to the First Day of October One thousand eight hundred and forty-six, and to the End of the then next Session of Parliament, certain Turnpike Acts. (Repealed by Statute Law Revision Act 1875 (38 & 39 Vict. c. 66))
Parishes (Ireland) Act 1845	8 & 9 Vict. c. 54	31 July 1845
An Act to amend the Laws in force in Ireland for Unions and Divisions of Parishes; for the Settlement of the Patronage thereof, and the Celebration of Marriages in the same.
Unlawful Oaths (Ireland) Act 1845 or the Unlawful Oaths Amendment and Continuance Act 1845 or the Unlawful Oaths Act 1845 (repealed)	8 & 9 Vict. c. 55	31 July 1845
An Act to continue for Two Years, and to the End of the then next Session of Parliament, and to amend, an Act of the Second and Third Years of Her present Majesty, (Note: Unlawful Societies (Ireland) Act 1839 (2 & 3 Vict. c. 74)) intituled "An Act to extend and render more effectual for Five Years an Act passed in the Fourth Year of His late Majesty George the Fourth, (Note: Unlawful Oaths (Ireland) Act 1823 (4 Geo. 4. c. 87)) to amend an Act passed in the Fiftieth Year of His Majesty George the Third, (Note: Unlawful Oaths (Ireland) Act 1810 (50 Geo. 3. c. 102)) for preventing the administering and taking unlawful Oaths in Ireland." (Repealed by Unlawful Oaths (Ireland) Act 1856 (19 & 20 Vict. c. 78))
Land Drainage Act 1845 (repealed)	8 & 9 Vict. c. 56	31 July 1845
An Act to alter and amend an Act passed in the Third and Fourth Year of the Reign of Her present Majesty Queen Victoria, intituled "An Act to enable the Owners of Settled Estates to defray the Expences of draining the same by way of Mortgage." (Note: Settled Estates Drainage Act 1840 (3 & 4 Vict. c. 55)) (Repealed by Statute Law (Repeals) Act 1971 (c. 52))
Art Unions Indemnity Act 1845 (repealed)	8 & 9 Vict. c. 57	31 July 1845
An Act to extend the Indemnify of Members of Art Unions against certain Penalties. (Repealed by Statute Law Revision Act 1875 (38 & 39 Vict. c. 66))
Militia Ballots Suspension Act 1845 (repealed)	8 & 9 Vict. c. 58	31 July 1845
An Act to suspend until the First Day of October One thousand eight hundred and forty-six the making of Lists and the Ballots and Enrolments for the Militia of the United Kingdom. (Repealed by Statute Law Revision Act 1875 (38 & 39 Vict. c. 66))
Highway Rates Act 1845 (repealed)	8 & 9 Vict. c. 59	31 July 1845
An Act to continue to the First Day of October One thousand eight hundred and forty-six, and to the End of the then next Session of Parliament, an Act (Note: Application of Highway Rates to Turnpikes Act 1841 (4 & 5 Vict. c. 59)) for authorizing the Application of Highway Rates to Turnpike Roads. (Repealed by Statute Law Revision Act 1875 (38 & 39 Vict. c. 66))
Loan Societies Act 1845 (repealed)	8 & 9 Vict. c. 60	31 July 1845
An Act to continue to the First Day of October One thousand eight hundred and forty-six, and to the End of the then next Session of Parliament, the Act (Note: Loan Societies Act 1840 (3 & 4 Vict. c. 110)) to amend the Laws relating to Loan Societies. (Repealed by Statute Law Revision Act 1875 (38 & 39 Vict. c. 66))
Turnpike Trusts (South Wales) Act 1845 (repealed)	8 & 9 Vict. c. 61	31 July 1845
An Act to make certain further Provisions for the Consolidation of Turnpike Trusts in South Wales. (Repealed by Statute Law (Repeals) Act 1993 (c. 50))
National Debt Act 1845 (repealed)	8 & 9 Vict. c. 62	31 July 1845
An Act to make further Provisions as to Stock and Dividends unclaimed. (Repealed by Statute Law Revision Act 1870 (33 & 34 Vict. c. 69))
Geological Survey Act 1845	8 & 9 Vict. c. 63	31 July 1845
An Act to facilitate the Completion of a Geological Survey of Great Britain and Ireland, under the Direction of the First Commissioner for the time being of Her Majesty's Woods and Works.
Spirits (Ireland) Act 1845 (repealed)	8 & 9 Vict. c. 64	31 July 1845
An Act to amend certain Regulations respecting the Retail of Spirits in Ireland. (Repealed by Licensing Act (Northern Ireland) 1971 (c. 13 (N.I.)))
Duties on Spirits Act 1845 (repealed)	8 & 9 Vict. c. 65	31 July 1845
An Act to determine the countervailing Duties payable on Spirits of the Nature of plain British Sprits, the Manufacture of Guernsey, Jersey, Alderney, or Sark, imported into the United Kingdom; and to prohibit the Importation of rectified or compound Spirits from the said Islands. (Repealed by Statute Law Revision Act 1875 (38 & 39 Vict. c. 66))
Queen's Colleges (Ireland) (No. 2) Act 1845 or the Queen's Colleges (Ireland) Act 1845 or the Universities Ireland Act 1845 (repealed)	8 & 9 Vict. c. 66	31 July 1845
An Act to enable Her Majesty to endow new Colleges for the Advancement of Learning in Ireland. (Repealed by Irish Universities Act 1908 (8 Edw. 7. c. 38))
Juries (Ireland) Act 1845 (repealed)	8 & 9 Vict. c. 67	31 July 1845
An Act for making further Regulations for more effectually securing the Correctness of the Jurors Books in Ireland. (Repealed by Juries Act (Ireland) 1871 (34 & 35 Vict. c. 65))
Bail in Error Act 1845 (repealed)	8 & 9 Vict. c. 68	31 July 1845
An Act to the Execution of Judgment for Misdemeanors upon giving Bail in Error. (Repealed by Statute Law Revision Act 1891 (54 & 55 Vict. c. 67))
Drainage (Ireland) Act 1845 (repealed)	8 & 9 Vict. c. 69	31 July 1845
An Act to amend an Act of the Sixth Year of Her present Majesty, for promoting the Drainage of Lands, and Improvement of Navigation and Water Power in connexion with such Drainage, in Ireland. (Repealed by Erne Drainage and Development Act (Northern Ireland) 1950 (c. 15 (N.I.)))
Church Building Act 1845 (repealed)	8 & 9 Vict. c. 70	31 July 1845
An Act for the further Amendment of the Church Building Acts. (Repealed by Statute Law (Repeals) Act 1974 (c. 22))
Highway Act 1845 (repealed)	8 & 9 Vict. c. 71	31 July 1845
An Act to extend certain Provisions in the Act for consolidating and amending the Laws relating to Highways in England. (Note: Highway Act 1835 (5 & 6 Will. 4. c. 50)) (Repealed by Local Government Act 1933 (23 & 24 Geo. 5. c. 51))
Rothwell Gaol Act 1845 (repealed)	8 & 9 Vict. c. 72	31 July 1845
An Act to reader it unnecessary to keep up Rothwell Gaol, in the Honor of Pontefract, in the West Hiding of the County of York. (Repealed by Statute Law (Repeals) Act 1986 (c. 12))
Shrewsbury and Holyhead Road Act 1845 (repealed)	8 & 9 Vict. c. 73	31 July 1845
An Act to enable the Commissioners of Her Majesty's Woods and Works to apply certain Monies now in their Hands towards discharging the Incumbrances affecting the Shrewsbury and Holyhead Road. (Repealed by Statute Law Revision Act 1875 (38 & 39 Vict. c. 66))
Lotteries Act 1845 (repealed)	8 & 9 Vict. c. 74	31 July 1845
An Act to amend an Act of the Seventh Year of King William the Fourth, for preventing the advertising of Foreign and other illegal Lotteries; and to discontinue certain Actions commenced under the Provisions of the said Act. (Repealed by Betting and Lotteries Act 1934 (24 & 25 Geo. 5. c. 58) and for Northern Ireland by Betting and Lotteries Act (Northern Ireland) 1957 (c. 19 (N.I.)))
Libel Act 1845	8 & 9 Vict. c. 75	31 July 1845
An Act to amend an Act passed in the Session of Parliament held in the Sixth and Seventh Years of the Reign of Her present Majesty, intituled "An Act to amend the Law respecting defamatory Words and Libel." (Note: Libel Act 1843 (6 & 7 Vict. c. 96))
Revenue Act 1845 (repealed)	8 & 9 Vict. c. 76	4 August 1845
An Act to increase the Stamp Duty on Licences to Appraisers; to reduce the Stamp Duties on Registry Searches in Ireland; to amend the Law relating to the Duties on Legacies; and also to amend an Act of the last Session of Parliament, (Note: Bank Charter Act 1844 (7 & 8 Vict. c. 32)) for regulating the Issue of Bank Notes in England. (Repealed by Statute Law (Repeals) Act 1981 (c. 19))
Hosiery Act 1845 (repealed)	8 & 9 Vict. c. 77	4 August 1845
An Act to make further Regulations respecting the Tickets of Work to be delivered to Persons employed in the Manufacture of Hosiery, in certain Cases. (Repealed by Statute Law Revision Act 1959 (7 & 8 Eliz. 2. c. 68))
Abolition of Offices in Courts of Law Act 1845 (repealed)	8 & 9 Vict. c. 78	4 August 1845
An Act to provide for the Payment of Compensation Allowances to certain Persons connected with the Courts of Law in England, for Loss of Fees and Emoluments. (Repealed by Statute Law Revision Act 1875 (38 & 39 Vict. c. 66))
Poor Rates Act 1845 (repealed)	8 & 9 Vict. c. 79	4 August 1845
An Act to continue until the First Day of October One thousand eight hundred and forty-six, and to the End of the then Session of Parliament, the Exemption of Inhabitants of Parishes, Townships, and Villages from Liability to be rated as such, in respect of Stock in Trade or other Property, to the Relief of the Poor. (Repealed by Statute Law Revision Act 1875 (38 & 39 Vict. c. 66))
Quarter Sessions (Ireland) Act 1845 (repealed)	8 & 9 Vict. c. 80	4 August 1845
An Act for regulating the Criminal Jurisdiction of Assistant Barristers as to certain Counties of Cities and Counties of Towns in Ireland. (Repealed by Statute Law Revision Act 1875 (38 & 39 Vict. c. 66), Statute Law Revision Act 1891 (54 & 55 Vict. c. 67) and County Courts Act (Northern Ireland) 1959 (c. 25 (N.I.)))
Grand Jury (Dublin) Act 1845 or the Dublin Grand Jury Act 1845	8 & 9 Vict. c. 81	4 August 1845
An Act io amend an Act of the last Session, (Note: County Dublin Grand Jury Act 1844 (7 & 8 Vict. c. 106)) for consolidating and amending the Laws for the Regulation of Grand Jury Presentments in the County of Dublin.
Militia Pay Act 1845 (repealed)	8 & 9 Vict. c. 82	4 August 1845
An Act to defray until the First Day of August One thousand eight hundred and forty-six the Charge of the Pay, Clothing and contingent and other Expences of the Disembodied Militia in Great Britain and Ireland; to grant Allowances in certain Cases to Subaltern Officers, Adjutants, Paymasters, Quartermasters, Surgeons, Assistant Surgeons, Surgeons Mates, and Serjeant Majors of the Militia; and to authorize the Employment of the Non-commissioned Officers. (Repealed by Statute Law Revision Act 1875 (38 & 39 Vict. c. 66))
Poor Law (Scotland) Act 1845 (repealed)	8 & 9 Vict. c. 83	4 August 1845
An Act for the Amendment and better Administration of the Laws relating to the Relief of the Poor in Scotland. (Repealed by National Assistance Act 1948 (11 & 12 Geo. 6. c. 29))
Customs (Repeal) Act 1845 (repealed)	8 & 9 Vict. c. 84	4 August 1845
An Act to repeal the several Laws relating to the Customs. (Repealed by Statute Law Revision Act 1875 (38 & 39 Vict. c. 66))
Commissioners of Customs Act 1845 (repealed)	8 & 9 Vict. c. 85	4 August 1845
An Act for the Management of the Customs. (Repealed by Customs Consolidation Act 1853 (16 & 17 Vict. c. 107) and Customs Consolidation Act 1876 (39 & 40 Vict. c. 36))
Customs (No. 3) Act 1845 (repealed)	8 & 9 Vict. c. 86	4 August 1845
An Act for the general Regulation of the Customs. (Repealed by Customs Consolidation Act 1853 (16 & 17 Vict. c. 107), Merchant Shipping Repeal Act 1854 (17 & 18 Vict. c. 120) and Local Government Board's Provisional Order Confirmation (No. 19) Act 1894 (57 & 58 Vict. c. cxxvii))
Prevention of Smuggling Act 1845 (repealed)	8 & 9 Vict. c. 87	4 August 1845
An Act for the Prevention of Smuggling. (Repealed by Statute Law Revision Act 1875 (38 & 39 Vict. c. 66))
Shipping, etc. Act 1845 (repealed)	8 & 9 Vict. c. 88	4 August 1845
An Act for the Encouragement of British Shipping and Navigation. (Repealed by Navigation Act 1849 (12 & 13 Vict. c. 29))
Registering of British Vessels Act 1845 (repealed)	8 & 9 Vict. c. 89	4 August 1845
An Act for the registering of British Vessels. (Repealed by Merchant Shipping Repeal Act 1854 (17 & 18 Vict. c. 120))
Duties of Customs Act 1845 (repealed)	8 & 9 Vict. c. 90	4 August 1845
An Act for granting Duties of Customs. (Repealed by Customs Consolidation Act 1853 (16 & 17 Vict. c. 107))
Warehousing of Goods Act 1845 (repealed)	8 & 9 Vict. c. 91	4 August 1845
An Act for the warehousing of Goods. (Repealed by Customs Consolidation Act 1853 (16 & 17 Vict. c. 107) and Merchant Shipping Act Amendment Act 1862 (25 & 26 Vict. c. 63))
Customs (No. 4) Act 1845 (repealed)	8 & 9 Vict. c. 92	4 August 1845
An Act to grant certain Bounties and Allowances of Customs. (Repealed by Customs Consolidation Act 1853 (16 & 17 Vict. c. 107))
Trade of British Possessions Act 1845 (repealed)	8 & 9 Vict. c. 93	4 August 1845
An Act to regulate the Trade of British Possessions abroad. (Repealed by Customs Consolidation Act 1853 (16 & 17 Vict. c. 107))
Isle of Man Trade Act 1845 (repealed)	8 & 9 Vict. c. 94	4 August 1845
An Act for the regulating the Trade of the Isle of Man. (Repealed by Customs Consolidation Act 1853 (16 & 17 Vict. c. 107))
Waste Lands (Van Diemen's Land) Act 1845 (repealed)	8 & 9 Vict. c. 95	4 August 1845
An Act to exempt Van Diemen's Land from the Provisions of an Act, intituled "An Act for regulating the Sale of Waste Land belonging to the Crown in the Australian Colonies." (Note: Australian Colonies Waste Lands Act 1842 (5 & 6 Vict. c. 36)) (Repealed by Statute Law Revision Act 1875 (38 & 39 Vict. c. 66))
Railway (Sales and Leases) Act 1845 (repealed)	8 & 9 Vict. c. 96	4 August 1845
An Act to restrict the Powers of selling or leasing Railways contained in certain Acts of Parliament relating to such Railways. (Repealed for England and Wales and Scotland by Transport Act 1962 (10 & 11 Eliz. 2. c. 46) and for Northern Ireland by Statute Law Revision Act 1891 (54 & 55 Vict. c. 67) and Repeal of Unnecessary Laws Act (Northern Ireland) 1953 (c. 5 (N.I.)))
Public Funds Act 1845 (repealed)	8 & 9 Vict. c. 97	4 August 1845
An Act to amend the Law respecting Testamentary Dispositions of Property in the Public Funds, and to authorize the Payment of Dividends on Letters of Attorney in certain Cases. (Repealed by Statute Law Revision Act 1870 (33 & 34 Vict. c. 69))
Joint Stock Companies (Ireland) Act 1845 (repealed)	8 & 9 Vict. c. 98	4 August 1845
An Act for facilitating the winding up the Affairs of Joint Stock Companies in Ireland unable to meet their pecuniary Engagements. (Repealed by Companies Act 1862 (25 & 26 Vict. c. 89))
Crown Lands Act 1845 (repealed)	8 & 9 Vict. c. 99	4 August 1845
An Act to amend an Act of the Tenth Year of His late Majesty King George the Fourth, (Note: Crown Lands Act 1829 (10 Geo. 4. c. 50)) for consolidating and amending the Laws relating to the Management and Improvement of His Majesty's Woods, Forests, Parks, and Chases; and for other Purposes relating to the said Land Revenue. (Repealed by Crown Estate Act 1961 (9 & 10 Eliz. 2. c. 55))
Lunacy Act 1845 or the Lunatics Act 1845 (repealed)	8 & 9 Vict. c. 100	4 August 1845
An Act for the Regulation of the Care and Treatment of Lunatics. (Repealed by Lunacy Act 1890 (53 & 54 Vict. c. 5))
Coal Duty, London Act 1845 (repealed)	8 & 9 Vict. c. 101	4 August 1845
An Act to continue until the Fifth Day of July One thousand eight hundred and sixty-two the Acts for regulating the Vend and Delivery of Coals in London and Westminster, and in certain Parts of the adjacent Counties; and to alter and amend the said Acts. (Repealed by Statute Law Revision (No. 2) Act 1893 (56 & 57 Vict. c. 54))
Usury Act 1845 (repealed)	8 & 9 Vict. c. 102	4 August 1845
An Act to continue until the First Day of January One thousand eight hundred and fifty-one an Act (Note: Usury Act 1839 (2 & 3 Vict. c. 37)) for exempting certain Bills of Exchange and Promissory Notes from the Operation of the Laws relating to Usury. (Repealed by Statute Law Revision Act 1875 (38 & 39 Vict. c. 66))
Bonded Corn Act 1845 (repealed)	8 & 9 Vict. c. 103	4 August 1845
An Act to continue until the Thirty-first Day of August One thousand eight hundred and forty-eight, and to the End of the next Session of Parliament, and to amend, an Act of the Fifth and Sixth Years of Her present Majesty, (Note: Bonded Corn Act 1842 (5 & 6 Vict. c. 92)) for permitting Wheat to be delivered from the Warehouse or the Vessel Duty-free, upon the previous Substitution of an equivalent Quantity of Flour or Biscuit in the Warehouse. (Repealed by Statute Law Revision Act 1875 (38 & 39 Vict. c. 66))
Darby Court, Westminster Act 1845 (repealed)	8 & 9 Vict. c. 104	4 August 1845
An Act to empower the Commissioners of Her Majesty's Woods to appropriate to Building Purposes the Area of Darby Court, in the Parish of Saint James Westminster. (Repealed by Statute Law (Repeals) Act 1978 (c. 45))
Court of Chancery Act 1845 (repealed)	8 & 9 Vict. c. 105	4 August 1845
An Act for amending certain Acts of the Fourth and Fifth Years of the Reign of Her Majesty, (Note: Court of Chancery (No. 1) Act 1841 (4 & 5 Vict. c. 52)) for facilitating the Administration of Justice in the Court of Chancery; and for providing for the Discharge of the Duties of the Subpœna Office after the Death, Resignation, or Removal of the present Patentee of that Office. (Repealed by Statute Law Revision Act 1875 (38 & 39 Vict. c. 66))
Real Property Act 1845 (repealed)	8 & 9 Vict. c. 106	4 August 1845
An Act to amend the Law of Real property. (Repealed by Statute Law Revision Act 1875 (38 & 39 Vict. c. 66), Law of Property (Amendment) Act 1924 (15 & 16 Geo. 5. c. 5) and Law of Property Act 1925 (15 & 16 Geo. 5. c. 20))
Central Criminal Lunatic Asylum (Ireland) Act 1845 (repealed)	8 & 9 Vict. c. 107	8 August 1845
An Act for the Establishment of a Central Asylum for Insane Persons charged with Offences in Ireland; and to amend the Act (Note: Criminal Lunatics (Ireland) Act 1838 (1 & 2 Vict. c. 27)) relating to the Prevention of Offences by Insane Persons, and the Acts respecting Asylums for the Insane Poor, in Ireland; and for appropriating the Lunatic Asylum in the City of Cork to the Purposes of a District Lunatic Asylum. (Repealed by Mental Health Act (Northern Ireland) 1961 (c. 15 (N.I.)))
Fisheries (Ireland) Act 1845 (repealed)	8 & 9 Vict. c. 108	8 August 1845
An Act for the further Amendment of an Act of the Sixth Year of Her present Majesty, (Note: Fisheries (Ireland) Act 1842 (5 & 6 Vict. c. 106)) for regulating the Irish Fisheries. (Repealed by Statute Law Revision Act 1891 (54 & 55 Vict. c. 67), Fisheries Act (Northern Ireland) 1966 (c. 17 (N.I.)) and Criminal Injuries to Persons (Compensation) Act (Northern Ireland) 1968 (c. 9 (N.I.)))
Gaming Act 1845 (repealed)	8 & 9 Vict. c. 109	8 August 1845
An Act to amend the Law concerning Games and Wagers. (Repealed by Gambling Act 2005 (c. 19))
Borough and Watch Rates Act 1845 (repealed)	8 & 9 Vict. c. 110	8 August 1845
An Act for the better collecting Borough and Watch Bates in certain Places. (Repealed by Municipal Corporations Act 1882 (45 & 46 Vict. c. 50))
County Rates Act 1845 (repealed)	8 & 9 Vict. c. 111	8 August 1845
An Act to amend the Laws relating to the assessing of County Bates. (Repealed by County Rates Act 1852 (15 & 16 Vict. c. 81))
Satisfied Terms Act 1845 (repealed)	8 & 9 Vict. c. 112	8 August 1845
An Act to render the Assignment of satisfied Tends unnecessary. (Repealed by Law of Property Act 1925 (15 & 16 Geo. 5. c. 20))
Evidence Act 1845	8 & 9 Vict. c. 113	8 August 1845
An Act to facilitate the Admission in Evidence of certain official and other Documents.
Gaol Fees Abolition Act 1845 (repealed)	8 & 9 Vict. c. 114	8 August 1845
An Act for the Abolition of certain Fees in Criminal Proceedings. (Repealed by Statute Law Revision Act 1891 (54 & 55 Vict. c. 67) and Statute Law Revision Act 1953 (2 & 3 Eliz. 2. c. 5))
Chancery Taxing Master (Ireland) Act 1845 (repealed)	8 & 9 Vict. c. 115	8 August 1845
An Act for the Appointment of a Taxing Master for the High Court of Chancery in Ireland. (Repealed by Judicature (Northern Ireland) Act 1978 (c. 23))
Merchant Seaman Act 1845 (repealed)	8 & 9 Vict. c. 116	8 August 1845
An Act for the Protection of Seamen entering on board Merchant Ships. (Repealed by Merchant Shipping Repeal Act 1854 (17 & 18 Vict. c. 120))
Poor Removal Act 1845 (repealed)	8 & 9 Vict. c. 117	8 August 1845
An Act to amend the Laws relating to the Removal of poor Persona born in Scotland, Ireland, the Islands of Man, Scilly, Jersey, or Guernsey, and chargeable in England. (Repealed for England and Wales and Scotland by National Assistance Act 1948 (11 & 12 Geo. 6. c. 29), for Northern Ireland by Statute Law Revision Act (Northern Ireland) 1954 (c. 35 (N.I.)) and for the Isle of Man by Statute Law Revision (Isle of Man) Act 1991 (c. 61))
Inclosure Act 1845 or the General Inclosure Act 1845	8 & 9 Vict. c. 118	8 August 1845
An Act to facilitate the Inclosure and Improvement of Commons and Lands held in common, the Exchange of Lands, and the Division of intermixed Lands; to provide Remedies for defective or incomplete Executions, and for the Non-execution of the Powers of general and local Inclosure Acts; and to provide for the Revival of such Powers in certain cases.
Conveyance of Real Property Act 1845 (repealed)	8 & 9 Vict. c. 119	8 August 1845
An Act to facilitate the Conveyance of Real Property. (Repealed by Conveyancing Act 1881 (44 & 45 Vict. c. 41))
Extradition Act 1845 (repealed)	8 & 9 Vict. c. 120	8 August 1845
An Act for facilitating Execution of the Treaties with France and the United States of America for the Apprehension of certain Offenders. (Repealed by Extradition Act 1870 (33 & 34 Vict. c. 52))
Counties of Drogheda and Meath Act 1845 or the Local Government (Drogheda and Meath) Act 1845	8 & 9 Vict. c. 121	8 August 1845
An Act to amend and explain certain Provisions of an Act of the Third and Fourth Years of Her present Majesty, (Note: Counties and Boroughs (Ireland) Act 1840 (3 & 4 Vict. c. 109)) for annexing certain Parts of certain Counties of Cities to adjoining Counties, for making further Provision for Compensation of Officers in Boroughs, for limiting the Borough Rate, and for continuing an Act (Note: Municipal Corporations (Ireland) Act 1836 (6 & 7 Will. 4. c. 100)) to restrain the Alienation of Corporate Property in Ireland.
Slave Trade (Brazil) Act 1845 or the Aberdeen Act (repealed)	8 & 9 Vict. c. 122	8 August 1845
An Act to amend an Act, intituled "An Act to carry into execution a Convention between His Majesty and the Emperor of Brazil, for the Regulation and final Abolition of the African Slave Trade." (Note: Slave Trade (Convention with Brazil) Act 1827 (7 & 8 Geo. 4. c. 74)) (Repealed by Brazilian Slave Trade Repeal Act 1869 (32 & 33 Vict. c. 2))
Naval Medical Supplemental Fund Society Act 1845 (repealed)	8 & 9 Vict. c. 123	8 August 1845
An Act to authorize until the End of the next Session of Parliament an Alteration of the Annuities and Premiums of the Naval Medical Supplemental Fund Society. (Repealed by Statute Law Revision Act 1875 (38 & 39 Vict. c. 66))
Leases Act 1845 (repealed)	8 & 9 Vict. c. 124	8 August 1845
An Act to facilitate the granting of certain Leases. (Repealed by Statute Law (Repeals) Act 1989 (c. 43))
Turnpike Acts (Ireland) Act 1845 (repealed)	8 & 9 Vict. c. 125	8 August 1845
An Act to continue until the Thirty-first Day of July One thousand eight hundred and forty-six, and to the End of the then Session of Parliament, certain Acts for regulating Turnpike Roads in Ireland. (Repealed by Statute Law Revision Act 1875 (38 & 39 Vict. c. 66))
County Asylums Act 1845 (repealed)	8 & 9 Vict. c. 126	8 August 1845
An Act to amend the Laws for the Provision and Regulation of Lunatic Asylums for Counties and Boroughs, and for the Maintenance and Care of Pauper Lunatics, in England. (Repealed by Lunatic Asylums Act 1853 (16 & 17 Vict. c. 97))
Small Debts Act 1845 (repealed)	8 & 9 Vict. c. 127	9 August 1845
An Act for the better securing the Payment of Small Debts. (Repealed by Courts and Legal Services Act 1990 (c. 41))
Silk Weavers Act 1845 (repealed)	8 & 9 Vict. c. 128	9 August 1845
An Act to make further Regulations respecting the Tickets of Work to be delivered to Silk Weavers in certain Cases. (Repealed by Statute Law Revision Act 1959 (7 & 8 Eliz. 2. c. 68))
Exchequer Bills Act 1845 (repealed)	8 & 9 Vict. c. 129	9 August 1845
An Act for raising the Sum of Nine millions and twenty-four thousand nine hundred Pounds by Exchequer Bills, for the Service of the Year One thousand eight hundred and forty-five. (Repealed by Statute Law Revision Act 1875 (38 & 39 Vict. c. 66))
Appropriation Act 1845 (repealed)	8 & 9 Vict. c. 130	9 August 1845
An Act to apply the Sum of Ten millions eight hundred sixty-nine thousand two hundred and thirty-nine Pounds One Shilling and Seven-pence out of the Consolidated Fund, and certain other Sums, to the Service of the Year One thousand eight hundred and forty-five, and to appropriate the Supplies granted in this Session of Parliament. (Repealed by Statute Law Revision Act 1875 (38 & 39 Vict. c. 66))

=== Local acts ===
Short title	Citation	Royal assent
Long title
City of London Borrowing Act 1845 (repealed)	8 & 9 Vict. c. i	24 April 1845
An Act to enable the Mayor and Commonalty and Citizens of the City of London to raise a Sum of Money at a reduced Rate of Interest, to pay off the Monies now charged on the Tolls and Duties payable by virtue of several Acts for improving the Navigation of the River Thames Westward of London Bridge, within the Liberties of the City of London; and to amend some of the said Acts. (Repealed by Thames Conservancy Act 1894 (57 & 58 Vict. c. clxxxvii))
Ellesmere and Chester Canal Company Act 1845	8 & 9 Vict. c. ii	8 May 1845
An Act for uniting the Birmingham and Liverpool Junction Canal Navigation Company with the Ellesmere and Chester Canal Company.
Forth and Clyde Navigation Act 1845	8 & 9 Vict. c. iii	8 May 1845
An Act for altering and enlarging the Powers and Provisions of the Acts relating to the Forth and Clyde Navigation.
Birkenhead Dock Act 1845 (repealed)	8 & 9 Vict. c. iv	8 May 1845
An Act for the Construction of a Dock, Wharf, Walls, and other Works, by the Birkenhead Dock Commissioners at Birkenhead in the County of Chester. (Repealed by Mersey Dock Acts Consolidation Act 1858 (21 & 22 Vict. c. xcii))
Kingston-upon-Hull Dock Act 1845	8 & 9 Vict. c. v	8 May 1845
An Act for amending the Acts relating to the Docks at Kingston-upon-Hull, and for enlarging one of the said Docks
Wallasey Improvement Act 1845 (repealed)	8 & 9 Vict. c. vi	8 May 1845
An Act for paving, lighting, watching, cleansing, and otherwise improving the Parish of Wallasey in the County of Chester; and for establishing a Police, and also a Market, within the said Parish; and for other Purposes. (Repealed by County of Merseyside Act 1980 (c. x))
London Orphan Asylum Act 1845	8 & 9 Vict. c. vii	8 May 1845
An Act to incorporate the Members of the Institution called "The London Orphan Asylum," and to enable them the better to carry on their charitable Designs.
Amicable Society for a Perpetual Assurance Office Act 1845 (repealed)	8 & 9 Vict. c. viii	8 May 1845
An Act to enable the Corporation of the Amicable Society for a perpetual Assurance Office to lend Money upon Mortgage for the Purpose of Investment, and also to confer other Powers upon the said Society. (Repealed by Amicable and Norwich Union Societies Act 1866 (29 & 30 Vict. c. cxxxv))
Bushey Heath to Aylesbury Road Act 1845	8 & 9 Vict. c. ix	8 May 1845
An Act for repairing the Road from the South End of Sparrows Herne on Bushey Heath, through Watford, Berkhampstead, Saint Peter, and Tring, in the County of Hertford, into the Town of Aylesbury in the County of Buckingham.
Stanford and Clifton-on-Teme Turnpike Road Act 1845 (repealed)	8 & 9 Vict. c. x	8 May 1845
An Act for making and maintaining a Turnpike Road from the Turnpike Road leading from Bromyard to Stourport, at or near to Stanford Bridge in the Parish of Stanford, to the Turnpike Road leading from Clifton to Worcester at or near to Ham Bridge in the Parish of Clifton-on-Teme in the County of Worcester. (Repealed by Annual Turnpike Acts Continuance Act 1875 (38 & 39 Vict. c. cxciv))
Liverpool Docks Act 1845 (repealed)	8 & 9 Vict. c. xi	20 May 1845
An Act to amend the Acts relating to the Docks and Harbour of Liverpool. (Repealed by Mersey Dock Acts Consolidation Act 1858 (21 & 22 Vict. c. xcii))
Bradford Gas Act 1845 (repealed)	8 & 9 Vict. c. xii	20 May 1845
An Act to alter the Provisions of an Act (Note: Bradford Gas Act 1822 (3 Geo. 4. c. vi)) for lighting with Gas the Town of Bradford and the Neighbourhood thereof, within the Parish of Bradford in the West Riding of the County of York. (Repealed by West Yorkshire Act 1980 (c.xiv))
Southwark Improvement Act 1845 (repealed)	8 & 9 Vict. c. xiii	20 May 1845
An Act for abolishing the Sunday Toll authorized by an Act passed in the Sixth Year of the Reign of His late Majesty King George the Third, intituled "An Act for paving the Streets and Lanes in the Town and Borough of Southwark, and certain Parts adjacent in the County of Surrey, and for cleansing, lighting, and watching the same, and also the Courts, Yards, Alleys, and Passages adjoining thereto, and for preventing Annoyances therein;" (Note: Southwark Improvement Act 1766 (6 Geo. 3. c. 24)) and for altering and amending the same Act; and for other Purposes. (Repealed by Statute Law (Repeals) Act 2013 (c. 2))
Glasgow, Parkhead and Woodend Turnpike Roads Act 1845 (repealed)	8 & 9 Vict. c. xiv	20 May 1845
An Act for completing the Line of the Glasgow, Parkend, and Woodend Turnpike Roads, for incorporating the same with the Roads under the Charge of the Glasgow and Shotts Road Trustees, and for the further Improvement and Maintenance of the said several Roads. (Repealed by Glasgow and Shotts Road Act 1847 (10 & 11 Vict. c. li))
Chester Improvement Act 1845	8 & 9 Vict. c. xv	30 June 1845
An Act for the better paving, lighting, and improving the Borough of Chester, and for establishing new Market Places therein.
Stoke-upon-Trent Market Act 1845 (repealed)	8 & 9 Vict. c. xvi	30 June 1845
An Act for establishing a Market in the Town and Borough of Stoke-upon-Trent in the County of Stafford. (Repealed by Local Government Board's Provisional Order Confirmation (No. 3) Act 1908 (8 Edw. 7. c. clxiv))
Clerkenwell Streets Act 1845	8 & 9 Vict. c. xvii	30 June 1845
An Act for amending the Acts relating to the Street leading to Clerkenwell Green; and for extending such Street, and making new Streets out of the same.
Paisley Gaslight Act 1845	8 & 9 Vict. c. xviii	30 June 1845
An Act for the better lighting the Town and Suburbs of Paisley with Gas.
Nottingham Waterworks Act 1845	8 & 9 Vict. c. xix	30 June 1845
An Act for granting more effectual Powers for supplying with Water the Inhabitants of the Town and County of the Town of Nottingham, and certain Places adjacent thereto, in the County of Nottingham.
Cromer Protection Act 1845 (repealed)	8 & 9 Vict. c. xx	30 June 1845
An Act to authorize the Erection of Sea Walls and Works, and a Jetty, at the Town or Parish of Cromer in the County of Norfolk, and otherwise to provide for protecting the said Town and Parish from the further Encroachment of the Sea. (Repealed by Cromer Urban District Council Act 1948 (11 & 12 Geo. 6. c. xix))
Battersea Rates Act 1845 (repealed)	8 & 9 Vict. c. xxi	30 June 1845
An Act for the better ascertaining and collecting the Poor and other Rates in the Parish of Battersea in the County of Surrey. (Repealed by London Government (Borough of Battersea) Order in Council 1901 (SR&O 1901/211))
Royal Naval School Act 1845 (repealed)	8 & 9 Vict. c. xxii	30 June 1845
An Act to carry into effect an Arrangement between the Corporation of the Royal Naval School and the Committee for managing the Patriotic Fund for the Admission of Pupils into the said School. (Repealed by Statute Law (Repeals) Act 2008 (c. 12))
Southampton Docks Act 1845 (repealed)	8 & 9 Vict. c. xxiii	30 June 1845
An Act to alter and enlarge the Powers and Provisions of the Acts for making a Dock or Docks at Southampton. (Repealed by Southampton Docks Act 1871 (34 & 35 Vict. c. cxxx))
Clifton Suspension Bridge Act 1845 (repealed)	8 & 9 Vict. c. xxiv	30 June 1845
An Act to amend the Acts for building a Bridge over the River Avon, from Clifton to the opposite Side of the River in the County of Somerset. (Repealed by Clifton Suspension Bridge Act 1952 (15 & 16 Geo. 6 & 1 Eliz. 2. c. xli))
Boddam Harbour Act 1845	8 & 9 Vict. c. xxv	30 June 1845
An Act for improving and maintaining the Harbour or Port of Boddam in the County of Aberdeen.
Claughton-cum-Grange (St. Andrew) Church Act 1845	8 & 9 Vict. c. xxvi	30 June 1845
An Act for enabling William Jackson Esquire to build and maintain a new Church in the Township of Claughton-cum-Grange in the County of Chester.
Claughton-cum-Grange (St. John the Baptist) Church Act 1845	8 & 9 Vict. c. xxvii	30 June 1845
An Act for enabling William Jackson Esquire to build and maintain a new Church in the Township of Claughton-cum-Grange in the County of Chester.
North British Insurance Company Act 1845 (repealed)	8 & 9 Vict. c. xxviii	30 June 1845
An Act to enable the North British Insurance Company to purchase Annuities, to take and hold Property, and to invest Money and Stock upon Mortgage; and for other Purposes relating to the said Company. (Repealed by North British Insurance Company's Act 1860 (23 & 24 Vict. c. cxv))
Glasgow Slaughterhouse and Market Act 1845 (repealed)	8 & 9 Vict. c. xxix	30 June 1845
An Act for the better Regulation and Management and for the Extension of the Slaughter Houses and Market Accommodation in the City of Glasgow; and for other Purposes in relation thereto. (Repealed by Glasgow Markets and Slaughterhouses Act 1865 (28 & 29 Vict. c. lxiii))
Stokenchurch and New Woodstock Road and Branches Act 1845 (repealed)	8 & 9 Vict. c. xxx	30 June 1845
An Act for repairing certain Roads between Stokenchurch and the Borough of New Woodstock in the County of Oxford, and several other Roads communicating therewith. (Repealed by Statute Law (Repeals) Act 2013 (c. 2))
Glasgow, Garnkirk and Coatbridge Railway Act 1845	8 & 9 Vict. c. xxxi	30 June 1845
An Act to enable the Glasgow, Garnkirk, and Coatbridge Railway Company to improve the Gauge of their Rails.
Kendal and Windermere Railway Act 1845	8 & 9 Vict. c. xxxii	30 June 1845
An Act for making a Railway from the Lancaster and Carlisle Railway to Birthwaite in the Parish of Windermere, to be called "The Kendal and Windermere Railway."
Chester and Holyhead Railway Act 1845 or the Chester and Holyhead Railway Completion Act 1845	8 & 9 Vict. c. xxxiii	30 June 1845
An Act for completing the Line of the Chester and Holyhead Railway, and for amending the Act (Note: Chester and Holyhead Railway Act 1844 (7 & 8 Vict. c. lxv)) relating to the said Railway.
York and North Midland Railway Act 1845	8 & 9 Vict. c. xxxiv	30 June 1845
An Act for enabling the York and North Midland Railway Company to alter the Line of the York and Scarborough Railway near the City of York.
East Lancashire Railway Act 1845 or the Blackburn, Burnley, Accrington and Colne Extension Railway Act 1845	8 & 9 Vict. c. xxxv	30 June 1845
An Act for extending the Manchester, Bury, and Rossendale Railway to the Towns of Blackburn, Burnley, Accrington, and Colne.
Leeds, Dewsbury and Manchester Railway Act 1845	8 & 9 Vict. c. xxxvi	30 June 1845
An Act for making a Railway from Leeds by Dewsbury to Huddersfield, all in the West Riding of the County of York, and for improving the Communication by Railway between the Towns of Leeds and Huddersfield and the Town of Manchester.
Dunstable and London and Birmingham Railway Act 1845 or the Dunstable Railway Act 1845	8 & 9 Vict. c. xxxvii	30 June 1845
An Act for making a Railway from the Town of Dunstable to join the London and Birmingham Railway near Leighton Buzzard in the County of Bedford.
Leeds and Bradford Railway Act 1845	8 & 9 Vict. c. xxxviii	30 June 1845
An Act for enabling the Leeds and Bradford Railway Company to make a Railway from Shipley to Colne, with a Branch to Haworth.
Huddersfield and Sheffield Junction Railway Act 1845	8 & 9 Vict. c. xxxix	30 June 1845
An Act for making a Railway from Huddersfield in the West Riding of the County of York to or near Penistone in the same Riding, there to form a Junction with the Sheffield, Ashton-under-Lyne, and Manchester Railway, to be called "The Huddersfield and Sheffield Junction Railway."
Berks and Hants Railway Act 1845	8 & 9 Vict. c. xl	30 June 1845
An Act for making a Railway from the Great Western Railway at or near Reading to the Towns of Newbury and Hungerford, and also to join the South-western Railway at or near Basingstoke.
Norfolk Railway Act 1845 (repealed)	8 & 9 Vict. c. xli	30 June 1845
An Act for the Consolidation of the Yarmouth and Norwich and Norwich and Brandon Railway Companies, and for authorizing the Construction of certain Works at Norwich in connexion with the Yarmouth and Norwich Railway. (Repealed by Great Eastern Railway Act 1862 (25 & 26 Vict. c. ccxxiii))
Shrewsbury, Oswestry and Chester Junction Railway Act 1845	8 & 9 Vict. c. xlii	30 June 1845
An Act for making a Railway from Shrewsbury in the County of Salop to Ruabon in the County of Denbigh, to be called "The Shrewsbury, Oswestry, and Chester Junction Railway."
Bedford and London and Birmingham Railway Act 1845	8 & 9 Vict. c. xliii	30 June 1845
An Act for making a Railway from the Town of Bedford to join the London and Birmingham Railway near Bletchley in the County of Buckingham.
Blackburn, Darwen and Bolton Railway Act 1845	8 & 9 Vict. c. xliv	30 June 1845
An Act for making a Railway from Blackburn to Bolton in the County of Lancaster, to be called "The Blackburn, Darwen, and Bolton Railway."
Lowestoft Railway and Harbour Act 1845	8 & 9 Vict. c. xlv	30 June 1845
An Act for making a Railway from Lowestoft in the County of Suffolk to the Yarmouth and Norwich Railway at Reedham in the County of Norfolk, and for improving the Harbour of Lowestoft.
Monkland and Kirkintilloch Railway Act 1845	8 & 9 Vict. c. xlvi	30 June 1845
An Act to enable the Monkland and Kirkintilloch Railway Company to improve the Gauge of their Rails.
Newcastle-upon-Tyne and North Shields Railway (Tynemouth Extension) Act 1845	8 & 9 Vict. c. xlvii	30 June 1845
An Act to authorize the Newcastle-upon-Tyne and North Shields Railway Company to make a Railway from North Shields to the Village of Tynemouth, and also a Branch from the present Line to the public Quay adjoining the River Tyne at Newcastle.
Ely and Huntingdon Railway Act 1845 (repealed)	8 & 9 Vict. c. xlviii	30 June 1845
An Act for making a Railway from Ely to Huntingdon. (Repealed by Great Eastern Railway Act 1862 (25 & 26 Vict. c. ccxxiii))
Midland Railway (Nottingham and Lincoln Railway) Act 1845	8 & 9 Vict. c. xlix	30 June 1845
An Act to empower the Midland Railway Company to extend the said Railway from Nottingham to Newark and Lincoln.
Great Grimsby and Sheffield Junction Railway Act 1845 (repealed)	8 & 9 Vict. c. l	30 June 1845
An Act for making a Railway from a Place in the Parish of Bole in the County of Nottingham, near to the Town and Port of Gainsborough, to the Town and Port of Great Grimsby in the Parts of Lindsey in the County of Lincoln, with Branches to the District or Place called New Holland, and to the Town of Market Rasen, to be called "The Great Grimsby and Sheffield Junction Railway." (Repealed by Manchester, Sheffield and Lincolnshire Railway Act 1849 (12 & 13 Vict. c. lxxxi))
Hull and Selby Railway (Bridlington Branch) Act 1845	8 & 9 Vict. c. li	30 June 1845
An Act for making a Branch Railway from the Hull and Selby Railway to Bridlington, and for other Purposes relating to the Hull and Selby Railway.
Brighton, Hastings and Lewes Railway (Keymer Branch) Act 1845	8 & 9 Vict. c. lii	30 June 1845
An Act to enable the Brighton Lewes and Hastings Railway Company to make a Branch Railway from Southover, Lewes, to join the London and Brighton Railway at Keymer.
Wilts, Somerset and Weymouth Railway Act 1845	8 & 9 Vict. c. liii	30 June 1845
An Act for making a Railway from the Great Western Railway to the City of Salisbury and Town of Weymouth, with other Railways in connexion therewith, to be called "The Wilts, Somerset, and Weymouth Railway."
Manchester and Leeds Railway Act (No. 2) 1845	8 & 9 Vict. c. liv	30 June 1845
An Act for amending the Acts relating to the Manchester and Leeds Railway, and for making a Branch therefrom to Burnley, and for extending the Oldham and Heywood Branches.
Lynn and Ely Railway Act 1845	8 & 9 Vict. c. lv	30 June 1845
An Act for making a Railway from Lynn to Ely, with Branches therefrom.
Midland Railway Act 1845	8 & 9 Vict. c. lvi	30 June 1845
An Act to empower the Midland Railway Company to make a Branch from the said Railway near Syston in the County of Leicester to the City of Peterborough.
Whitby and Pickering Railway Act 1845	8 & 9 Vict. c. lvii	30 June 1845
An Act for authorizing the Sale of the Whitby and Pickering Railway to the York and North Midland Railway Company, and for enabling the said Company to make certain Deviations or Alterations in the Line of the Whitby and Pickering Railway.
York and North Midland Railway (Bridlington Branch) Act 1845	8 & 9 Vict. c. lviii	30 June 1845
An Act for enabling the York and North Midland Railway Company to make a Branch Railway from the Line of the York and Scarborough Railway, in the Township of Seamer, to Bridlington.
Newcastle-upon-Tyne Port Act 1845 (repealed)	8 & 9 Vict. c. lix	30 June 1845
An Act for amending an Act of the Forty-first Year of the Reign of His Majesty King George the Third (Note: Newcastle-upon-Tyne Trinity House and Port Act 1801 (41 Geo. 3. (U.K.) c. lxxxvi)) relating to the Port of Newcastle-upon-Tyne; and for granting further Powers and for establishing and maintaining an efficient River Police, and for regulating the said Port. (Repealed by Tyne Improvement Act 1852 (15 & 16 Vict. c. cx))
Birkenhead Dock Company Act 1845 (repealed)	8 & 9 Vict. c. lx	30 June 1845
An Act for constructing Docks, Walls, Warehouses, and other Works in Birkenhead. (Repealed by Mersey Dock Acts Consolidation Act 1858 (21 & 22 Vict. c. xcii))
Docks at Wexford Act 1845	8 & 9 Vict. c. lxi	30 June 1845
An Act for constructing Docks at Wexford, to be called "The Castle Hill Docks," and for the Regulation and Management thereof.
Charing Cross Bridge Act 1845	8 & 9 Vict. c. lxii	30 June 1845
An Act to amend the Acts relating to the Hungerford and Lambeth Suspension Foot Bridge Company, hereafter to be called "The Charing Cross Bridge Company," and for granting further Powers to the said Company.
Pudsey Gas Act 1845	8 & 9 Vict. c. lxiii	30 June 1845
An Act for better supplying with Gas the Township of Pudsey and the Village of Farsley, and the Neighbourhood thereof, all in the Parish of Calverley in the West Riding of the County of York.
Devonport Gas and Coke Company Act 1845 (repealed)	8 & 9 Vict. c. lxiv	30 June 1845
An Act for better supplying with Gas the Borough of Devonport. (Repealed by Devonport Gas and Coke Act 1853 (16 & 17 Vict. c. xii))
Plymouth and Stonehouse Gas Act 1845 (repealed)	8 & 9 Vict. c. lxv	30 June 1845
An Act for better supplying with Gas the Town and Neighbourhood of Plymouth. (Repealed by Plymouth and Stonehouse Gas Act 1855 (18 & 19 Vict. c. xxxv))
Birmingham and Staffordshire Gaslight Company Act 1845 (repealed)	8 & 9 Vict. c. lxvi	30 June 1845
An Act to enlarge the Powers of the Birmingham and Staffordshire Gas Light Company. (Repealed by Birmingham Corporation (Consolidation) Act 1883 (46 & 47 Vict. c. lxx))
Taunton Gas Act 1845	8 & 9 Vict. c. lxvii	30 June 1845
An Act for better supplying with Gas the Town and Neighbourhood of Taunton in the County of Somerset.
Scarborough and Falsegrave Water Act 1845 or the Scarborough Waterworks Act 1845	8 & 9 Vict. c. lxviii	30 June 1845
An Act for better supplying with Water the Towns of Scarborough and Falsgrave in the Parish of Scar borough in the County of York.
Southwark and Vauxhall Water Company Act 1845 or the Vauxhall and Southwark Water Act 1845 (repealed)	8 & 9 Vict. c. lxix	30 June 1845
An Act for uniting the Vauxhall and Southwark Water Companies into One Company, to be called The Southwark and Vauxhall Water Company, and for extending the Works of the said Company. (Repealed by Southwark and Vauxhall Water Act 1852 (15 & 16 Vict. c. clviii))
Huddersfield Water Act 1845	8 & 9 Vict. c. lxx	30 June 1845
An Act to alter, enlarge, and amend an Act for supplying with Water the Town and Neighbourhood of Huddersfield in the West Riding of the County of York.
Whittle Dean Waterworks Act 1845 (repealed)	8 & 9 Vict. c. lxxi	30 June 1845
An Act for supplying the Borough and County of Newcastle-upon-Tyne and the Borough of Gateshead in the County of Durham, and the Neighbourhoods thereof, with Water, from Whittle Dean in the Parish of Ovingham, and other Places in Northumberland. (Repealed by Whittle Dean Waterworks Act 1854 (17 & 18 Vict. c. lx))
Greenock Water Act 1845 (repealed)	8 & 9 Vict. c. lxxii	30 June 1845
An Act to enable the Shaws Water Joint Stock Company to increase the Supply of Water for driving Mills and Machinery near the Town of Greenock, and for the Use of the Inhabitants of the said Town and Harbours thereof. (Repealed by Greenock and Shaws Water Transfer Act 1866 (29 & 30 Vict. c. cccviii))
Newcastle-upon-Tyne Coal Trade Act 1845 (repealed)	8 & 9 Vict. c. lxxiii	30 June 1845
An Act to regulate the loading of Ships with Coals in the Port of Newcastle-upon-Tyne. (Repealed by Tyne Improvement Act 1865 (28 & 29 Vict. c. cclxxiv))
Hemel Hempstead Rates Act 1845 (repealed)	8 & 9 Vict. c. lxxiv	30 June 1845
An Act for better assessing and collecting the Poor Rates, Highway Rates, and Church Rates in the Parish of Hemel Hempsted in the County of Hertford. (Repealed by Statute Law (Repeals) Act 2008 (c. 12))
Standard Life Assurance Company Act 1845 (repealed)	8 & 9 Vict. c. lxxv	30 June 1845
An Act to alter and extend some of the Provisions contained in the Act of Parliament (Note: Standard Life Assurance Company Act 1832 (2 & 3 Will. 4. c. lxxxi)) constituting "The Standard Life Assurance Company." (Repealed by Standard Life Assurance Company Act 1910 (10 Edw. 7 & 1 Geo. 5. c. x))
Edinburgh Life Assurance Company Act 1845	8 & 9 Vict. c. lxxvi	30 June 1845
An Act for conferring on the Edinburgh Life Assurance Company certain Privileges of a Corporate Body, and as such to sue and be sued, to hold Property, and for other Purposes relating thereto.
West of London and Westminster Cemetery Company Act 1845	8 & 9 Vict. c. lxxvii	30 June 1845
An Act for amending the Act (Note: West of London and Westminster Cemetery Company Act 1837 (7 Will. 4 & 1 Vict. c. cxxx)) establishing "The West of London and Westminster Cemetery Company;" and for enabling the Company to raise a further Sum of Money.
Thames Watermen Act 1845	8 & 9 Vict. c. lxxviii	30 June 1845
An Act to enable the Master, Wardens, and Commonalty of Watermen and Lightermen of the River Thames to invest their Poor's Fund and the Endowment Fund of the Free Watermen and Lightermen's Asylum in the Purchase of Land or on Mortgage, and to hold Lands for the Purposes of the said Funds.
Crediton Court of Requests Act 1845 (repealed)	8 & 9 Vict. c. lxxix	30 June 1845
An Act for the more easy and speedy Recovery of Small Debts within the Town of Crediton in the County of Devon, and other Places in the same County. (Repealed by County Courts Act 1846 (9 & 10 Vict. c. 95))
London and Greenwich Railway Act 1845	8 & 9 Vict. c. lxxx	21 July 1845
An Act to authorize the London and Greenwich Railway Company to let on Lease the London and Greenwich Railway, and for amending the Acts relating to such Railway.
Belfast and Ballymena Railway Act 1845	8 & 9 Vict. c. lxxxi	21 July 1845
An Act for making a Railway from Belfast to Ballymena in the County of Antrim, with Branches to Carrickfergus and Randalstown.
North British Railway Act 1845 or the North British Railway (Edinburgh and Dalkeith Purchase) Act 1845	8 & 9 Vict. c. lxxxii	21 July 1845
An Act to empower the North British Railway Company to purchase the Edinburgh and Dalkeith Railway, and to alter Part of the Line of the said Railway and of the North British Railway, and to construct certain Branch Railways in connexion therewith.
Lancaster and Carlisle Railway Act 1845	8 & 9 Vict. c. lxxxiii	21 July 1845
An Act to enable the Lancaster and Carlisle Railway Company to alter the Line of such Railway, and to make a Branch therefrom; and for other Purposes relating thereto.
York and North Midland Railway (No. 2) Act 1845	8 & 9 Vict. c. lxxxiv	21 July 1845
An Act for enabling the York and North Midland Railway Company to make a Railway from the Line of the York and North Midland Railway to Harrogate.
North Woolwich Railway Act 1845	8 & 9 Vict. c. lxxxv	21 July 1845
An Act for making a Railway from the Eastern Counties and Thames Junction Railway, near the Mouth of the River Lea, to North Woolwich.
Guildford Junction Railway Act 1845	8 & 9 Vict. c. lxxxvi	21 July 1845
An Act for authorizing the Sale of the Guildford Junction Railway.
Waterford and Kilkenny Railway Act 1845	8 & 9 Vict. c. lxxxvii	21 July 1845
An Act for making a Railway from Waterford to Kilkenny, with a Branch to Kells, in the County of Kilkenny.
Exeter and Crediton Railway Act 1845	8 & 9 Vict. c. lxxxviii	21 July 1845
An Act for making a Railway from Exeter to Crediton in the County of Devon.
Bridgwater Navigation and Quays Act 1845	8 & 9 Vict. c. lxxxix	21 July 1845
An Act for improving the Navigation of the River and Bay leading to the Borough of Bridgwater; for maintaining the present Bridge, and extending the Quays within the Borough; and for forming a Communication by Road and by Railway between the Quays and the Bristol and Exeter Railway.
Sheffield and Rotherham and Midland Railways Consolidation Act 1845	8 & 9 Vict. c. xc	21 July 1845
An Act for authorizing the Consolidation of the Sheffield and Rotherham Railway with the Midland Railways, and for making a Branch Railway from and other Works in connexion with the said Sheffield and Rotherham Railway.
Edinburgh and Glasgow Railway Act 1845 (repealed)	8 & 9 Vict. c. xci	21 July 1845
An Act to amend the Acts relating to the Edinburgh and Glasgow Railway; and to authorize the Formation of additional Branches. (Repealed by Edinburgh and Glasgow Railway Consolidation Act 1852 (15 & 16 Vict. c. cix))
Newcastle and Darlington Junction Railway Act 1845	8 & 9 Vict. c. xcii	21 July 1845
An Act for enabling the Newcastle and Darlington Junction Railway Company to purchase the Brandling Junction Railway; and to enable the said Company to make certain Branch Railways, Stations, and Works; and for other Purposes.
Southampton and Dorchester Railway Act 1845	8 & 9 Vict. c. xciii	21 July 1845
An Act for making a Railway from Southampton to Dorchester, with a Branch to the Town of Poole.
Eastern Union Railway Amendment Act 1845 (repealed)	8 & 9 Vict. c. xciv	21 July 1845
An Act to amend the Act (Note: Eastern Union Railway Act 1844 (7 & 8 Vict. c. lxxxv)) relating to the Eastern Union Railway Company, and to raise a further Sum of Money for the Purposes of the said Undertaking. (Repealed by Great Eastern Railway Act 1862 (25 & 26 Vict. c. ccxxiii))
Glasgow, Paisley, Kilmarnock and Ayr Railway Act 1845	8 & 9 Vict. c. xcv	21 July 1845
An Act to authorize an Extension of the Glasgow, Paisley, Kilmarnock, and Ayr Railway to near Cumnock; and to amend the Acts relating to such Railway.
Dundalk and Enniskillen Railway Act 1845	8 & 9 Vict. c. xcvi	21 July 1845
An Act for effecting a Railway Communication between Dundalk and Enniskillen.
Ipswich and Bury St. Edmunds Railway Act 1845 (repealed)	8 & 9 Vict. c. xcvii	21 July 1845
An Act for making a Railway from the Eastern Union Railway at Ipswich to Bury Saint Edmunds. (Repealed by Great Eastern Railway Act 1862 (25 & 26 Vict. c. ccxxiii))
Londonderry and Enniskillen Railway Act 1845	8 & 9 Vict. c. xcviii	21 July 1845
An Act for making a Railway from Londonderry to Enniskillen.
Chester and Birkenhead Railway Act 1845 (repealed)	8 & 9 Vict. c. xcix	21 July 1845
An Act to authorize the Chester and Birkenhead Railway Company to extend the said Railway from Grange Lane to Bridge End, all in Birkenhead; and to amend the Acts relating to the said Railway. (Repealed by Birkenhead, Lancashire and Cheshire Junction Railway Act 1852 (15 & 16 Vict. c. clxvii))
Whitehaven and Furness Junction Railway Act 1845	8 & 9 Vict. c. c	21 July 1845
An Act for making a Railway from Whitehaven in the County of Cumberland to a Point of Junction with the Furness Railway in the Parish of Dalton in the County Palatine of Lancaster, to be called "The Whitehaven and Furness Junction Railway."
East Lancashire Railway Act 1845 No. 2 or the East Lancashire Railway (No. 2) Act 1845	8 & 9 Vict. c. ci	21 July 1845
An Act for amending the Act (Note: East Lancashire Railway Act 1844 (7 & 8 Vict. c. lx)) relating to the Manchester, Bury, and Rossendale Railway.
Great North of England and Richmond Railway Act 1845	8 & 9 Vict. c. cii	21 July 1845
An Act to enable the Great North of England Railway Company to make a Branch Railway, to be called "The Great North of England and Richmond Railway," in the County of York.
Blackburn and Preston Railway Act 1845	8 & 9 Vict. c. ciii	21 July 1845
An Act for altering the Line of the Blackburn and Preston Railway; and for amending the Act (Note: Blackburn and Preston Railway Act 1844 (7 & 8 Vict. c. xxxiv)) relating thereto.
Leeds and Thirsk Railway Act 1845	8 & 9 Vict. c. civ	21 July 1845
An Act for making a Railway from Leeds to Thirsk, with Branches therefrom.
Huddersfield and Manchester Railway and Canal Act 1845	8 & 9 Vict. c. cv	21 July 1845
An Act for making a Railway from the Sheffield, Ashton-under-Lyne, and Manchester Railway at Stalybridge to the Manchester and Leeds Railway at Kirkheaton, with a Branch therefrom; and for consolidating into One Undertaking the said proposed Railway and the Huddersfield Canal Navigation.
North Wales Railway Act 1845	8 & 9 Vict. c. cvi	21 July 1845
An Act for making and maintaining a Railway from Porth Dyllaen in the Parish of Edern to Bangor in the County of Carnarvon, to be called "The North Wales Railway."
Taw Vale Railway and Dock Act 1845	8 & 9 Vict. c. cvii	21 July 1845
An Act to amend the Act (Note: Taw Vale Railway and Dock Act 1838 (1 & 2 Vict. c. xxvii)) relating to the Taw Vale Railway and Dock.
Manchester and Birmingham Railway (Ashton Branch) Act 1845 (repealed)	8 & 9 Vict. c. cviii	21 July 1845
An Act for making a Railway to connect the Manchester and Birmingham, and Sheffield, Ashton-under-Lyne, and Manchester Railways, near Guides Bridge; and for other Purposes connected with the said Manchester and Birmingham Railway. (Repealed by London and North Western Railway Act 1846 (9 & 10 Vict. c. cciv))
Ashton, Stalybridge and Liverpool Junction Railway Act 1845	8 & 9 Vict. c. cix	21 July 1845
An Act for amending the Act (Note: Ashton, Stalybridge and Liverpool Junction Railway Act 1844 (7 & 8 Vict. c. lxxxii)) relating to the Ashton, Stalybridge, and Liverpool Junction Railway, and for making a Branch therefrom to Ardwick.
Eastern Counties Railway Act 1845	8 & 9 Vict. c. cx	21 July 1845
An Act to enable the Eastern Counties Railway Company to make a Deviation from the Line of their authorized Railway between Ely and Peterborough.
Manchester South Junction and Altrincham Railway Act 1845 (repealed)	8 & 9 Vict. c. cxi	21 July 1845
An Act for making a Railway to connect the Manchester and Birmingham and Liverpool and Manchester Railways in the Parish of Manchester, and also to Altrincham in the County of Chester, to be called "The Manchester South Junction and Altrincham Railway." (Repealed by Manchester South Junction and Altrincham Railway Act 1878 (41 & 42 Vict. c. cxxx) (Note: Incorrectly cited as "Manchester South Junction and Altrincham Rly. 1878 (c.xxx)" in the Chronological Table of Local Acts.))
Trent Valley Railway Act 1845	8 & 9 Vict. c. cxii	21 July 1845
An Act for making a Railway from Stafford to Rugby.
London and Brighton Railway (Horsham Branch) Act 1845	8 & 9 Vict. c. cxiii	21 July 1845
An Act for making a Branch Railway from the London and Brighton Railway to or near to the Town of Horsham in the County of Sussex.
Ulster Railway Extension Act 1845	8 & 9 Vict. c. cxiv	21 July 1845
An Act to amend the Act (Note: Ulster Railway Act 1836 (6 & 7 Will. 4. c. xxxiii)) relating to the Ulster Railway Company; (Note: Ulster Railway Act 1836 (6 & 7 Will. 4. c. xxxiii)) and to enable the said Company to make a Railway from Portadown to Armagh.
North Wales Mineral Railway Extension Act 1845	8 & 9 Vict. c. cxv	21 July 1845
An Act to authorize the North Wales Mineral Railway Company to extend their Line to Ruabon, and to make a Branch Railway from Rhos Robin to Minera, and to raise additional Capital for those Purposes.
North Union and Ribble Navigation Branch Railway Act 1845	8 & 9 Vict. c. cxvi	21 July 1845
An Act for enabling the North Union Railway Company and the Ribble Navigation Company to make a Branch or Connexion Railway from the North Union Railway to the Victoria Quay in Preston; and for amending and enlarging the Powers and Provisions of the several Acts relating to such Railway and Navigation respectively.
St. Helens Canal and Railway Act 1845	8 & 9 Vict. c. cxvii	21 July 1845
An Act for uniting the Sankey Brook Navigation with the Saint Helens and Runcorn Gap Railway; and for other Purposes.
Great North of England, Clarence and Hartlepool Junction Railway Act 1845	8 & 9 Vict. c. cxviii	21 July 1845
An Act for enabling the Great North of England, Clarence, and Hartlepool Junction Railway Company to make a Branch Railway; and for amending the Acts relating to the said Railway.
Midland Great Western Railway of Ireland Act 1845 or the Midland Great Western Railway Act 1845 (repealed)	8 & 9 Vict. c. cxix	21 July 1845
An Act for making a Railway from Dublin to Mullingar and Longford, to be called "The Midland Great Western Railway of Ireland." (Repealed by Statute Law (Repeals) Act 2013 (c. 2))
Cockermouth and Workington Railway Act 1845	8 & 9 Vict. c. cxx	21 July 1845
An Act for making a Railway from the Market Town of Cockermouth to the Port and Harbour of Workington in the County of Cumberland.
Richmond (Surrey) Railway Act 1845	8 & 9 Vict. c. cxxi	21 July 1845
An Act for making a Railway from Richmond in the County of Surrey to the South-western Railway at Battersea in the same County, to be called "The Richmond Railway."
Cork and Bandon Railway Act 1845 (repealed)	8 & 9 Vict. c. cxxii	21 July 1845
An Act for making a Railway from Cork to Bandon. (Repealed by Cork and Kinsale Junction, Cork and Bandon, West Cork and Ilen Valley Railways Act 1879 (42 & 43 Vict. c. clxxxvii))
Liverpool and Manchester Railway Act 1845	8 & 9 Vict. c. cxxiii	21 July 1845
An Act for enabling the Liverpool and Manchester Railway Company to extend and enlarge the said Railway, and to make certain Branch Railways, and for amending and enlarging the Powers of the several Acts relating to the said Railway.
Great Southern and Western Railway (Ireland) (Extension to Cork and Limerick) Act 1845	8 & 9 Vict. c. cxxiv	21 July 1845
An Act to authorize the Extension of the Great Southern and Western Railway to the City of Cork, with a Branch Railway to the City of Limerick.
Preston and Wyre Railway, Harbour and Dock Act 1845	8 & 9 Vict. c. cxxv	21 July 1845
An Act to amend the several Acts relating to the Preston and Wyre Railway, Harbour, and Dock Company; and to enable the said Company to make Three several Branch Railways.
Lynn and Dereham Railway Act 1845	8 & 9 Vict. c. cxxvi	21 July 1845
An Act for making a Railway from Lynn to Dereham.
Middlesbrough and Redcar Railway Act 1845	8 & 9 Vict. c. cxxvii	21 July 1845
An Act for making a Railway from Middlesbro' to or near the Town of Redcar in the North Riding of the County of York. to be called "The Middlesbro' and Redcar Railway."
Dublin and Drogheda Railway Act 1845	8 & 9 Vict. c. cxxviii	21 July 1845
An Act to enable the Dublin and Drogheda Railway Company to make a Branch Railway to Howth; and to amend the Acts relating to such Company.
Newry and Enniskillen Railway Act 1845 (repealed)	8 & 9 Vict. c. cxxix	21 July 1845
An Act for making a Railway from the Town of Newry to the Town of Enniskillen. (Repealed by Newry and Enniskillen Railway Amendment Act 1847 (10 & 11 Vict. c. lxxxv))
Dublin and Belfast Junction and Navan Branch Railway Act 1845	8 & 9 Vict. c. cxxx	21 July 1845
An Act for making a Railway from Drogheda to Portadown, with a Branch to Navan.
Waterford and Limerick Railway Act 1845	8 & 9 Vict. c. cxxxi	21 July 1845
An Act for making and maintaining a Railway from the City of Waterford to the City of Limerick, with Branches.
Glossop Gas Act 1845	8 & 9 Vict. c. cxxxii	21 July 1845
An Act for lighting with Gas the Town and Township of Glossop in the County of Derby.
Glasgow Bridges Act 1845 (repealed)	8 & 9 Vict. c. cxxxiii	21 July 1845
An Act for consolidating the Management of the Bridges over the Clyde at Glasgow; for rebuilding the Bridge over the said River opposite Stockwell Street in the City of Glasgow; for erecting a temporary Bridge for the Use of the Public; for erecting across the said River an Iron Bridge for Foot Passengers, on the existing Bridge opposite to Portland Street of Laurieston being taken down; and other Purposes. (Repealed by Glasgow Bridges Consolidation Act 1866 (29 & 30 Vict. c. cccxxvii))
Totnes Improvement Act 1845 or the Totnes Markets and Water Act 1845	8 & 9 Vict. c. cxxxiv	21 July 1845
An Act for improving the Markets in the Borough and Town of Totnes in the County of Devon, and for better supplying the Borough with Water.
Wolverhampton Waterworks Act 1845	8 & 9 Vict. c. cxxxv	21 July 1845
An Act for better supplying with Water the Town of Wolverhampton in the County of Stafford.
Lyme Regis Improvement and Water Act 1845	8 & 9 Vict. c. cxxxvi	21 July 1845
An Act for making Two new Streets, with Improvements and Waterworks, within the Town of Lyme Regis in the County of Dorset, and for watching and lighting the said Town.
Dundee Waterworks Act 1845 (repealed)	8 & 9 Vict. c. cxxxvii	21 July 1845
An Act for supplying with Water the Royal Burgh of Dundee and Suburbs thereof. (Repealed by Dundee Corporation (Water, Transport, Finance, &c.) Order Confirmation Act 1954 (2 & 3 Eliz. 2. c. ix))
Blackburn Waterworks Act 1845 (repealed)	8 & 9 Vict. c. cxxxviii	21 July 1845
An Act for better supplying with Water the Town and Township of Blackburn in the County Palantine of Lancaster. (Repealed by Fylde Water Board Order 1960 (SI 1960/89))
Hartlepool Pier and Port Act 1845 (repealed)	8 & 9 Vict. c. cxxxix	21 July 1845
An Act for amending the Acts relative to the improving of the Pier and Port of Hartlepool in the County of Durham. (Repealed by Hartlepool Pier and Port Act 1851 (14 & 15 Vict. c. cxvii))
Kendal Reservoirs Act 1845	8 & 9 Vict. c. cxl	21 July 1845
An Act for making and maintaining Reservoirs in the Parish of Kendal in the County of Westmorland.
Manchester Improvement Act 1845	8 & 9 Vict. c. cxli	21 July 1845
An Act to effect Improvements in the Borough of Manchester for the Purpose of promoting the Health of the Inhabitants thereof.
Belfast Improvement Act 1845	8 & 9 Vict. c. cxlii	21 July 1845
An Act for the Improvement of the Borough of Belfast.
Chelsea Improvement Act 1845 (repealed)	8 & 9 Vict. c. cxliii	21 July 1845
An Act for better paving, lighting, cleansing, regulating, and improving the Parish of Saint Luke Chelsea (exclusive of the District of Hans Town) in the County of Middlesex. (Repealed by London Government (Borough of Chelsea) Order in Council 1901 (SR&O 1901/265))
Queenborough Debts Act 1845	8 & 9 Vict. c. cxliv	21 July 1845
An Act to make Provision for the Payment of the Debts of the Mayor, Jurats, Bailiffs, and Burgesses of the Borough of Quinborowe in the County of Kent; and for other Purposes.
Manchester Court of Record Act 1845 (repealed)	8 & 9 Vict. c. cxlv	21 July 1845
An Act for more effectually constituting and regulating the Court of Record within the Borough of Manchester, and for extending the Jurisdiction of the said Court. (Repealed by Manchester Court of Record Procedure Act 1854 (17 & 18 Vict. c. lxxxiv))
Reversionary Interest Society Act 1845	8 & 9 Vict. c. cxlvi	21 July 1845
An Act for regulating legal Proceeding by and against "The Reversionary Interest Society," and for granting certain Powers to the said Society.
Agricultural and Commercial Bank of Ireland Act 1845	8 & 9 Vict. c. cxlvii	21 July 1845
An Act to facilitate the winding up of the Affairs of the Agricultural and Commercial Bank of Ireland.
Forth and Clyde Navigation and Edinburgh and Glasgow Union Canal Act 1845	8 & 9 Vict. c. cxlviii	21 July 1845
An Act for altering and amending certain Acts relating to the Forth and Clyde Navigation and the Edinburgh and Glasgow Union Canal, and for forming a Junction between the said Navigation and Canal.
Keyingham (and others) Drainage (Yorkshire) Act 1845	8 & 9 Vict. c. cxlix	21 July 1845
An Act to amend an Act (Note: Holderness Drainage Act 1772 (12 Geo. 3. c. 64 Pr.)) for draining the Low Grounds and Cars in the Parish of Keyingham and other Places in the East Riding of the County of York.
Road from Shepley Lane Head to Barnsley and Grange Moor Road Act 1845 (repealed)	8 & 9 Vict. c. cl	21 July 1845
An Act for making and maintaining in repair a complete Line of Turnpike Road from Shepley Lane Head to the Barnesley and Grange Moor Turnpike Road at or near Redbrooke Plantation in the Parish of Darton, all in the West Riding of the County of York. (Repealed by Annual Turnpike Acts Continuance Act 1875 (38 & 39 Vict. c. cxciv))
Road from Harwell to Streatley (Berkshire) Act 1845 (repealed)	8 & 9 Vict. c. cli	21 July 1845
An Act for repairing and maintaining the Road from Harwell to Streatley in the County of Berks. (Repealed by Statute Law (Repeals) Act 2013 (c. 2))
Wear Valley Railway Act 1845 (repealed)	8 & 9 Vict. c. clii	31 July 1845
An Act for making a Railway, to be called "The Wear Valley Railway," from and out of the Bishop Auckland and Weardale Railway to Frosterley, with a Branch terminating at or near Bishopley Crag in Stanhope in Weardale, all in the County of Durham. (Repealed by Stockton and Darlington Railway Amalgamation Act 1858 (21 & 22 Vict. c. cxvi))
Aberdeen Railway Act 1845 (repealed)	8 & 9 Vict. c. cliii	31 July 1845
An Act for making a Railway from Aberdeen to Friockheim and Guthrie, with Branch Lines to Montrose and Brechin, to be called "The Aberdeen Railway." (Repealed by Aberdeen Railway Act 1850 (13 & 14 Vict. c. lxxviii))
Norwich and Brandon Railway Act 1845	8 & 9 Vict. c. cliv	31 July 1845
An Act for altering the Line of the Norwich and Brandon Railway, and for making a Branch therefrom to East Dereham in the County of Norfolk.
Bristol and Exeter Railway Act 1845	8 & 9 Vict. c. clv	31 July 1845
An Act to amend the Acts relating to the Bristol and Exeter Railway, and to authorize the Formation of a Junction Railway and several Branch Railways connected with the same.
London and Birmingham Railway Act 1845	8 & 9 Vict. c. clvi	31 July 1845
An Act for enabling the London and Birmingham Railway Company to take a Lease of the West London Railway.
Dundee and Perth Railway Act 1845	8 & 9 Vict. c. clvii	31 July 1845
An Act for making a Railway from the Royal Burgh of Dundee in the County of Forfar to the Royal Burgh or City of Perth in the County of Perth, to be called "The Dundee and Perth Railway."
Edinburgh and Northern Railway Act 1845	8 & 9 Vict. c. clviii	31 July 1845
An Act for making a Railway from Burntisland in the County of Fife to the City of Perth, with certain Branches therefrom, to be called "The Edinburgh and Northern Railway."
Aberdare Railway Act 1845	8 & 9 Vict. c. clix	31 July 1845
An Act for making a Railway from the Taff Vale Railway near Ynys Meyrick to Aberdare, with a Branch therefrom, to be called "The Aberdare Railway."
Clydesdale Junction Railway Act 1845	8 & 9 Vict. c. clx	31 July 1845
An Act for making a Railway from the Termination of the Polloc and Govan Railway at Rutherglen to Hamilton, and to the Wishaw and Coltness Railway at Motherwell, to be called "The Clydesdale Junction Railway."
Scottish Central Railway Act 1845 (repealed)	8 & 9 Vict. c. clxi	31 July 1845
An Act for making a Railway from the City of Perth, by Stirling, to the Edinburgh and Glasgow Railway, to be called The Scottish Central Railway. (Repealed by Scottish Central Railway Consolidation Act 1859 (22 & 23 Vict. c. lxxxiii))
Caledonian Railway Act 1845	8 & 9 Vict. c. clxii	31 July 1845
An Act for making a Railway from Carlisle to Edinburgh and Glasgow and the North of Scotland, to be called "The Caledonian Railway."
Newcastle and Berwick Railway Act 1845	8 & 9 Vict. c. clxiii	31 July 1845
An Act for making a Railway from Newcastle-upon-Tyne to Berwick-upon-Tweed, with Branches therefrom, to be called "The Newcastle and Berwick Railway."
Edinburgh and Hawick Railway Act 1845 (repealed)	8 & 9 Vict. c. clxiv	31 July 1845
An Act for making a Railway from the Edinburgh and Hawick Railway to the Town of Hawick in the County of Roxburgh. (Repealed by North British Railway Consolidation Act 1858 (21 & 22 Vict. c. cix))
London and South-western Railway Metropolitan Extensions Act 1845	8 & 9 Vict. c. clxv	31 July 1845
An Act to amend the Acts relating to the London and South-western Railway, and to authorize Extensions thereof from the Nine Elms Terminus to a Point near to Waterloo and Hungerford Bridges in the Parish of Saint Mary Lambeth, and to the Thames at Nine Elms in the Parish of Battersea, all in the County of Surrey.
Liverpool and Bury Railway Act 1845	8 & 9 Vict. c. clxvi	31 July 1845
An Act for making a Railway from Liverpool to Wigan, Bolton, and Bury, with several Branches therefrom.
South Eastern Railway (Branch to Tunbridge Wells) Act 1845	8 & 9 Vict. c. clxvii	31 July 1845
An Act to enable the South-eastern Railway Company to make or complete a Branch Railway from the South-eastern Railway at Tunbridge to Tunbridge Wells.
Gravesend and Rochester Railway and Canal Act 1845	8 & 9 Vict. c. clxviii	31 July 1845
An Act to enable the Company of Proprietors of the Thames and Medway Canal to raise a further Sum of Money; and to amend the Acts relating to the said Company; and to enable the said Company to widen, extend, and maintain a Railway from Gravesend to Rochester.
Newport and Pontypool Railway Act 1845	8 & 9 Vict. c. clxix	31 July 1845
An Act to authorize the Company of Proprietors of the Monmouthshire Canal Navigation to make a Railway from Newport to Ponty Pool; and to enlarge the Powers of the several Acts relating to the said Company.
Scottish Midland Junction Railway Act 1845	8 & 9 Vict. c. clxx	31 July 1845
An Act for making a Railway for the City or Royal Burgh of Perth to or near to the Town or Royal Burgh of Forfar.
Manchester and Leeds Railway Act (No. 1) 1845 or the Manchester and Leeds Railway (No. 1) Act 1845	8 & 9 Vict. c. clxxi	31 July 1845
An Act to enable the Manchester and Leeds Railway Company to raise an additional Sum of Money and to amend the several Acts relating to the said Company.
Wakefield, Pontefract and Goole Railway Act 1845	8 & 9 Vict. c. clxxii	31 July 1845
An Act for making a Railway from the Manchester and Leeds Railway at Wakefield to the Towns of Pontefract and Goole, with certain Branches therefrom.
Falmouth Harbour Act 1845	8 & 9 Vict. c. clxxiii	31 July 1845
An Act for deepening, regulating, and otherwise improving Falmouth Harbour in the County of Cornwall, and for forming Basins, Docks, and other Works in Penryn Creek in the aforesaid Harbour; and for other Purposes.
Cromford Canal Act 1845	8 & 9 Vict. c. clxxiv	31 July 1845
An Act to alter and amend some of the Provisions of the Acts relating to the Cromford Canal.
Sheffield Water Act 1845 (repealed)	8 & 9 Vict. c. clxxv	31 July 1845
An Act for better supplying with Water the Town and Parish of Sheffield in the County of York; and for amending the Act (Note: Sheffield Water Act 1830 (11 Geo. 4 & 1 Will. 4. c. lv)) relating thereto. (Repealed by Sheffield Waterworks Act 1853 (16 & 17 Vict. c. xxii))
Saint Helens Improvement Act 1845 or the St. Helens Improvement Act 1845 (repealed)	8 & 9 Vict. c. clxxvi	31 July 1845
An Act for paving, lighting, cleansing, watering, regulating, and otherwise improving the Town of Saint Helens in the County Palatine of Lancaster, and for establishing and regulating a Market therein. (Repealed by Saint Helens Improvement Act 1851 (14 & 15 Vict. c. cxxxii))
Bermondsey Improvement Act 1845	8 & 9 Vict. c. clxxvii	31 July 1845
An Act for more effectually paving, cleansing, lighting, and otherwise improving the Parish of Saint Mary Magdalen Bermondsey in the County of Surrey.
Westminster Improvement Act 1845	8 & 9 Vict. c. clxxviii	31 July 1845
An Act for improving Parts of the City of Westminster.
Tacumshin Embankment Act 1845	8 & 9 Vict. c. clxxix	31 July 1845
An Act for embanking and reclaiming from the Sea certain Lands now under Water or subject to be overflowed by the Tide in the Lake, Lough, or Estuary called Tacumshin otherwise Tacumshin Lake, in the County of Wexford.
St. Matthew's Church, Bethnal Green Act 1845 (repealed)	8 & 9 Vict. c. clxxx	31 July 1845
An Act for extinguishing Garden Pennies, Small Tithes, and Easter Offerings within the Parish of Saint Matthew Bethnal Green in the County of Middlesex, and for providing a Fund for the Payment of the Stipend of the Rector of the said Parish. (Repealed by London Government (Borough of Bethnal Green) Order in Council 1901 (SR&O 1901/212))
Leeds and Bradford Railway Act 1845	8 & 9 Vict. c. clxxxi	4 August 1845
An Act to rectify a Mistake in an Act of the present Session relating to the Leeds and Bradford Railway.
Glasgow Junction Railway Act 1845 (repealed)	8 & 9 Vict. c. clxxxii	4 August 1845
An Act for making a Railway to be called "The Glasgow Junction Railway," with Branches. (Repealed by Edinburgh and Glasgow Railway Consolidation Act 1852 (15 & 16 Vict. c. cix))
Birmingham and Gloucester Railway (Gloucester Extensions, &c.) Act 1845 or the Birmingham and Gloucester Railway Act 1845	8 & 9 Vict. c. clxxxiii	4 August 1845
An Act to enable the Birmingham and Gloucester Railway Company to make Extension Lines at Gloucester, a Branch at Stoke Prior, and a Junction with the Midland Railway at Aston juxta Birmingham.
Oxford, Worcester and Wolverhampton Railway Act 1845	8 & 9 Vict. c. clxxxiv	4 August 1845
An Act for making a Railway from Oxford to Worcester and Wolverhampton.
London and South-western Railway Company's Amendment Act 1845 or the London and South Western Railway Amendment Act 1845	8 & 9 Vict. c. clxxxv	4 August 1845
An Act to amend the Acts relating to the London and South-western Railway; and to authorize the London and South-western Railway Company to buy, and the Guildford Junction Railway Company to sell, the Guildford Junction Railway.
South Eastern Railway Act 1845	8 & 9 Vict. c. clxxxvi	4 August 1845
An Act to enable the South-eastern Railway Company to widen certain Parts of the London and Greenwich Railway.
Londonderry and Coleraine Railway Act 1845 (repealed)	8 & 9 Vict. c. clxxxvii	4 August 1845
An Act for making a Railway from Londonderry to Coleraine, with a Branch to Newtown Limavady. (Repealed by Londonderry and Coleraine Railway Arrangements Act 1859 (22 & 23 Vict. c. cxxxi))
Oxford and Rugby Railway Act 1845	8 & 9 Vict. c. clxxxviii	4 August 1845
An Act for making a Railway from the City of Oxford to the Town of Rugby.
Erewash Valley Railway Act 1845	8 & 9 Vict. c. clxxxix	4 August 1845
An Act for making a Railway from the Midland Railway in the Parish of Sawley in the County of Derby to the Parish of Alfreton in the same County, together with several Branch Railways communicating therewith, to be called "The Erewash Valley Railway."
South Wales Railway Act 1845	8 & 9 Vict. c. cxc	4 August 1845
An Act for making a Railway to be called "The South Wales Railway."
Monmouth and Hereford Railway Act 1845	8 & 9 Vict. c. cxci	4 August 1845
An Act for making a Railway from Monmouth to Hereford, with Branches therefrom to Westbury, and to join the Forest of Dean Railway.
Glasgow, Barrhead and Neilston Direct Railway Act 1845 or the Glasgow, Barrhead and Neilston Railway Act 1845	8 & 9 Vict. c. cxcii	4 August 1845
An Act for making a Railway from Glasgow to Crofthead near the Town or Village of Neilston, to be called "The Glasgow, Barrhead, and Neilston Direct Railway."
Dublin Water Supply Act 1845	8 & 9 Vict. c. cxciii	4 August 1845
An Act to amend the Acts for regulating the Pipe Water of the City of Dublin, and to enable the Lord Mayor, Aldermen, and Burgesses of the Borough of the City of Dublin to extend the Supply of Pipe Water to the several Parishes or Portion of Parishes situate in the City and County of Dublin, and adjoining to the Borough of the said City of Dublin, but outside the Boundary thereof.
Duddeston and Nechells Improvement Act 1845 (repealed)	8 & 9 Vict. c. cxciv	4 August 1845
An Act for lighting, draining, cleansing, and improving the Hamlets or Liberties of Duddeston and Nechells in the Parish of Aston near Birmingham in the County of Warwick. (Repealed by Birmingham Improvement Act 1851 (14 & 15 Vict. c. xciii))
Road from Glasgow to Yoker Bridge Act 1845	8 & 9 Vict. c. cxcv	4 August 1845
An Act for more effectually maintaining, improving, and repairing the Road leading from the City of Glasgow to Yoker Bridge, and certain Roads communicating therewith.
London and Croydon Railway Act 1845	8 & 9 Vict. c. cxcvi	8 August 1845
An Act to enable the London and Croydon Railway Company to widen and improve the London and Croydon Railway, and also a Portion of the London and Greenwich Railway.
South Eastern Railway Act 1845	8 & 9 Vict. c. cxcvii	8 August 1845
An Act to enable the South-eastern Railway Company to alter and extend the Canterbury, Ramsgate, and Margate Branch of the said South-eastern Railway, and to make a Branch therefrom to Deal, and to purchase the Canterbury and Whitstable Railway; and for other Purposes connected with the said Railway.
Grand Junction Railway Act 1845 (repealed)	8 & 9 Vict. c. cxcviii	8 August 1845
An Act for consolidating the Bolton and Leigh, the Kenyon and Leigh Junction, the Liverpool and Manchester, and the Grand Junction Railway Companies. (Repealed by London and North Western Railway Act 1846 (9 & 10 Vict. c. cciv))
Railway from Portsmouth to Chichester Act 1845	8 & 9 Vict. c. cxcix	8 August 1845
An Act for making a Railway from the Brighton and Chichester Railway to Portsmouth, with a Branch to Fareham.
Brighton, Lewes and Hastings Railway (Hastings, Rye and Ashford Extension) Act 1845	8 & 9 Vict. c. cc	8 August 1845
An Act to enable the Brighton, Lewes, and Hastings Railway Company to make a Railway from Bulverhithe in the County of Sussex to Ashford in the County of Kent.
Cambridge and Huntingdon Railway Act 1845 (repealed)	8 & 9 Vict. c. cci	8 August 1845
An Act for enabling the Eastern Counties Railway Company to make a Railway from Cambridge to Huntingdon. (Repealed by Great Eastern Railway Act 1862 (25 & 26 Vict. c. ccxxiii))
Grimsby Docks Act 1845 (repealed)	8 & 9 Vict. c. ccii	8 August 1845
An Act for making additional Docks and other Works at the Haven of the Town and Port of Great Grimsby; and for amending the Acts relating to the said Haven. (Repealed by Manchester, Sheffield and Lincolnshire Railway Act 1849 (12 & 13 Vict. c. lxxxi))
London and Blackwall Extension Railway Act 1845	8 & 9 Vict. c. cciii	9 August 1845
An Act for making a Railway from the London and Blackwall Railway at Stepney to the Eastern Counties Railway.
Bristol Rates Act 1845 (repealed)	8 & 9 Vict. c. cciv	9 August 1845
An Act for removing Doubts relating to the Collection of certain Portions of the Borough Rates of the City and County of Bristol. (Repealed by Statute Law (Repeals) Act 2008 (c. 12))

=== Private acts ===
Short title	Citation	Royal assent
Long title
Charles Calvert's Estates Act 1845	8 & 9 Vict. c. 1 Pr.	20 May 1845
An Act for the disposing of Part of the Estates the late Charles Calvert Esquire, in pursuance the Directions of a certain Decree of the High of Chancery, and for confirming the Sale of such thereof as have been sold.
Foulmire Inclosure Act 1845	8 & 9 Vict. c. 2 Pr.	20 May 1845
An Act for inclosing Lands in the Parish of Foulmire in the County of Cambridge.
Duke of Argyll's Estate Act 1845	8 & 9 Vict. c. 3 Pr.	30 June 1845
An Act to empower John Douglas Edward Henry Duke of Argyll to charge the Dukedom and Estate of Argyll with certain Provisions to the Marchioness of Lorne, and to the younger Children of the Marriage between her and the Marquis of Lorne.
William Molyneux's Estate Act 1845	8 & 9 Vict. c. 4 Pr.	30 June 1845
An Act for amending an Act of Parliament passed in the Fourth and Fifth Years of the Reign of His late Majesty King William the Fourth, intituled "An Act for confirming and carrying into effect a Partition and Division of the Real and Personal Estate of William Molyneux Esquire, deceased, and for other Purposes therein mentioned." (Note: William Molyneux's Estate Act 1834 (4 & 5 Will. 4. c. 19 Pr.))
Percy Barrington and Louisa Higgins Marriage Settlement Act 1845	8 & 9 Vict. c. 5 Pr.	30 June 1845
An Act for enabling the Honourable Percy Barrington Second Son of the Right Honourable William Keppel Viscount Barrington, a Minor, and Louisa Higgins, Spinster, also a Minor, to execute Settlements of the Fortune of the said Louisa Higgins, prior to and in contemplation of the Marriage between the said Percy Barrington and the said Louisa Higgins.
Leicester Freemen's Act 1845 or the St. Mary's Leicester Inclosure (Amendment) Act 1845	8 & 9 Vict. c. 6 Pr.	30 June 1845
An Act to repeal so much of an Act (Note: St. Mary's, Leicester Inclosure Act 1804 (44 Geo. 3. c. 16 Pr.)) for inclosing Lands in the Parish of Saint Mary in or near the Borough of Leicester as relates to the Regulation and Management of the Freemen's Allotments; and to make other Provisions in lieu thereof.
St. Mary's Nottingham Inclosure Act 1845 or the Nottingham Inclosure Act 1845	8 & 9 Vict. c. 7 Pr.	30 June 1845
An Act for inclosing Lands in the Parish of Saint Mary in the Town and County of the Town of Nottingham.
Spoad, Trevorward, Perlogue, Menutton, Pentrehodrey, Hobarris and Hobendrid (Clun) (Salop.) Inclosure Act 1845	8 & 9 Vict. c. 8 Pr.	30 June 1845
An Act for inclosing Lands in the Townships of Spoad, Treverward, Purlogue, Menutton, Pentrehodrey, Hobarris, and Hobendrid, in the Parish of Clun within the Manor or Lordship of Clun in the County of Salop.
Winwick (Lancashire) Parish Division (Amendment) Act 1845	8 & 9 Vict. c. 9 Pr.	21 July 1845
An Act to amend an Act passed in the Fourth Year of the Reign of Her present Majesty, intituled "An Act for the Division of the Rectory of Winwick in the County Palatine of Lancaster." (Note: Division of Winwick Rectory (Lancashire) Act 1841 (4 & 5 Vict. c. 9 Pr.))
William Turner's Estate Act 1845	8 & 9 Vict. c. 10 Pr.	21 July 1845
An Act for authorizing Building Leases to be granted of Parts of the Estate devised by the Will of William Turner Esquire, deceased, the Investment of Monies bequeathed by the same Will in the Purchase or on Mortgage of Real Estates, and for other Purposes.
Kidwelly, St. Mary's in Kidwelly, St. Ishmael and Pembrey (Carmarthenshire) Inclosure Act 1845	8 & 9 Vict. c. 11 Pr.	21 July 1845
An Act to alter and amend an Act of the Eleventh Year of King George the Fourth (Note: Kidwelly, St. Mary Kidwelly, St. Ishmael and Pembrey (Carmarthenshire) Inclosure Act 1830 (11 Geo. 4 & 1 Will. 4. c. 16 Pr.)) for inclosing Lands in the Parishes of Kidwelly, Saint Mary in Kidwelly, Saint Ishmael, and Pembrey, in the County of Carmarthen.
Morden College (Kent) Act 1845	8 & 9 Vict. c. 12 Pr.	31 July 1845
An Act to extend the Provisions of an Act of the Eleventh Year of King George the Third, Chapter Ten, (Note: Morden College, Kent Act 1771 (11 Geo. 3. c. 10)) relating to Morden College.
John Hawkins' Estate Act 1845	8 & 9 Vict. c. 13 Pr.	31 July 1845
An Act to authorize Grants in Fee and Leases for long Terms of Years for Building Purposes of the Settled Estate of John Hawkins Esquire, deceased, situate in Cheetham in the Parish of Manchester in the County of Lancaster.
Elizabeth and Harriet Ellerker's Estate Act 1845	8 & 9 Vict. c. 14 Pr.	31 July 1845
An Act to authorize the Sale of the Fee Simple of Part of the Settled Estates of Miss Elizabeth Mainwaring Ellerker and Miss Harriet Mainwaring Ellerker deceased, situate in the County of York, and for applying the Monies to arise by such Sale in Payment of Incumbrances affecting the said Estates, and laying out the Residue of such Monies in the Purchase of other Estates.
Frederick, Lord Monson's Estate Act 1845	8 & 9 Vict. c. 15 Pr.	31 July 1845
An Act for granting Building and Farming Leases of the Estates in Surrey devised by the Will of the Right Honourable Frederick John Lord Monson deceased; and for other Purposes.
Francis and John Gildart's Estate Act 1845	8 & 9 Vict. c. 16 Pr.	31 July 1845
An Act for vesting the Freehold and Copyhold Estates devised by the Wills of Francis Gildart and John Gildart, Esquires, deceased, in Trustees for Sale.
Sir Thomas White's Charity Estates Act 1845	8 & 9 Vict. c. 17 Pr.	4 August 1845
An Act to enable the Trustees of Sir Thomas White's Charity Estates in the City of Coventry to make Sale Part of such Charity Estates; and for other Purposes.
Richard Ellison's Estate Act 1845	8 & 9 Vict. c. 18 Pr.	4 August 1845
An Act for enabling Richard Ellison Esquire and his Trustees to grant Leases of the Fossdyke Navigation in the County of Lincoln; and for other Purposes.
Rochdale Glebe Lands Act 1845	8 & 9 Vict. c. 19 Pr.	4 August 1845
An Act to amend an Act of the Fourth Year of George the Third, (Note: Rochdale (Lancashire) Vicarage Glebe Lands Act 1764 (4 Geo. 3. c. 28 Pr.)) for enabling the Vicar of Rochdale in the County of Lancaster to grant a Lease or Leases of the Glebe Lands belonging to the Vicarage.
Winchester College Estate Act 1845	8 & 9 Vict. c. 20 Pr.	8 August 1845
An Act to enable the Warden and Scholars, Clerks of Saint Mary College of Winchester near Winchester, to carry into effect a Contract entered into by them for the Sale of certain Parts of the Estates belonging to the said College in the Isle of Wight, and to invest the Purchase Money in other Estates for the Benefit of the said College.
Sir Thomas Coxhead's Estate Act 1845	8 & 9 Vict. c. 21 Pr.	8 August 1845
21 An Act for vesting certain Lands and other Hereditaments devised by the Will of Sir Thomas Coxhead deceased in Trustees, upon trust to sell the same, and to grant Leases thereof for building and other Purposes.
William Robinson's Estate Act 1845	8 & 9 Vict. c. 22 Pr.	8 August 1845
An Act to enable the Trustees of the Will of the late William Henry Robinson Esquire to raise Money by way of Mortgage of his Real Estates, for the Purposes therein mentioned.
Sir Robert Dick Estates and Name Act 1845	8 & 9 Vict. c. 23 Pr.	8 August 1845
An Act to enable Sir Robert Keith Dick of Prestonfield Baronet, Heir of Entail in possession of the Entailed Estates of Prestonfield and Corstorphine in the County of Edinburgh, to feu and sell certain Parts of the said Estates, and to bear the Surname of Cunyngham and Arms of "Cunyngham of Lamburghtoun" alongst with the Surname and Arms of Dick of Prestonfield.
Thomas Molyneux's Estate Act 1845	8 & 9 Vict. c. 24 Pr.	8 August 1845
An Act to enable the Assignees of the Estate of Thomas Blayds Molyneux, a Bankrupt, to sell his Real Estates discharged from a Jointure, and certain Portions and Legacies charged thereon.
John Fletcher's Will Act 1845	8 & 9 Vict. c. 25 Pr.	8 August 1845
An Act to revive and extend the Powers of Sale and Exchange, and the Powers to make Conveyances in Fee and Demises for Building Purposes, respectively contained in the Will of John Rigby Fletcher Esquire, deceased, and to enable the Trustees to grant Leases of Coal and other Mines under the Lands devised by his said Will; and to authorize the Appointment of new Trustees of the Settlement thereby made of the Testator's Real Estate; and for other Purposes.
Earl of Strathmore's Estate Act 1845	8 & 9 Vict. c. 26 Pr.	8 August 1845
An Act for authorizing the Sale of certain Portions of the Real Estates devised by the Will and Codicils of John Bowes late Earl of Strathmore, and for authorizing the Purchase of other Real Estates, including Lands held for long Terms of Years, to be settled to the Uses of the said Will and Codicils, and for extending the Power of granting Mining Leases given by the said Will; and for other Purposes.
Birmingham Blue Coat Charity School's Estate Act 1845	8 & 9 Vict. c. 27 Pr.	8 August 1845
An Act to vest the Estates and Property constituting the Trust Estate of the Blue-Coat Charity School in Birmingham in the County of Warwick in new Trustees upon consolidated Trusts, and to provide for the Management of the said Estates and Property, and for the good Government of the said School; and for other Purposes.
John and Anna Maria Severne's and Others' Estates Act 1845	8 & 9 Vict. c. 28 Pr.	8 August 1845
An Act to carry into effect a Partition between John Michael Severne Esquire and Anna Maria his Wife, and others, of Estates in the Counties of Worcester, Salop, Warwick, Oxford, and Leicester.
Duke of Bridgewater's Estate Act 1845	8 & 9 Vict. c. 29 Pr.	8 August 1845
An Act to enable the Trustees of the Will of the Most Noble Francis late Duke of Bridgewater to carry into execution certain Articles of Agreement made and entered into by them with the Right Honourable Francis Egerton commonly called Lord Francis Egerton and to raise Money for the Purposes expressed in the said Articles of Agreement and for other Purposes.
Thomas Sampson's Estate Act 1845	8 & 9 Vict. c. 30 Pr.	8 August 1845
An Act for authorizing and enabling Sales to be made of Estates respectively situate in the Parishes of Evercreech, East Pennard, and in Bruton, and in other Parishes or Places in the County of Somerset, devised by the Will of Thomas Sampson Esquire, deceased; and for other Purposes.
Marquis of Donegall's Estate Act 1845	8 & 9 Vict. c. 31 Pr.	8 August 1845
An Act to authorize the Sale of Settled Estates of the Most Honourable the Marquis of Donegall in Ireland in order to pay off Mortgage and other Incumbrances.
Sir William Paston's Free School (Norfolk) Estate Act 1845	8 & 9 Vict. c. 32 Pr.	8 August 1845
An Act for carrying into effect a Contract between the Governors and Trustees of Sir William Paston's Free School at North Walsham in the County of Norfolk and Robert Rising Esquire, for the Sale to the said Robert Rising of an Estate belonging to the said Governors and Trustees, and for applying Part of the Purchase Money in discharge of certain Debts due from them, and investing the Surplus in the Purchase of other Estates, to be settled to the same Trusts.
Marquess of Westminster's Will Act 1845	8 & 9 Vict. c. 33 Pr.	9 August 1845
An Act for enlarging the Powers contained in the Will of the Most Honourable Robert Marquess of Westminster deceased to grant Building Leases of the Estates devised by the said Will, in the Parishes of Saint George Hanover Square and Saint John the Evangelist within the Liberty of Westminster in the County of Middlesex; and for other Purposes.
Thomas Britten's Divorce Act 1845 (Note: This act was not printed by the Queen's Printer)	8 & 9 Vict. c. 34 Pr.	24 April 1845
An Act to dissolve the Marriage of Thomas with Jane Britten his now Wife, and to enable him marry again; and for other Purposes.
Richard Heaviside's Divorce Act 1845	8 & 9 Vict. c. 35 Pr.	31 July 1845
An Act to dissolve the Marriage of Richard Heaviside Esquire with Mary his now Wife, and to enable him to marry again; and for other Purposes.
Thomas Shuldham's Divorce Act 1845	8 & 9 Vict. c. 36 Pr.	8 August 1845
An Act to dissolve the Marriage of Thomas Henry Shuldham Esquire with Frances Anne Hamilton Shuldham his now Wife; and for other Purposes.
Charles Boileau's Divorce Act 1845	8 & 9 Vict. c. 37 Pr.	8 August 1845
An Act to dissolve the Marriage of Charles Lestock Boileau Esquire with Margaret Boileau his now Wife, and to enable him to marry again; and for other Purposes.

=== Sources ===
- A Collection of the Public General Statutes passed in the Eighth and Ninth Years of the Reign of Queen Victoria. Eyre and Spottiswoode. 1845 – via Internet Archive.
- Simons, N., ed. (1845). "8° & 9° Victoriæ". The Statutes at Large. Vol. 17: Acts 7 & 8 Victoria (1844) and 8 & 9 Victoria (1845). London: Eyre and Spottiswoode. pp. 501–1136 – via Google Books.
- Simons, N., ed. (1845). "8° & 9° Victoriæ". The Statutes at Large. Vol. 17: Acts 7 & 8 Victoria (1844) and 8 & 9 Victoria (1845). London: Eyre and Spottiswoode. pp. 501–1136 – via Google Books.
- A Compendious Abstract of the Public General Acts. Vol. 23: 8 & 9 Victoriæ. London: E. B. Ince. 1845 – via Google Books.
- A Compendious Abstract of the Public General Acts. Vol. 23: 8 & 9 Victoriæ. London: E. B. Ince. 1845 – via Google Books.
- A Collection of the Public General Statutes passed in the Eighth and Ninth Year of the Reign of Her Majesty Queen Victoria. Eyre and Spottiswoode. 1845 – via Google Books.
- Journal of the House of Commons (PDF). Vol. 100. London: His Majesty's Stationery Office. pp. 3–918 – via parliament.uk.
- Chronological Table of and Index to the Statutes. Vol. 1: To the End of the Session 59 Vict. Sess. 2 (1895) (13th ed.). London: Her Majesty's Stationery Office. 1896. pp. 324–329 – via Google Books.
- Chronological Table of the Statutes: Covering the Period from 1235 to the End of 1971. London: Her Majesty's Stationery Office. 1972. pp. 340–353. ISBN 978-0-11-840096-1 – via Google Books.
- "Statutes of the United Kingdom of Great Britain and Ireland, 1845". Irish Statute Book. Office of the Attorney General, Government of Ireland.

== See also ==
- List of acts of the Parliament of the United Kingdom
