= Maynooth College Act 1845 =

Act of the Parliament of the United Kingdom

- Act of Parliament
- Parliament of the United Kingdom
- Long title: An Act to amend Two Acts passed in Ireland for the better Education of Persons professing the Roman Catholic Religion, and for the better Government of the College established at Maynooth for the Education of such Persons, and also an Act passed in the Parliament of the United Kingdom for amending the said Two Acts.
- Citation: 8 & 9 Vict. c. 25
- Territorial extent: United Kingdom

Dates
- Royal assent: 30 June 1845
- Commencement: 30 June 1845 (Note: The Acts of Parliament (Commencement) Act 1793.)
- Repealed: 31 January 2013
Other legislation
Amends	Maynooth College Act 1795; Maynooth College Act 1800; Maynooth Academy Act 1808
Repealed by	Statute Law (Repeals) Act 2013

Status: Repealed

Text of statute as originally enacted

The Maynooth College Act 1845 (8 & 9 Vict. c. 25) was an act of the Parliament of the United Kingdom.

St Patrick's College, Maynooth was established by the Maynooth College Act 1795 (35 Geo. 3. c. 21 (I)) as a seminary for Ireland's Catholic priests. The British government hoped this would help conciliate the Irish to British rule. In 1842 the Catholic hierarchy of Ireland requested that the grant to the College be increased. Matthew Flanagan, secretary to the Maynooth trustees, contacted the Chief Secretary for Ireland, Edward Eliot, arguing the case for increasing the grant. Eliot requested that the government should set up a committee of enquiry to investigate the College's inadequacies. The Cabinet discussed the Maynooth question on 7 November 1842 but the Prime Minister, Sir Robert Peel, decided that any commission would not have the confidence of both parties and it would be impossible to word terms of references acceptable to everyone. Eliot reported that the Maynooth trustees were willing to wait for a more favourable moment.

In October 1843 Eliot again raised the issue against the background of Daniel O'Connell's movement for the repeal of the Union. In 1843 agitation had suddenly flared up again but British public opinion at this time was generally anti-Catholic and it was not certain that it would support an increased grant to Maynooth. Lord Stanley wrote to Peel, supporting the appointment of a commission because it might "render familiar ideas which at present would not even be permitted to be discussed".

On 11 February 1844 Peel submitted a memorandum to the Cabinet where he predicted that the Whigs would attack the government over the state of Ireland in the debates scheduled for 13 February. Peel advocated appointing a commission to investigate the educational standards of the College and supported an increased grant. On 13 February the Cabinet discussed appointing a commission but due to the divisions between Cabinet members Peel postponed a decision.

On 17 February Peel despatched another memorandum to Cabinet members, stating that Ireland caused him "great anxiety" and that they should make reforms now while it was still safe to do so. Peel pointed to historical parallels to demonstrate that resisting reforms eventually led to enforced concessions on the part of the government. He also added that law and order in Ireland depended on the co-operation of the Catholics and that every concession apart from disestablishing the Church of Ireland and repealing the Union should be made to improve Anglo-Irish relations. The Cabinet discussed the memorandum on 19 February without coming to a decision, with Peel remarking as he left the room: "Depend upon it, the attack upon the Church of Ireland can only be staved off by liberal concessions".

Peel submitted a third memorandum at the end of February, arguing that with O'Connell's repeal movement weakened by government action and with agitation declining, now was the time to make concessions to moderate Catholics. Peel warned that another such favourable opportunity of settling the Irish question might never return. The Home Secretary, Sir James Graham, spent the autumn researching the issue and submitted to the Cabinet in November a memorandum supporting raising the grant. By March 1845 Graham had finalised a Bill embodying his recommendations. On 3 April Peel delivered a speech in the Commons supporting the bill.

The bill increased the annual grant to the college from £9,000 to £26,000, along with a one off grant of £30,000 for new buildings. The Board of Works was made responsible for the cost of repairs and maintenance. The Bill also introduced annual visitations.

On 11 April the six-day debate on the bill's second reading began, with liberal Conservatives, the Whigs and the Irish supporting the bill and ultra-Protestant Conservatives and Radicals speaking against. On 16 April the Radical MP John Bright criticised the bill:

Does Irish discontent arise because the priests of Maynooth are now insufficiently clad or fed? I have always thought that it arose because one-third of the people were paupers. I can easily see how, by the granting of this sum, you might hear far less in future times of the sufferings and wrongs of the people of Ireland than you have heard heretofore. For you find that one large means of influence possessed by those who have agitated for the redress of Irish wrongs is the support which the Irish Catholic clergy have given to the various associations for carrying on political agitation. And the object of this Bill is to tame down these agitators—it is a sop given to the priests. It is hush-money, given that they may not proclaim to the whole country, to Europe and to the world, the sufferings of the population to whom they administer the rites and the consolations of religion.

He claimed that the established Protestant Church of Ireland was the root cause of Irish discontent but because the government was unwilling to disestablish it their "object is to take away the sympathy of the Catholic priests from the people. The object is to make the priests in Ireland as tame as those in Suffolk and Dorsetshire. The object is that when the horizon is brightened every night by incendiary fires, no priest of the paid establishment shall ever tell of the wrongs of the people among whom he is living".

After the six day debate on the bill, it passed by a majority of 147. Three Conservatives resigned in protest against the bill: William Ewart Gladstone (President of the Board of Trade), Lord Redesdale (Conservative chief whip in the Lords) and Alex Pringle (a junior Treasury minister). The historian Norman Gash argued that the bill shattered the morale of the Conservative Party and that the damage done to the Party by the bill was "incalculable" because it undermined the relationship between Church and State on which it had been built in the 1830s. On the vote for the second reading Conservative MPs voted 159 in favour, 147 against. On the third reading Conservatives voted 148 voted in favour, 149 against. However, four-fifths of Liberal MPs voted in favour, giving the bill large majorities.

There was a resurgence of anti-Catholicism against the bill, with petitions hostile to the proposals and public meetings against them held across Britain. An anti-Maynooth Conference was held at Exeter Hall where a committee was set up to fight the bill. James Thursfield claimed that "the whole country overflowed with bigotry and fanaticism" against it.

== Bibliography ==
- Beckett, J. C. (1981). The Making of Modern Ireland 1603–1923. London: Faber and Faber.
- Gash, Norman (1972). Sir Robert Peel: The Life of Sir Robert Peel after 1830. London: Longman.
- Kitson Clark, G. (1936). Peel. London: Duckworth.
- Thursfield, J. R. (1891). Peel. London: Macmillan.
- Trevelyan, G. M. (1913). The Life of John Bright. London: Constable.
