= Maynooth College Act 1795 =

Act of the Parliament of Ireland

Maynooth College Act 1795 (Note: Short title given by the Statute Law Revision Act 2007 (No. 28))
- Act of Parliament
- Parliament of Ireland
- Long title: An Act for the better Education of Persons professing the Popish, or Roman Catholick Religion.
- Citation: 35 Geo. 3. c. 21 (I)
- Territorial extent: Ireland

Dates
- Royal assent: 5 June 1795
- Commencement: 5 June 1795 (Note: The Acts of Parliament (Commencement) Act (Ireland) 1795.)

Other legislation
- Amends: Statute Law Revision (Ireland) Act 1879
- Amended by: Maynooth College Act 1845

Status: Amended

Text of statute as originally enacted

The Maynooth College Act 1795 (35 Geo. 3. c. 21 (I)) was an act of the Parliament of Ireland that established and arranged the funding for St Patrick's College, Maynooth as Ireland's Catholic seminary.

Irish Catholic priests had traditionally been educated on the Continent in seminaries but in the aftermath of the French Revolution and during its ensuing wars many of these seminaries were either closed down or became inaccessible. Bishops were also worried that students on the Continent might become exposed to the "contagion of sedition and infidelity". The Dublin Castle administration had supported the passage of the Roman Catholic Relief Act 1793 but was opposed to full Catholic emancipation.

== Subsequent developments ==
The act was substantially repealed by section 1 of, and the schedule, to the Statute Law Revision (Ireland) Act 1879 (42 & 43 Vict. c. 24).

== See also ==
- Maynooth College Act 1845
