= Melleray =

Mellerayor Mellaray may refer to:

- Melleray, Sarthe, a commune of the Sarthe département in France
- La Meilleraye-de-Bretagne, a commune of the Loire-Atlantique département in France
- Melleray Abbey, in La Meilleraye-de-Bretagne
- Mount Melleray Abbey, on the slopes of the Knockmealdown Mountains, near Cappoquin, Waterford
- Mount Melleray
- New Melleray Abbey, near Dubuque, Iowa
