= Brendan Devlin =

Irish language scholar (1931–2023)

Brendan P. Devlin (Irish: Breandán Ó Doibhlin) (29 May 1931 – 19 September 2023) was an Irish language scholar and priest of the Derry Diocese. He was one for five children born in Rousky, County Tyrone, Northern Ireland and was educated in St Columb's College, Derry, St Patrick's College, Maynooth, and the Pontifical Irish College in Rome. One of his brothers, Kieran, also served as a priest of the Diocese of Derry.

In 1958, he became professor of modern languages at St Patrick's College, Maynooth, a position he held until he retired in 1996. He additionally held the post of Vice-President from 1977 to 1980. On 2 September 2013 he was the principal celebrant at the funeral of the poet Seamus Heaney.

== Academic career ==
As a polyglot and teacher, Devlin was particularly known for his work in French and in Irish. For many years, he was rector of the Irish College in Paris and also published three novels in Irish: Néal Maidine agus Tine Oíche (1964), An Branar gan Cur (1979), and Sliocht ar Thír na Scáth (2018). He has also published translations from French into Irish by La Fontaine, Pascal and Saint-Exupery. He translated several books of the Bible into Irish.

In addition to French, Devlin learned Polish, reputedly for use in the negotiations involved in bringing the Irish College in Paris back from the control of the Polish church who had used it for many decades.

In total, he spent 74 years at Maynooth College.

== Irish College, Paris ==
Devlin worked for four decades to reestablish the Irish connection to the Irish College in Paris, and its redevelopment and renovation as the Irish Cultural Institute, and Irish Chaplaincy in Paris. Devlin had visited the Paris college in 1963, when there was no Irish presence there and it was used as a Polish seminary; he resolved to reinstate it as an asset to the Irish people. He was appointed rector of the Irish College by Cardinal O'Fiach in 1984.

In 2001, Devlin was invested as an Officer of the Légion d'honneur, the highest French award available to a foreign national.

Devlin died at Connolly Hospital in Blanchardstown on 19 September 2023, at the age of 92.

Academic offices
Preceded by Rev. Thomas Fagan CM	Rector of Irish College in Paris; 1984–2001	Succeeded by
Preceded by Rev. Michael Olden	Vice-President St. Patrick's College, Maynooth; 1977–1980; With: Rev. Denis O'Callaghan	Succeeded by Rev. Matthew O'Donnell; Rev. Micheál Ledwith
