= Bruno Fitzpatrick =

Irish Cistercian abbot

Bruno Fitzpatrick OSCO (1813-1893), was an Irish Cistercian monk who served as abbot of Mount Melleray Abbey in County Waterford from 1848 until his death in 1893. He founded New Melleray Abbey in the US, and Mount St. Joseph's Abbey in Roscrea.

== Life ==
Bartholomew Fitzpatrick was born on 5 April 1813 at Boardstown, Mullingar, County Westmeath, Ireland, the son of Thomas Fitzpatrick and Elizabeth Taylor. His family moved to Trim, County Meath, where his father worked as a doctor.

Fitzpatrick was educated at St Sulpice (studying classics) and the Irish College at Paris (divinity studies). Too young for ordination, he was appointed while a professor of philosophy in St. Patrick's, Carlow College in 1836 until he was ordained for the Archdiocese of Dublin. He entered Mount Melleray Abbey in May 1843.

In 1849, Dr. Fitzpatrick acquired 1000 acres of land in Iowa, and New Melleray Abbey was established.

Dom Fitzpatrick assisted at the Synod of Thurles as a mitred abbot; he was the only one among priors, abbots and superiors who were entitled to vote at the synod.

Dom Bruno died on 4 December 1893 in Mount Melleray and is buried in the cemetery there.
