= Synod of Thurles =

Gathering of Catholic bishops, 1850

The Synod of Thurles was a synod of clergy the Catholic Church in Ireland held in 1850 in St. Patrick's College, Thurles in County Tipperary. It was the first formal Irish Catholic synod since that of 1642 during the Confederation of Kilkenny. Thurles was the seat of the Roman Catholic Archdiocese of Cashel and Emly, with the original in Cashel and in Emly being owned by the Church of Ireland. The Synod was called by Paul Cullen as apostolic delegate to Ireland and Archbishop of Armagh. Proceedings commenced on Thursday, 22 August 1850.

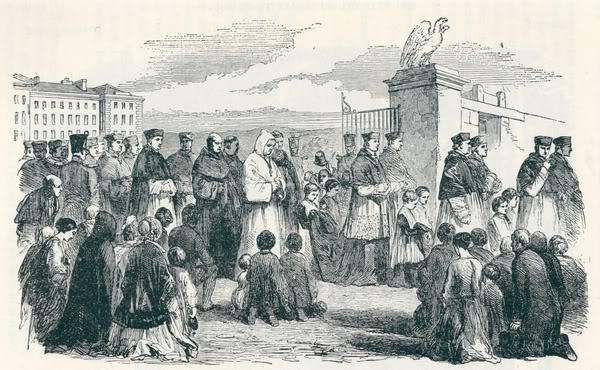
The clergy process to the synod of Thurles.

The synod marked the beginning of a movement led by Cullen to standardise the administration, religious practices, teaching and discipline of the Catholic church in Ireland. Practices in the Church in Ireland had evolved differently from practices in continental Europe due to state suppression of the Church in Ireland from the c. 1640 until Catholic emancipation in 1829. In advance of the synod, Cullen had been in Rome where he was appointed an Apostolic Delegate which in effect give him direct papal authority over the Catholic church in Ireland. Cullen was an 'ultramontanist' in philosophy and was committed to bringing the church in Ireland into line with the church in Rome. In particular, Cullen was opposed to local or popular religious expression and interpretation; he was determined to end such practices in Ireland. The synod also occurred at a sensitive time following the devastation of the Great Irish famine. Counteracting proselytising efforts by the protestant churches were also discussed.

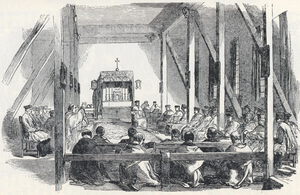
The clergy meeting in synod.

Along with the twenty seven bishops in attendance, the abbot of Mount Melleray Abbey, Dom Bruno Fitzpatrick was entitled to vote at the synod.

One of the main commitments from the Synod was to establish a Catholic University in Ireland in response to the establishment of the Queen's Colleges and the Queen's University of Ireland by the Queen's Colleges (Ireland) (No. 2) Act 1845 (8 & 9 Vict. c. 66) by the British Government. The bishops adopted the papal condemnation of the 'godless colleges' (i.e. the Queen's colleges) but were divided over priests accepting college positions and lay involvement. The consequence was the Catholic University of Ireland established in 1851 and the invitation from the bishops to Cardinal John Henry Newman to become its chancellor and its foundation in 1854.

Decrees of the Plenary Synod of the Bishops of Ireland (Decreta Synodi Plenariae Episcoporum Hiberniae) was published in 1851 following the synod.
