= Hugh Connolly =

Hugh Connolly may refer to:

- Hugh Connolly (footballer), Irish footballer
- Hugh Connolly (priest) (born 1961), Irish priest
