= Thomas Dease =

Irish Catholic bishop

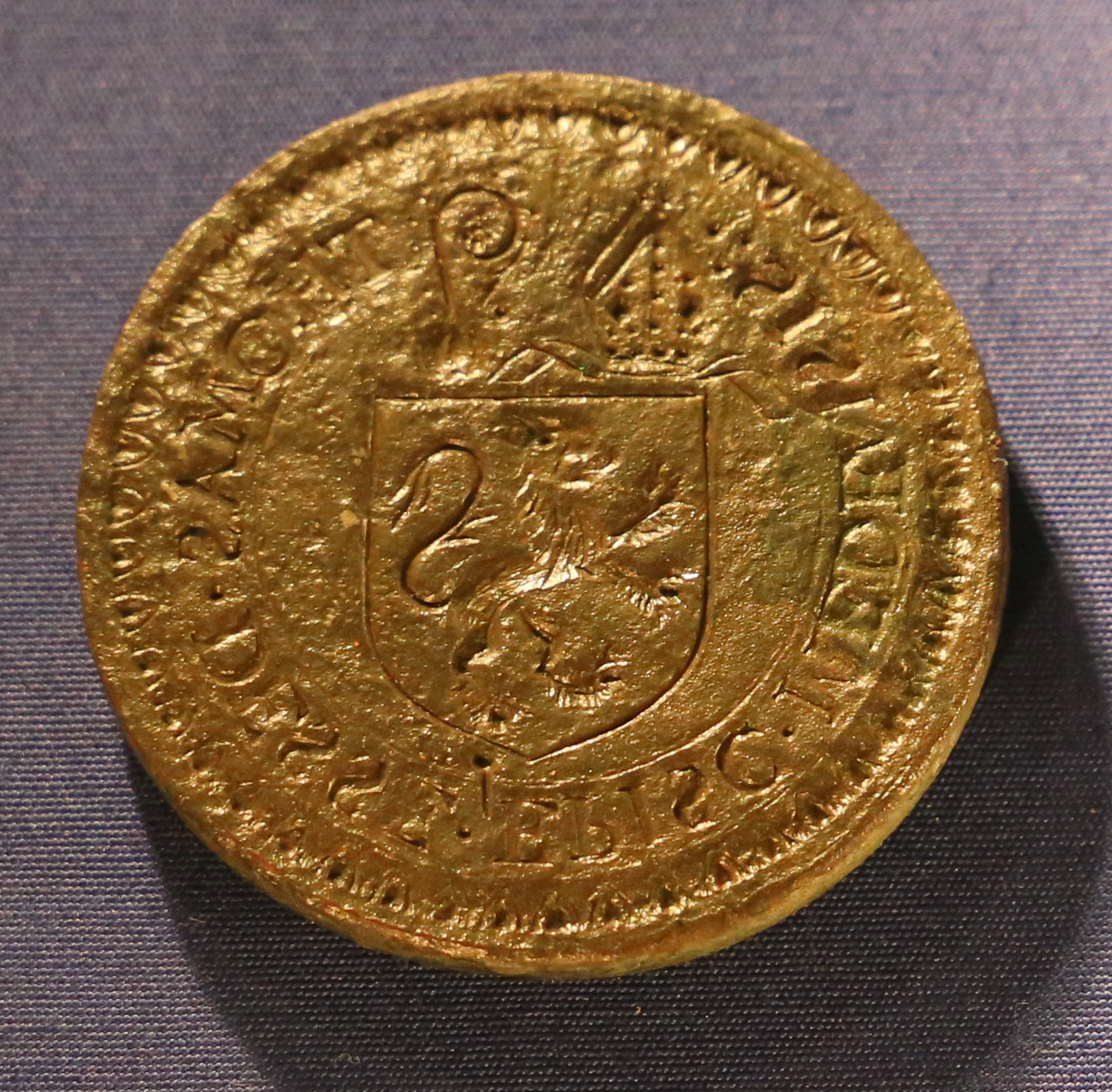
Seal of Thomas Dease

Thomas Dease was at one time Roman Catholic Bishop of Meath.

He was born in Ireland in 1568 and died in Galway in 1651. He sprang from an ancient Irish family at one time possessing considerable landed property in County Cavan and County Westmeath. In youth, he acquired some proficiency in the Irish language, in which language he wrote some poems. Having determined to become a priest, he proceeded to Paris, where after ordination he spent the first years of his priesthood. During this time he became rector of the Irish College in Paris. Dease returned to Ireland in 1621, having been appointed Bishop of Meath. Thomas Messingham succeeded him as rector.

He was consecrated the following year. In spite of persecution and penal laws, he continued loyal to England and preached loyalty to his flock. He regarded with disfavour the Confederation of Kilkenny, and resisted all the arguments and entreaties of the primate to join it. This conduct brought him toleration, if not favour, from the Government, though it made him unpopular with his Catholic fellow-countrymen. And it especially annoyed the nuncio, Giovanni Battista Rinuccini, who charged him with having sown the seeds of enmity between the Confederate generals Thomas Preston and Owen Roe O'Neill. The news of Dease's death was therefore received, in 1648, by the nuncio with little regret. But the news turned out false, and the nuncio writing to Rome reported that the bishop still lived "to try the patience of the good".
