= Robin Boyd =

Robin Boyd may refer to:

- Robin Boyd (architect) (1919–1971), Australian architect, writer, teacher and social commentator
- Robin Boyd (theologian) (1924–2018), Irish theologian and missionary to India
