= James Gallagher (bishop) =

The Most Rev. James Gallagher (died 1751), was a Roman Catholic bishop.

== Life ==
Gallagher was a member of the Ulster sept of Ó Galchobhair, anglicised Gallagher. He was born about 1684, possibly near Kinlough, a village in the north of County Leitrim in the north of Connacht, and was educated at the Irish College in Paris, where he received an MA in 1715. He entered the priesthood of the Catholic Church, and was consecrated Bishop of Raphoe, whose diocese covered most of County Donegal, in November 1725 at Drogheda.

Bishop Gallagher administered his diocese, the Diocese of Raphoe, until 1735, when he left due to threats to his safety in regards to the Penal Laws. It has been reported that he went to an island in Lough Erne, where he worked on the sermons which he published the following year. In May 1737, Gallagher was translated from the bishopric of Raphoe to that of Kildare, and in the same year he was appointed administrator of the Diocese of Leighlin.

In April 1741, Bishop Gallagher, then at Paris, was one of four bishops who gave a certificate of approval regarding Andrew Donlevy's Irish-English catechism of the Christian Doctrine. This work, with Gallagher's certificate prefixed, was printed in the following year at Paris by James Guerin.

Gallagher succeeded in evading the Penal Laws against Catholic ecclesiastics, and died in May 1751.

== Works ==
In 1736 he published in Dublin Sixteen Irish Sermons, in an easy and familiar style, on useful and necessary subjects, in English characters, as being the more familiar to the generality of our Irish clergy. In his preface the author mentioned that he had composed those discourses principally for the use of his fellow labourers, to be preached to their respective flocks, as his repeated troubles debarred him "of the comfort of delivering them in person". He added:

I have made them in an easy and familiar style, and of purpose omitted cramp expressions which be obscure to both the preacher and hearer. Nay, instead of such, I have sometimes made use of words borrowed from the English which practice and daily conversation have intermixed with our language.

Several editions of his sermons were published, the latest of which was issued in Dublin in 1877, with an English translation.
