= John Baptist Walsh =

Irish cleric and administrator

John Baptist Walsh (c. 1750–1825) was an Irish cleric and administrator of the Irish College in Paris. He was awarded an MA in 1773, an LTh in 1780, and charged as supervisor of clerics from Ulster at the college from 1774 to 1789, and gained the DTh award; he was appointed superior in 1787 a position he held until 1815.

He convinced Napoleon to consolidate the interests of the Scots and English Colleges into the Irish College, under the Fondation Irlandais, to rename rue du Cheval Vert to rue des Irlandais where the Collège des Irlandais is. The appointment of Rev. Richard Ferris as superior of the United Colleges challenged Dr. Walsh's influence.

== See also ==
- Irish College in Paris
