= Irish College in Paris =

Roman Catholic educational establishment for Irish students

Coordinates: 48.8440412°N 2.3459544°E

Irish College Paris
- French: Collège des Irlandais, Paris
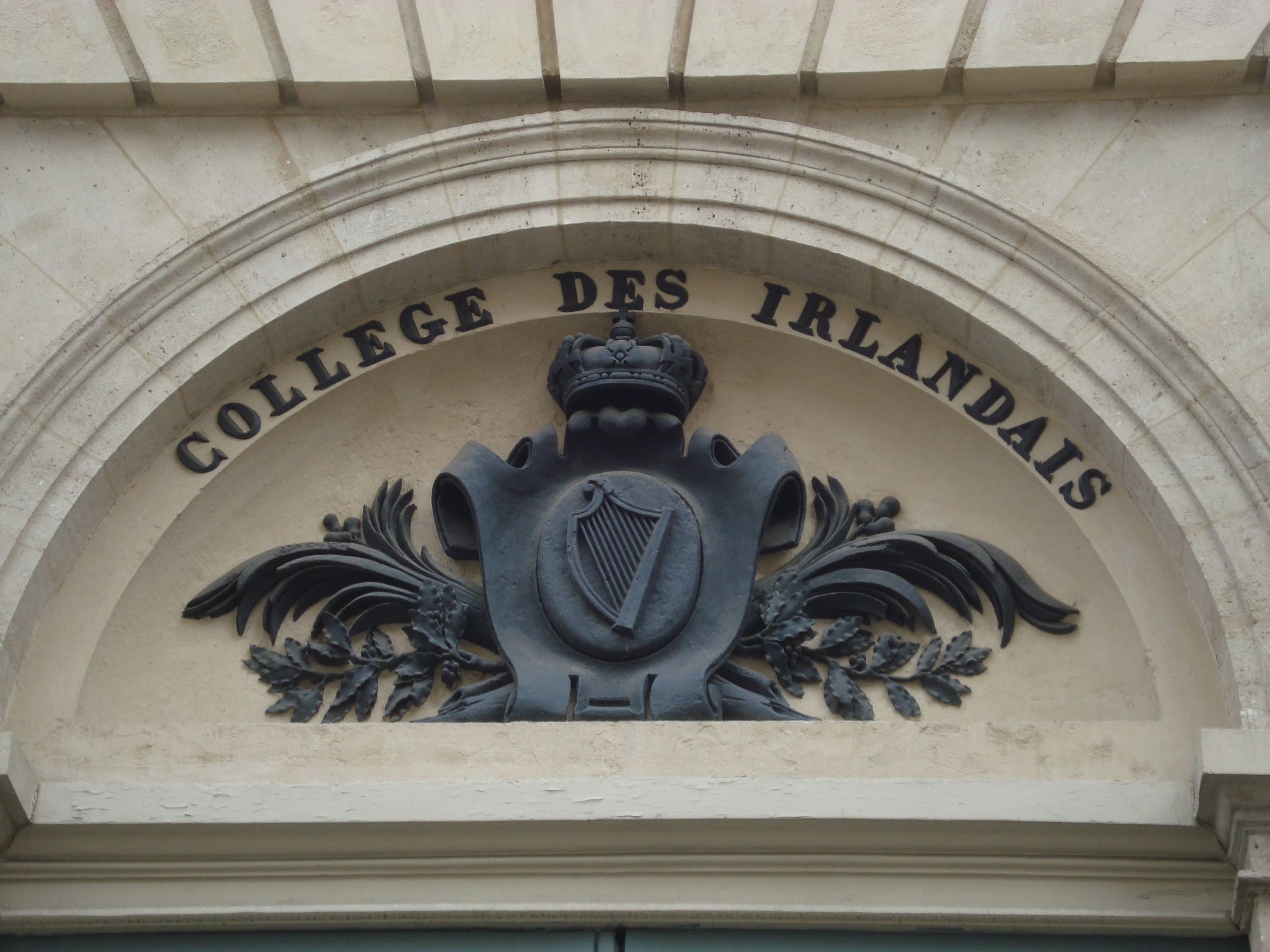
- Collège des Irlandais/Centre Culturel Irlandais
- Other names: Irish: Coláiste na nGael, Páris
- Type: Seminary
- Established: 1578
- Founder: John Lee
- Religious affiliation: Roman Catholic
- Academic affiliations: University of Paris (1624–1792)
- Location: Collège des Lombards (fr), Rue des Carmes (fr), Paris. (1677–1792); Rue des Irlandais (fr), Paris (Since 1769)
- Stewardship: Irish Vincentians(1858–1984)
- Managed by: La Fondation Irlandaise (1805–present)
- Irish College Paris

The Irish College in Paris (Irish: Coláiste na nGael, French: Collège des Irlandais, Latin: Collegium Clericorum Hibernorum) was for three centuries a major Roman Catholic educational establishment for Irish students in Paris, France. It was founded in the late 16th century, and closed down by the French government in the early 20th century. From 1945 to 1997, the Polish seminary in Paris was housed in the building. It is now an Irish cultural centre, the Centre Culturel Irlandais.

== Foundation ==
The religious persecution under Elizabeth and James I led to the suppression of the monastic schools in Ireland in which the clergy for the most part received their education. It became necessary, therefore, to seek education abroad, and many colleges for the training of the secular clergy were founded on the continent, at Rome, in Spain and Portugal, in Belgium, and in France.

The founder of the Irish College in Paris was John Lee, an Irish priest who came to Paris, in 1578, with six companions, and entered the Collège de Montaigu. Having completed his studies he became attached to the Church of St. Severin, and made the acquaintance of a French nobleman, John de l'Escalopier, President of the Parlement of Paris, who placed at the disposal of the Irish students in Paris a house in the Rue de Sèvres (fr), which served them as a college. Lee became the first rector in about 1605.

== Seventeenth century ==
Lee was followed by Thomas Dease, who was rector until 1621 when he was appointed Bishop of Meath. By letters patent dated 1623, Louis XIII conferred upon the Irish priests and scholars in Paris the right to receive and possess property. It was during the tenure of Dease's successor, Thomas Messingham, that the Irish college was recognised as a seminary by the University of Paris in 1624. Messingham organized the course of studies with a view of sending forth capable missionaries to work in their native country.

The college founded by Lee was not spacious enough to receive the numerous Irish students who came to Paris. Some of them continued to find a home in the Collège Montaigu, others in the Collège de Boncourt, while some, who were in affluent circumstances, resided in the Collège de Navarre. This situation attracted the attention of Vincent de Paul and others, who sought to provide them with a more suitable residence.

In 1672, the bishops of Ireland, deputed John O'Molony, Roman Catholic Bishop of Killaloe, to treat with Colbert as to the establishment of a new college. This was eventually obtained, through the influence of two Irish priests resident in Paris: Patrick Maginn, formerly first chaplain to Queen Catherine, wife of Charles II of England; and Malachy Kelly, one of the chaplains of Louis XIV. These two ecclesiastics obtained from Louis XIV authorisation to enter possession of the Collège des Lombards, a college of the University of Paris founded for Italian students in 1333. They rebuilt the college, then in ruins, at their own expense, and became its first superiors. The acquisition of the college was confirmed by letters patent dated 1677 and 1681. Some years later, the buildings were extended by John Farely, and all the Irish ecclesiastical students in Paris found a home in the Collège des Lombards.

== Eighteenth century ==
The Irish College in Paris was open to all the counties and provinces in Ireland. In 1738, the college chapel was rebuilt under the direction of the architect Pierre Boscry. The number of students went on increasing until, in 1764, it reached 160. It was therefore found necessary to build a second college. The building was commenced in 1769 in Rue du Cheval Vert, now Rue des Irlandais (fr), and the junior section of the students was transferred to the new college in 1776. The students were divided into two categories, one, the more numerous, consisting of priests already ordained in Ireland, and the other of juniors aspiring to orders. Both sections attended the university classes, either at the Collège de Plessis, or at that of Navarre, or at the Sorbonne. The course of study extended over six years, of which two were given to philosophy, three to theology, and one to special preparation for pastoral work. The more talented students remained two years longer to qualify for degrees in theology, or in canon law.

In virtue of the papal bull of Pope Urban VIII, Piis Christi fidelium, dated 10 July 1626, and granted in favour of all Irish colleges already established or to be established in France, Spain, Flanders, or elsewhere, the junior students were promoted to orders ad titulum missionis in Hiberniâ, even extra tempora, and without dimissorial letters, on the representation of the rector of the college – a privilege withdrawn, as regards dimissorial letters, by Pope Gregory XVI. The students in priestly orders were able to support themselves to a large extent by their Mass stipends. Many burses, too, were founded for the education of students at the Lombard college. Among the founders were nine Irish bishops, thirty-two Irish priests, four medical doctors, some laymen engaged in civil or military pursuits, and a few pious women. The college was governed in the eighteenth century by four Irish priests called provisors, one from each province of Ireland. They were elected by the votes of the students and confirmed by the Archbishop of Paris, who, as superior major, nominated one of them to the office of the principal. In 1788, the system of government by provisors was abolished, and one rector was appointed.

In 1792, following the French Revolution, the two Irish colleges in Paris, namely the Collège des Lombards, and the then junior college, the Collège des Irlandais on the rue du Cheval Vert, were closed, as were all the other Irish colleges in France. The original library collection of the Irish College was entirely lost during the Revolution. The closing of the colleges on the Continent deprived the bishops of Ireland of the means of educating their clergy. They, therefore, petitioned the British Government for authorisation to establish an ecclesiastical college at home. The petition was granted, and Maynooth College was founded in 1795. In support of their petition, the bishops submitted a statement of the number of Irish ecclesiastics receiving education on the Continent when the French Revolution began.

During the seventeenth and eighteenth centuries, forty students of the Irish College in Paris were raised to the episcopal bench. Over the period 1660 to 1730, more than sixty Irishmen held the office of procurator of the German nation —one of the four sections of the faculty of arts in the ancient university. Michael Moore, an Irish priest, held the office of the principal of the Collège de Navarre, and was twice elected rector of the university. Many Irishmen held chairs in the university. John Sleyne was a professor at the Sorbonne. Power was a professor of the college at Lisieux; and O'Lonergan at the college of Reims. John Plunkett, Patrick J. Plunkett, and Flood, superiors or provisors of the Irish college, were in succession royal professors of theology at the Collège de Navarre.

From its closure following the revolution, the Irish College was leased by Patrick MacDermott who ran a lay school there up until 1800; both Napoleon's youngest brother Jérôme and his step-son studied there.

== Nineteenth century ==
After the French Revolution, the Irish college in Paris was re-established by a decree of the first consul, and placed under the control of a board appointed by the French Government, creating the Fondation Irlandaise in 1805. To it was united the remnants of the property of the other Irish colleges in France which had escaped destruction. The college in Paris lost two-thirds of its endowments owing to the depreciation of French state funds, which had been reduced to one-third consolidated. The Scots College (Paris) and English college interests were also consolidated into the Irish College, their foundations were separated in 1824 again by Louis XVIII.

In 1810, Richard Ferris was appointed by the French to administer/superior of the United British (of which the Irish Colleges were part) Colleges.

In 1814, the Irish Bishops, and, following the establishment of Maynooth College, supported by the British government, twenty years earlier, sent Paul Long to the college to exercise its control over the institution, and he was appointed superior. This caused friction with Richard Ferris, who still held sway with many in Paris, and during Napoleon's 100 days in power in 1815, Ferris briefly resumed the post as Rector/Superior.

After the Bourbon Restoration, the French Government placed at the disposal of the British government three million and a half sterling, to indemnify British subjects in France for the losses they had sustained in the Revolution. In 1816, a claim for indemnity was presented on behalf of the Irish college. That claim was rejected by the privy council in 1825 on the grounds that the college was a French establishment. In 1832 the claim was renewed by M'Sweeny, director of the college, with the same result. Another attempt to obtain compensation was made by the rector Thomas McNamara in 1870. On 9 May of that year, a motion was made in the House of Lords for copies of the awards in the case of the Irish college in 1825 and 1832. This step was followed up by a motion in the House of Commons for the appointment of a select committee to inquire into the claims of the college to compensation for losses sustained during the French Revolution. The motion was introduced on 30 April 1875, by Isaac Butt, MP for Limerick, and, after a prolonged discussion, it was defeated by 116 to 54 votes.

After 1805, the administration of the college was subject to a "Bureau de Surveillance" which gave much trouble until it was dissolved by Charles X of France, in 1824. After that date, the superior, appointed on presentation of the four archbishops of Ireland, became the official administrator of the foundations, subject to the minister of the interior, and at a later period to the minister of public instruction. The students no longer frequented the university. The professors were Irish priests appointed by the French Government on the presentation of the Irish episcopate. In 1858, with the sanction of the Sacred Congregation of Propaganda, and with the consent of the French Government, the bishops of Ireland placed the management of the college in the hands of the Irish Vincentian Fathers, with McNamara being succeeded in 1889 by Patrick Boyle.

In 1834, McSweeney purchased a country house at Acuril/Arcueil about an hour's walk from the college, which was used by the students at weekends and public holidays. The property was sold following the Second World War and redeveloped all that remains of the college is in names of palaces, villa des Irlandais and a cité des Irlandais as well as some graves of Irish priests and students in Cachan Cemetery.

In the nineteenth century, the college gave to the Catholic Church a wide array of good priests and bishops, including Fitz Patrick, Abbot of Melleray; Maginn, Coadjutor Bishop of Derry; Keane, of Cloyne; Michael O'Hea and Fitz Gerald of Ross; Gillooly of Elphin, and Croke of Cashel. Kelly, the Bishop of Ross, and McSherry, vicar Apostolic at Port Elizabeth, South Africa, were also alumni of the college. Cardinal Logue held the chair of dogmatic theology from 1866 to 1874.

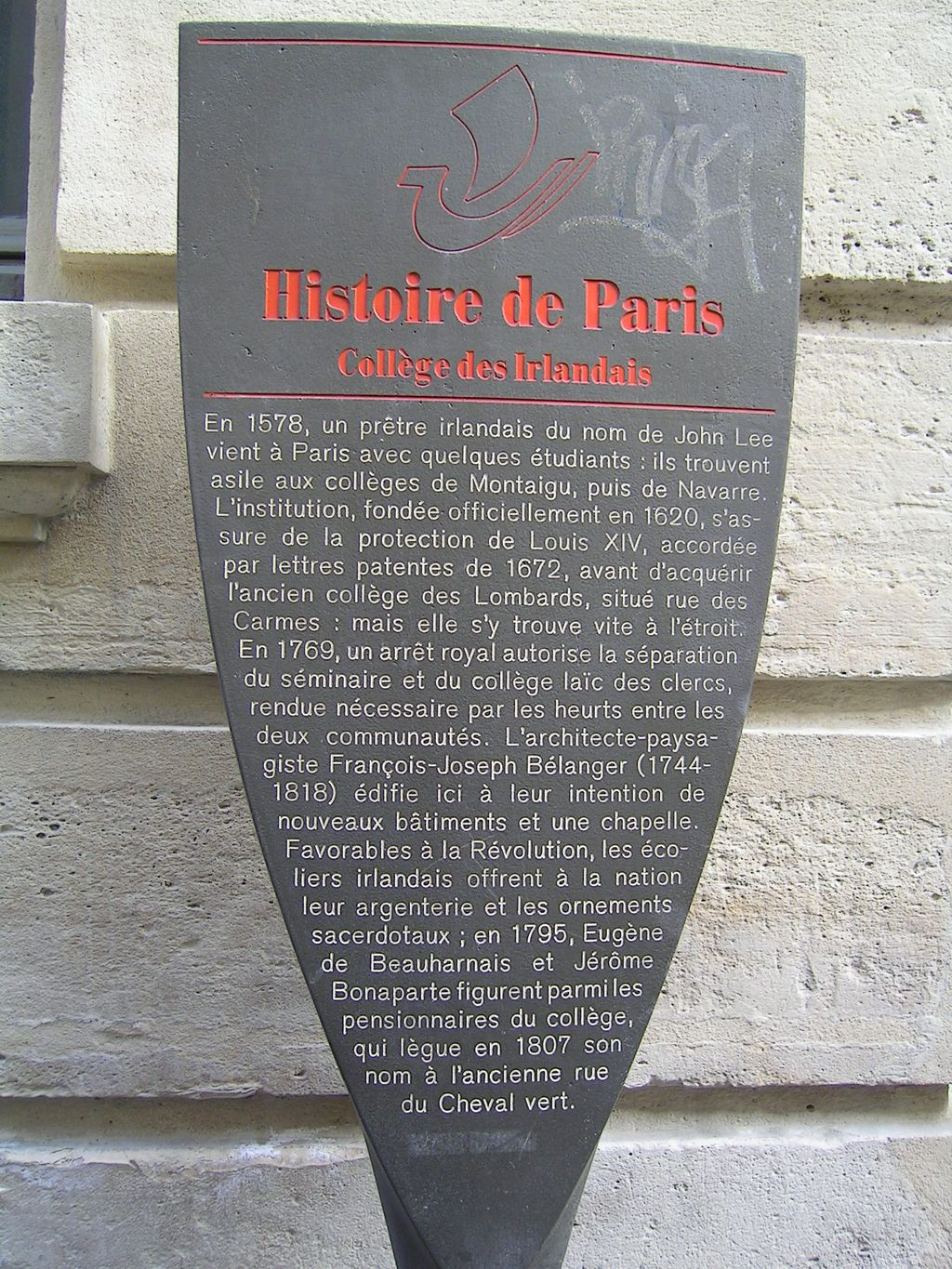
The commemorative plaque

From 1873, the administration of the property of the college was with a board created by a decree of the Conseil d'Etat. On that board, the Archbishop of Paris was represented by a delegate, and he was also the official medium of communication between the Irish episcopate and the French Government.

During the nineteenth and twentieth centuries, burses were available to students from Maynooth College and Clonliffe College, Dublin, to spend time in the Irish College, Paris studying at the Institut Catholique de Paris. This connection continues with recent chaplains to the college, pursuing studies in the Institut.

== Twentieth Century ==
In December 1906, the law of separation of Church and State in France came into operation. In the following January, the French government notified the British government of its intention to reorganise the Irish Catholic foundations in France so as to bring them into harmony with the recent legislation regarding the Church. It was further stated that the purpose of the Government was to close the Irish college, to sell its immovable property, and to invest the proceeds of the sale, to be applied together with the existing burses for the benefit of Irish students. However, due to the exertions of its superior, Patrick Boyle, and the British ambassador in Paris the college remained open until the outbreak of World War I caused its closure.

During the war Boyle opened the college for use by the sisters and orphans from Verdun Orphanage. The college resumed in 1919, but closed again on the outbreak of World War II, with students evacuated, leaving Travers resident for the duration of the war. After the war, it was not reopened as an Irish College, instead, in 1947 the college was made available for use by a Polish religious community. Throughout the 1970s, 1980s and 1990s, Liam Swords and Devlin worked to regain the Irish control and presence in the college. In 1989, an Irish presence was re-established, a number of renovations were made, and scholarships funded Irish students studying in Paris to stay in the college, as Cardinal O'Fiach said in 1989, (he hoped the Irish college) would "one day house an Irish Cultural Centre, with library, language training, student exchanges – in short, a meeting place where Ireland will meet France and through France the wider Europe".

In 1991, the Fondation Irlandaise which officially controlled the college, was reconstituted, from six French and one Irish member, to seven members from each country, nominees to the foundation were from the Archbishop of Paris, Maynooth and The Irish Ambassador to France. The Polish community re-located to Notre-Dame de Sion in Issy-les-Moulineaux, in 1997.

In the editorial for the Irish Arts Review Yearbook 1999, art historian Homan Potterton wrote critically of the college as being an "absolute disaster", noting:

Calling itself an Irish Cultural Centre, the last named - occupying a 17th century courtyard building that is almost as magnificent as Les Invalides and situated grandly in the Rue des Irlandais (fr) near the Sorbonne and the Panthéon - has enormous advantages but no sense of vision or direction [..] So what can be done about the Irish College? It is technically owned by Maynooth and as the priestly population has declined the College has developed other uses. Bedrooms have been refurbished to provide a congenial and economic haven in Paris and there is a half-hearted - and confused - programme of cultural activities which most people - and certainly the Parisians - could well do without. An exhibition gallery is planned. But the College is such a glorious place that it is a tragedy for its cultural role to be so dismal. Someone - the Cultural Relations Committee of the Department of Foreign Affairs, the Arts Council, the Ireland Fund - ought to take the lead.

=== 400th Celebrations ===
In 1978, the Irish College celebrated its fourth centenary, events were held such as a reception hosted by the Irish Ambassador, mass at St. Etienne du Mont (at which Frank Patterson sang), seminar and social events in the college, many dignitaries such as Cardinal O'Fiach, Sean McBride, the Irish in France and those connected with the college in attendance, as well as academics from Irish universities and international institutions who attended the seminar.

== Alumni and rectors ==
In the three hundred years of its existence, the college has not been without a share in the ecclesiastical literature of Ireland. Among the rectors of the college have been Thomas Messingham, prothonotary Apostolic, author of the "Florilegium Insulæ Sanctorum" (Paris, 1624); Andrew Donlevy, author of an "Anglo-Irish Catechism" (Paris, 1742); Miley, author of "A History of the Papal States" (Dublin, 1852); Thomas McNamara, author of "Programmes of Sermons" (Dublin, 1880), "Encheiridion Clericorum" (1882), and several other similar works.

James MacGeoghegan, Sylvester O'Hallaran, Martin Haverty, and probably Geoffrey Keating, all eminent Irish historians, were students of the college. Dean Kinane, a student and then a professor in the college, is widely known for his "Dove of the Tabernacle" and numerous other devotional works.

More recently, John MacGuinness, vice-rector, has published a full course of dogmatic theology. Amongst the rectors of the college were John Farley and John Baptist Walsh, in the eighteenth century, and Patrick MacSweeney and Thomas MacNamara, in the nineteenth. Charles Ouin La Croix, from Rouen, administered the college from 1859 until 1873. Charles O'Neill was college president in the 18th century.

=== Alumni ===
- Eugène de Beauharnais – Duke of Leuchtenberg and stepson of Napoleon Bonaparte, attended the lay college established following the revolution
- Jérôme Bonaparte – youngest brother of Napoleon attended the lay college
- Henry Conwell – Bishop of Philadelphia
- William Coppinger – Bishop of Cloyne and Ross
- Thomas Croke – Archbishop of Cashel
- Daniel Delany – Bishop of Kildare and Leighlin
- James Dillon – Bishop of Kilmore
- Patrick Donnelly - Bishop of Dromore, known as The Bard of Armagh
- Peter Flood – second President of St. Patrick's College, Maynooth.
- James Gallagher – Bishop of Raphoe(1725–37),Bishop of Kildare and Leighlin(1737–51)
- Laurence Gillooly – Bishop of Elphin
- Neal McCabe – Bishop of Ardagh and Clonmacnoise, served as Rector 1866–68, buried in the Vincentian community plot in Montparnasse, Paris.
- John McCarthy, Bishop Sandhurst, Australia, 1917–1950
- Michael O'Reilly, Bishop of Derry(1739–49) and Archbishop of Armagh(1749–58)
- Patrick Joseph Plunkett – Bishop of Meath, served as superior and professor in Paris
- Charles Tuohy – Bishop of Limerick 1813–28

=== Burials in the College ===
- Andrew Donlevy, alumni of the Irish College (housed in the Collège des Lombards) buried in the vaults of the college chapel
- Dominic Maguire OP, Jacobite, Archbishop of Armagh
- John O'Molony, Bishop of Killaloe and Bishop of Limerick

=== Rectors & Superiors ===
- John Lee (1605–)
- Thomas Dease ( -1621), appointed Bishop of Meath
- Thomas Messingham (1621–1632), rector when the college was officially linked to the University of Paris in 1626.
- James Merrick, Superior
- John Farley (1728–1736), principal
- Patrick Corr (1736–1738), principal
- Patrick Joseph Plunkett (1770–1778) joint Superior of the Irish College(College of the Lombards), and royal professor of theology, Collège de Navarre.
- Charles Kearney (1782–1787), superior/rector, remained in Paris
- John Baptist Walsh (1787–1814), superior, responsible for the Fondation Irlandais/Irish College inheriting and acquiring the legacy and equity of the Irish and British Colleges in France.
- Richard Ferris(1810–1814, 1815), "colourful" and controversial superior and administrator of the British(which included the Irish) Colleges.
- Paul Long (1814–1819), administrator, sent by Maynooth to assert Irish control of the college and its interests.
- Charles Kearney (1820–1824), reappointed rector, he died in 1824 and was interred in the college vaults.
- Paul McSweeney (1828–1849)
- John Miley (1849–1858)
- James Lynch (1858-1866), first Vincentian rector
- Neal McCabe (1866–1868)
- Thomas McNamara (1868–1889)
- Patrick Boyle (1889–1926), re-established the college following its closure during World War I, he remained and taught in the college until his death in 1933.
- John Magennis (McGuinness) (1926–1932)
- Joseph P. Sheedy (1932–1938)
- Patrick Travers (1938–39) stayed at the college during the Second World War. Reappointed and served from (1949–1972)
- Henry Casey (1945–1949)
- Patrick Travers, Reappointed (1949–1972), non-resident, with William McGlynn resident priest, liaising with the French Government.
- Thomas Fagan (1972–1984), non-resident in the college, in 1984 the Vincentians relinquished their position as rectors of the college.
- Brendan Devlin (1984–2001), rector and manager

Following the reappointment of Travers, the rector was not resident in the college, and only visited periodically to look after the Irish interest in the college which was being used for seminary training Polish priests, Seminaire Polonais de Paris(1947–97). An Irish Catholic presence was re-established in the 1970s when the historian and archivist Liam Swords became chaplain to the Irish Community in Paris.

== Chaplains (or Aumônier, Collège des Irlandais) ==
- Liam Swords (1978–1994), first priest in residence since 1945
- Desmond Knowles (1994–1998)
- Pearce Walsh (1998–2002)
- Desmond Knowles (2002–2003)
- Declan Hurley (2003–2008)
- David Bracken (2008–2011)
- Sean Maher (2011–2014)
- Dwayne Gavin (2014–2017)
- Hugh Connolly (2017–2022), who served as board member and secretary of the Fondation Irlandais, when in Maynooth.
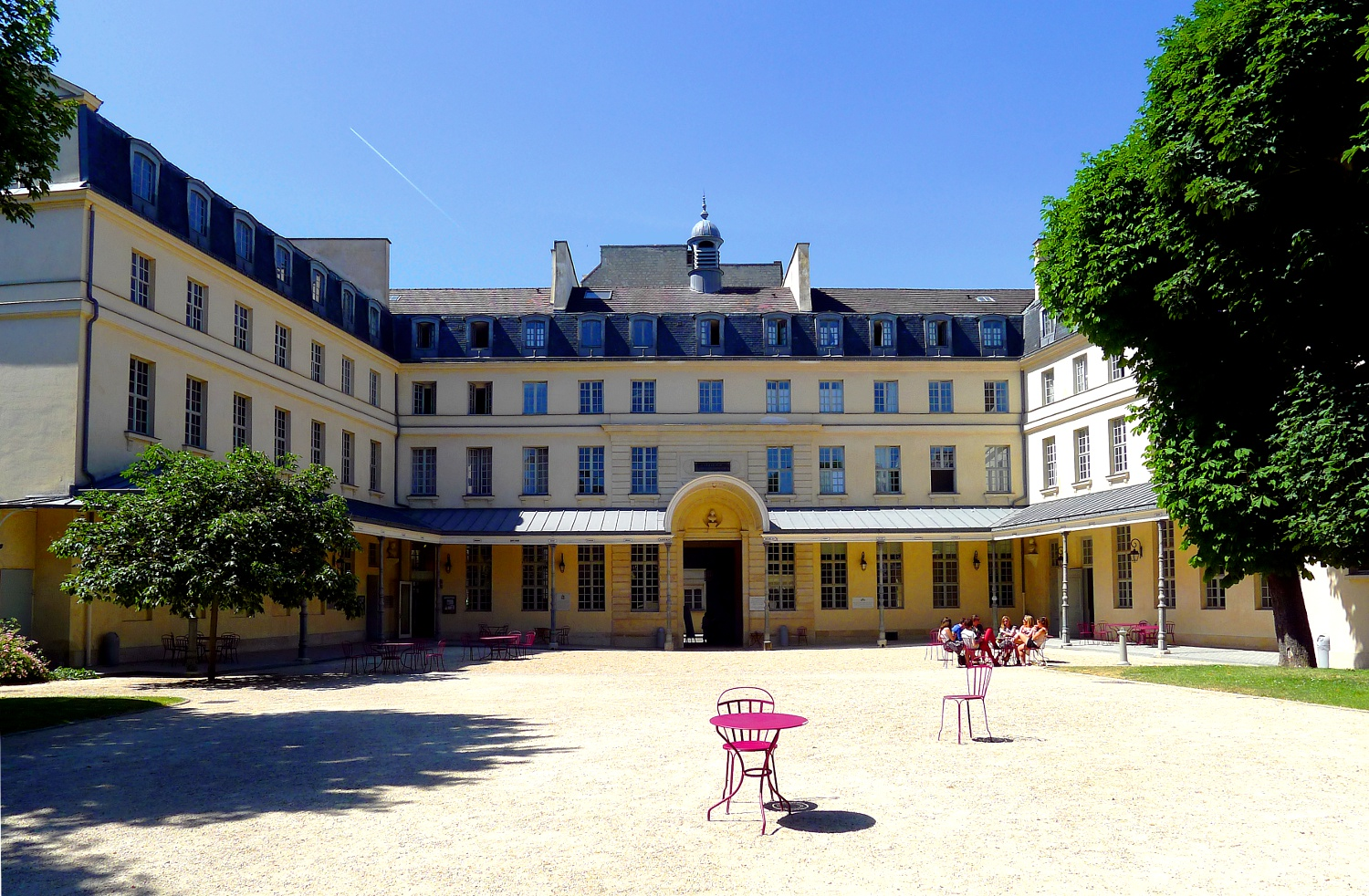
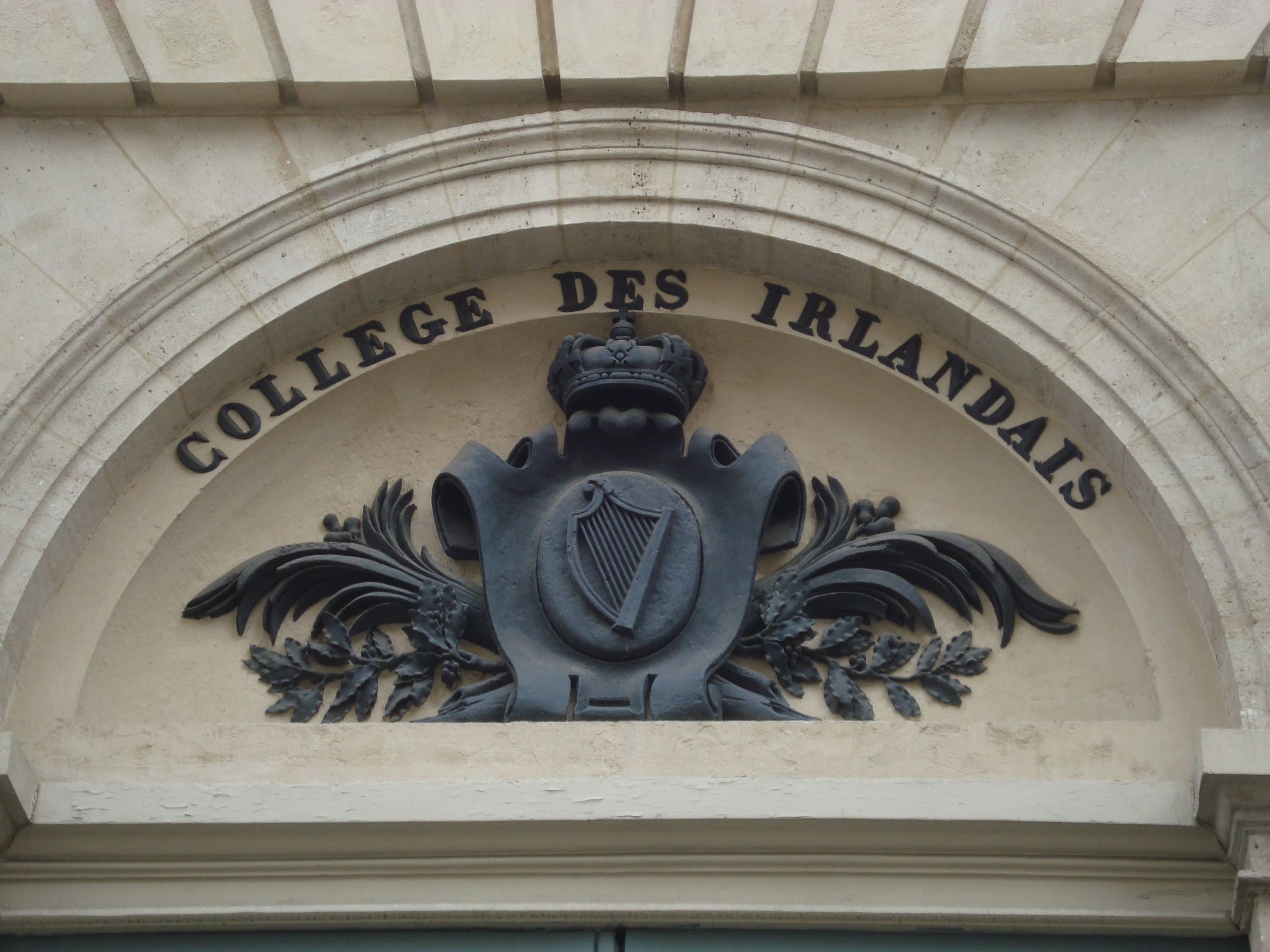
Centre Culturel Irlandais
- Jim Doyle (2022–)

== Today ==
The Polish community having re-located in 1997, the college, including the chapel and library underwent a complete restoration funded by the Irish government, and in 2002 it opened as the Centre Culturel Irlandais. The center appoints an artist in residence, and a number of scholars and students from Ireland stay at the college, which has 45 rooms to rent. The CCI hosts various concerts, performances, seminars, and exhibitions, and Irish Language classes are conducted in association with Maynooth University. The Irish Chaplaincy in Paris is based in the centre and uses the college's Chapelle Saint-Patrick for services, such as weekly mass (followed by coffee and a chat), weddings, baptisms and the annual carol service in the chapel by the choir for the Irish community in Paris. The harmonium was restored funded by the Ireland Funds France. The Irish Chaplain assists in the local Saint Etienne du Mont parish and the chaplaincy also works closely with the other church in Paris which holds English language services, St. Joseph's Church run by the Passionists (currently served by two Irish born priests). The only part of the older College des Lombards remaining, is the chapel, which since 1927 used by the Saint-Éphrem-le-Syriac Church, the Irish Chaplain holds an annual service there for those Irish who are buried older college site. Also at the recently restored Irish College plot in Cachan Cemetery, Arcueil-Cachan, Paris.

== See also ==
- Irish College in Bordeaux (1603–1794) – merged into Fondation Irlandais
- Irish College, Douai (1603–1793)
- Irish College in Toulouse (1618–1793) – merged into Fondation Irlandais
- Irish College at Lisbon
- Irish College in Rome
- Irish College at Salamanca (1592–1952)
- Irish Dominican St Anthony's College, Leuven (1607–1983), Accommodation, and Cultural Centre

== Sources ==
- Irish in Europe archives
