= James O'Connor (bishop) =

Irish-born American Catholic prelate (1823–1890)

The Most Reverend James O'Connor
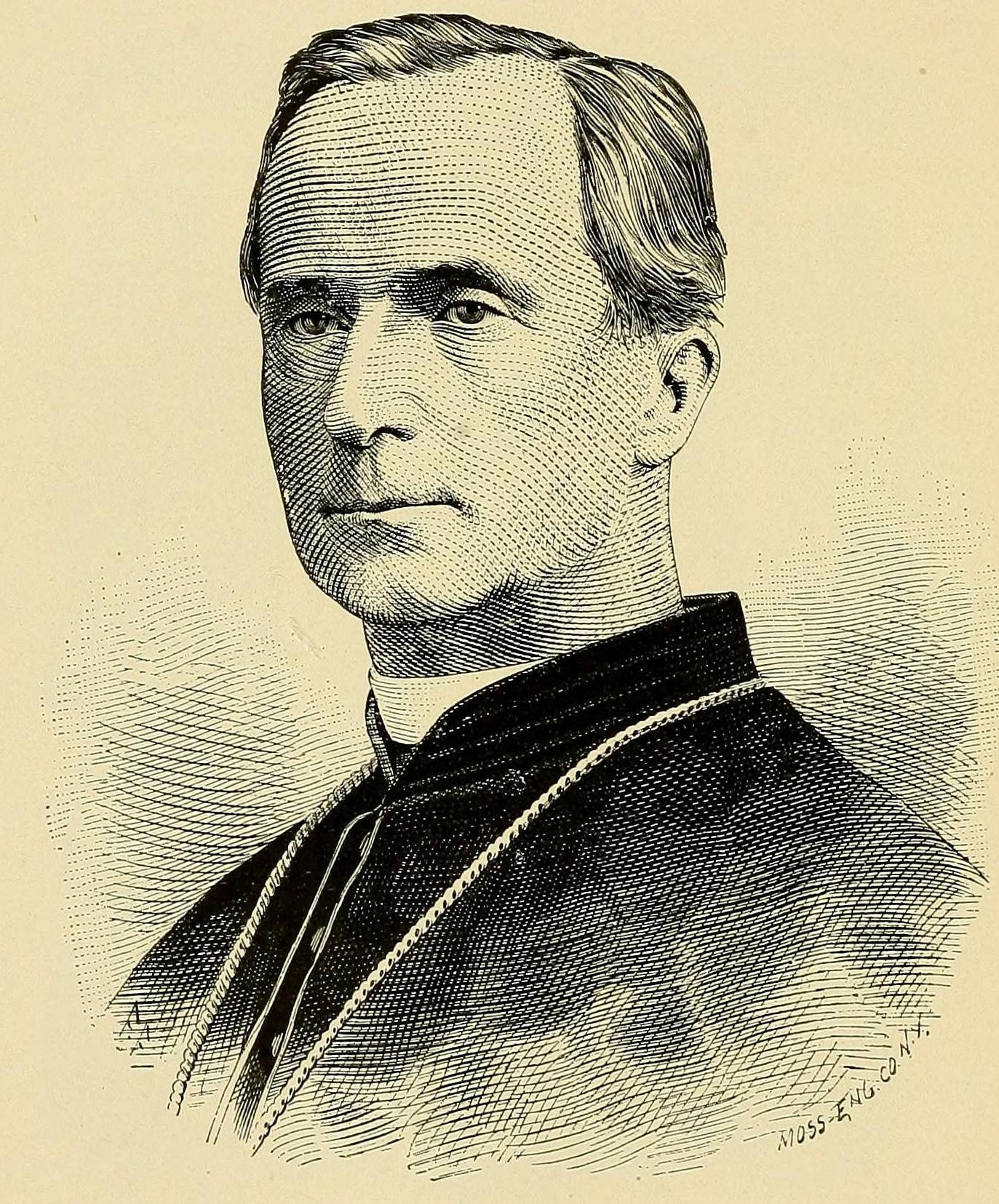
- Church: Catholic
- Diocese: Omaha
- Appointed: October 2, 1885
- Term ended: May 27, 1890
- Predecessor: James Myles O'Gorman
- Successor: Richard Scannell
- Previous posts: Vicar Apostolic of Nebraska (1876‍–‍1885); Titular Bishop of Dibon (1876‍–‍1885); Pastor of St. Dominic's (1872‍–‍1876); Priest (1845‍–‍1862)

Orders
- Ordination: March 25, 1848 by Giacomo Filippo Fransoni
- Consecration: August 20, 1876 by Patrick John Ryan

Personal details
- Born: September 10, 1823 Queenstown, Ireland
- Died: May 27, 1890 (aged 66) Omaha, Nebraska, US
- Education: Pontifical Irish College

James O'Connor (September 10, 1823 – May 27, 1890) was an Irish-born American prelate of the Catholic Church in the United States. He was the first bishop of the Diocese of Omaha in Nebraska.

== Biography ==
James O'Connor was born in Queenstown, Ireland, September 10, 1823. In 1834, his older brother Michael, former Vice-Rector of the Pontifical Irish College in Rome, was serving as chaplain at for the convent of the Presentation Sisters in Doneraile. Peter Richard Kenrick, brother of Francis Kenrick, coadjutor bishop of Philadelphia, persuaded Father Michael to come to Philadelphia and teach at St. Charles Borromeo Seminary.

James accompanied his brother to Philadelphia and took up studies at the seminary. From there he completed his studies at the Pontificio Collegio Urbano de Propaganda Fide in Rome, where he was ordained a priest in 1845. In the meantime, his brother had been appointed Bishop of Pittsburgh. James therefore took up missionary work in the Diocese of Pittsburgh. His administrative skills led him to be appointed in 1857 president of the diocesan seminary of St. Michael.

This led in 1862 to Archbishop Wood naming him rector of St. Charles Borromeo. In 1872, he became pastor of St. Dominic's in Holmesburg, Philadelphia and served as chaplain to the nearby Society of the Sacred Heart at their motherhouse at Eden Hall in Torresdale.

In 1876, he succeeded James Myles O'Gorman as vicar apostolic of Nebraska, an area that covered Nebraska, northeastern Colorado, Wyoming, and parts of Utah, Montana and the Dakotas. He was consecrated titular bishop of Dibon at the chapel at Eden Hall by Patrick John Ryan, Coadjutor Archbishop of St. Louis, assisted by Jeremiah F. Shanahan, Bishop of Harrisburg, Pennsylvania, and William O'Hara of Bishop of Scranton. The construction of the Union Pacific Railway in 1867, and more especially the extension of the Burlington Railway in the seventies and eighties, opened up Nebraska to settlers from the East. It became the duty of the new vicar to provide for the growing needs of the faithful, and the yearly statistics of the vicariate show how successful were his labours. In 1880 the Dakotas were erected into a vicariate, and in April, 1887, Montana was split off.

In 1885, the Diocese of Omaha was created, and O'Connor was appointed its first bishop. The new diocese embraced the present states of Nebraska and Wyoming. In August 1887, the Dioceses of Cheyenne and Lincoln were erected. During his administration, many of Omaha's older parishes were founded. O'Connor also introduced into his jurisdiction the Franciscans, the Poor Clares, the Religious of the Sacred Heart, the Benedictines, and the Sisters of Providence. A most important work in the bishop's life was the foundation, in conjunction with Miss Katharine Drexel, of the Sisters of the Blessed Sacrament, in 1889 (In 2000, Drexel became a saint in the Catholic Church.). Through the generosity of the Creighton family, Bishop O'Connor was enabled to erect Creighton College. On its completion in 1879, the bishop, who held the property in trust, deeded over the institution to the Jesuits, who are since in charge and hold the property as trustees. Bishop O'Connor also helped to establish the Catholic Mutual Relief Society of America.

O'Connor died shortly before noon on May 27, 1890, at the age of sixty-seven, after having been in failing health for about a year.

Catholic Church titles
Preceded by James Myles O'Gorman	Bishop of Omaha; 1885–1890	Succeeded by Richard Scannell
