= Cecil McGarry =

Irish prist and educator (1929–2009)

Cecil McGarry S.J. (1 January1929-24 November 2009) was an Irish Jesuit priest, theologian, and educator. He served as Provincial of the order in Ireland from 1968, and later as rector of the Jesuit Milltown Park in Dublin, where he oversaw the development of the Jesuit School of Theology into the Milltown Institute of Theology and Philosophy. McGarry supported the establishment of the Irish School of Ecumenicism in 1970. He joined the Jesuits in 1946 first at Emo Court, then Milltown Park.

After his leadership roles in Ireland, he spent more than two decades in East Africa, working in Kenya as part of the East African Province of the Jesuits. He died in Nairobi in 2009 and was buried at the Jesuit Mwangaza retreat centre.

In 1964 he received a doctorate in theology from Pontifical Gregorian University in Rome, Italy, he took his final vows in Italy in 1964. He returned to Ireland and taught at the Jesuit School of Theology, Milltown Park, before being appointed it Rector. In 1968 he was appointed Provincial of the order.

Under his leadership, the Jesuit School of Theology became the Milltown Institute of Theology and Philosophy in 1968.

As Provincial he supported the establishment of the Irish School of Ecumenics in Milltown in 1970 and its founder Michael Hurley S.J. through his disputes with the hierarchy.

Following his service in Ireland he served in Africa (where he served for 25 years), in Kenya and joined the East African Province of the Jesuits.

He died on November 24, 2009, and his funeral was held in St. John Evangelist Church, Nairobi, Kenya, and he is buried in the Jesuit cemetery in Mwangaza retreat centre.
