= Michael Hurley (Jesuit) =

Michael Hurley SJ (10 May 1923 – 15 April 2011) was an Irish Jesuit priest and theologian, who has been widely called the "father of Irish ecumenism" for promoting Christian unity. Hurley co-founded the Irish School of Ecumenics in 1970 and served as the school's director until 1980.

== Biography ==
Hurley was born in Ardmore, County Waterford, on 10 May 1923. He attended school in Mount Melleray Abbey, before joining the Society of Jesus in 1940. Hurley was ordained a priest in 1954. Hurley was educated at both University College Dublin and the Catholic University of Leuven. He received a doctorate in theology from Pontifical Gregorian University in Rome, Italy. Hurley taught at the former Mungret College from 1958 to 1970.

A strong proponent of ecumenism, Hurley co-founded the Irish School of Ecumenics in 1970. Hurley worked to good relations between different Christian denominations in Ireland, Northern Ireland and abroad. His work at the school was opposed by Archbishop John Charles McQuaid, the then conservative Archbishop of Dublin. McQuaid initially banned Hurley from speaking on ecumenism within the Roman Catholic Archdiocese of Dublin. However, McQuaid reversed the ban after Hurley was defended by Father Cecil McGarry, the Jesuit provincial in Ireland during the early 1970s.

McQuaid died in 1973. His successor, Archbishop Dermot Ryan, remained opposed to Hurley and the Irish School of Ecumenics. Hurley later said in an interview, "Archbishop Ryan, became somewhat unhappy with [the Irish School of Ecumenics] and with myself in particular, because, although I’m called after the archangel, I’m no angel. I’ve never quite managed to be angelic, much less archangelic, in my behaviour. So towards the end of the school’s first decade, it seemed best to remove myself from the scene. After that, the school’s relationship with the Catholic archdiocese did improve." Hurley stepped down as director of the Irish School of Ecumenics in 1980 and relations with the Archdiocese of Dublin began to improve.

Hurley co-founded the Columbanus Community of Reconciliation, located on Antrim Road in Belfast, in 1983. Hurley had conceived of the idea of a community where Protestants and Catholics could live together during the 1981 Irish hunger strike. He lived at Columbanus for ten years, before moving to the Jesuit community residence in Milltown Park, South Dublin, in 1993, where he lived for the rest of his life.

Hurley received honorary doctorates from Queen's University Belfast in 1993 and Trinity College, Dublin, in 1995. In 2008, David F. Ford, a former theologian at the University of Cambridge wrote that Hurley "was ahead of his time in how he brought ecumenism among churches together with interfaith dialogue and dedication to religious, political and cultural reconciliation across some of the deepest differences in our world. Hurley’s daring alliance of faith with intellect and institutional creativity has challenged the religious and the non-religious to take seriously the role of religion in healing the contemporary world."

In 2008, Archbishop Diarmuid Martin apologised to Hurley for his treatment by the late Archbishop John Charles McQuaid during the establishment of the Irish School of Ecumenics in the 1960s and 1970s. Hurley called it a "magnanimous apology".

Hurley died in Dublin on 15 April 2011, at the age of 87.
