= Peter Flood =

Irish priest, President of Maynooth College 1798-1803

Peter Flood was an Irish priest and educator. A native of Legan, County Longford, Flood received his seminary education in Paris, gaining an MA (1774) and LTh (1780). Flood became a professor of theology, first, at the College de Navarre and later at the college des Lombards, where the Irish College in Paris was based at.

Flood was in Paris during the September Massacres of 1792 and narrowly escaped death; he returned home and became parish priest of Edgeworthstown, County Longford. He served as president of St. Patrick's College, Maynooth from 1798 to 1803, where he worked on the development of the college during its formative years and the upheaval of the 1798 Rebellion.
