= Burren, County Down =

Village in County Down, Northern Ireland

Coordinates: 54.132°N 6.264°W

Burren: Irish: an Bhoirinn; Burren
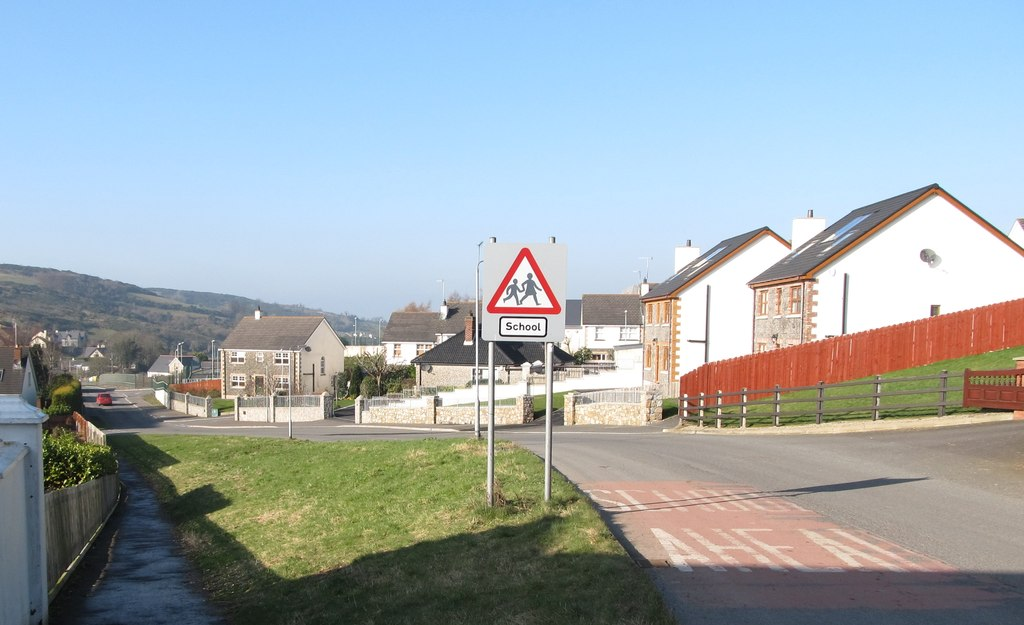
- Ballydesland Road, Burren

- Location within County Down
- District: Newry and Mourne
- County: County Down
- Country: Northern Ireland
- Sovereign state: United Kingdom
- Postcode district: BT34
- Dialling code: 028 417
- UK Parliament: South Down
- NI Assembly: South Down

Burren (from Irish an Bhoirinn, meaning 'the rocky district') is a small village in County Down, Northern Ireland. It is near Warrenpoint. It is not to be confused with the Burren area in County Clare.

== Places of interest ==
Burren Heritage Centre is a converted national school at the foot of the Mourne Mountains, telling the story of the area.

In the year 1927, Tamnaharry Park became a convent when the (Irish) Dominican Sisters of South Africa purchased the property. The new Convent Chapel of Our Lady of the Assumption was dedicated, and its high altar consecrated, by Bishop Mulhern on 24 May 1939. Dr P. Clery, O.P., Dean of Dublin, preached the dedication sermon. By 1945, the Sisters had acquired a new novitiate in County Kildare and were succeeded in Tamnaharry by the Sisters of St Joseph of the Apparition. The house remained in religious hands until 1969, when the Morton Family of Banbridge bought it.

== Notable people ==
- James Larkin, trade union organiser and socialist activist was once resident here.
- Frank Mitchell, UTV Live and U105 presenter.
- P. J. Bradley, South Down MLA.
- Paddy O'Rourke, inter-county football manager.
- Kevin McKernan
- Daniel McCartan
- Hugh Connolly, Priest and academic.

== Education and sport ==
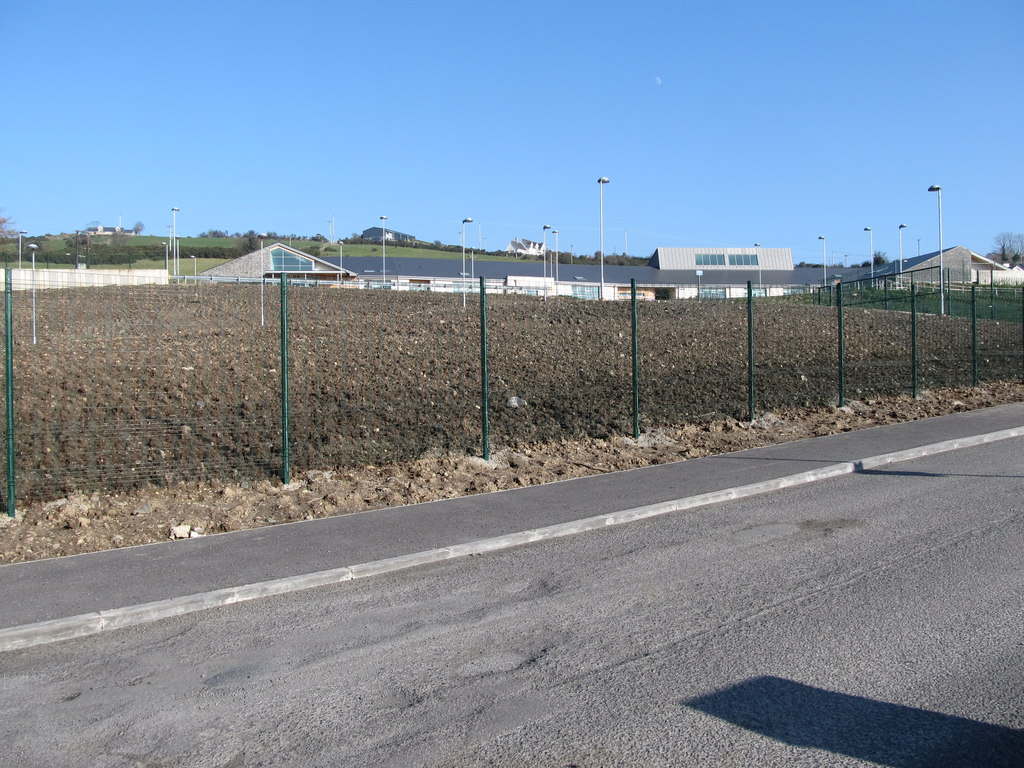
Carric Primary School

Carrick Primary School and two pre-schools are located in the village, Carrick has 417 pupils while nearby Clontifleece Primary School (a rural school) closed in 2013 with 34 children enrolled.

Gaelic football is a popular sport in Burren and the local team, St. Mary's Burren GAA, enjoyed considerable success at national level during the 1980s winning the All-Ireland club football title on two occasions — 1986 and 1988 as well as winning five Ulster club titles and 2 Ulster Under-21. They enjoyed good runs in Ulster in 2010 and 2011, reaching the final in 2011 losing to a strong Crossmaglen team.
