= Thomas Fagan (priest) =

Irish priest and academic administrator

Thomas Fagan CM (1912–2001), was an Irish Vincentian priest, who served as President of All Hallows College, Dublin from 1961 until 1970, he also served as titular rector of the Irish College in Paris in the 1970s.

Born in Oldcastle, Co. Meath, Fagan was educated at the Vincentian Castleknock College, in Dublin, where he was part of the Rugby Leinster Cup-winning team. He proceeded to train as a priest of the order in Dublin. Following ordination in the Pro-Cathedral, Dublin, he was appointed in 1937 to the Irish College in Paris, to teach philosophy, which was administered by the Vincentians, where he was appointed dean in 1938. He also studied philosophy at the Institut Catholique de Paris. Following the outbreak of war he returned to Dublin, and to All Hallows, where he was to work from 1939 until 1970, serving as Dean, Bursar and vice-president, before serving as president.

In 1970 he was appointed to St. Peter's in Phibsboro, as superior and later parish priest, and was attached to the parish for the rest of his life, with a short break as a priest in Cabra.

In 1972 he was appointed Rector of the Irish College in Paris, succeeding Dr. Patrick Travers CM and also the liaison with the French Government for the administration of the college succeeding Fr. William McGlynn. Since the college was now a seminary for Polish priests, the role was administrative, he was a non-resident titular superior. In 1978, under his rectorship, the Irish College celebrated its fourth centenary, with many connected with the college in attendance, as well as academics from Irish universities, the recently appointed chaplain Fr. Liam Swords, and Fagan's eventual successor as Rector Fr Devlin, who were involved in the events, over the years moved to reestablish the Irish presence at the College and move it to be of utility for more Cultural events.

He died on 2 October 2001, his funeral was held in St. Peters Phibsoro, and is buried in All Hallows College Cemetery.

The Fr. Thomas Fagan C.M. Medal for Academic Excellence was awarded to students in All Hallows.

Academic offices
Preceded by Rev. William Purcell CM	President of All Hallows College, Dublin; 1961-1970	Succeeded by Mgr. Thomas Lane CM
Preceded by Rev. Patrick Travers CM	Rector of Irish College in Paris; 1972-1984	Succeeded by Rev. Dr. Brendan Devlin
