= James Myles O'Gorman =

Irish-born prelate of the Catholic Church in the U.S. (1804–1874)

Most Reverend James M. O'Gorman O.C.S.O.
- Vicar Apostolic of Nebraska
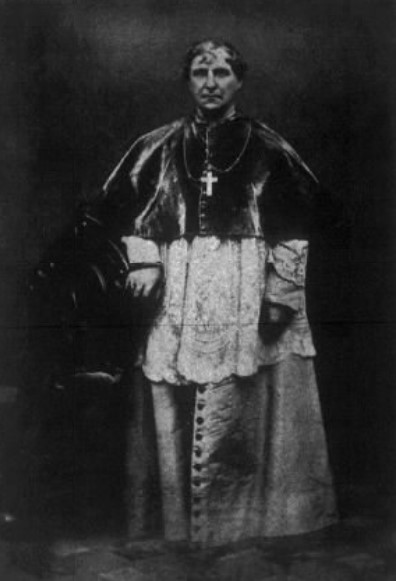
- Church: Catholic Church
- Diocese: Vicariate Apostolic of Nebraska
- See: Titular See of Raphanea
- Appointed: January 28, 1859
- Installed: May 8, 1859
- Term ended: July 4, 1874

Orders
- Ordination: December 23, 1843 by Nicholas Foran
- Consecration: May 8, 1859 by Peter Richard Kenrick

Personal details
- Born: James Michael Myles O'Gorman; October 4, 1804 Cranna, County Tipperary, Ireland
- Died: July 4, 1874 (aged 69) Omaha, Nebraska, U.S.

James Myles O'Gorman, O.C.S.O. (October 4, 1804 – July 4, 1874) was an Irish-born bishop of the Catholic Church in the United States. He served as the Vicar Apostolic of the Nebraska Territory (now known as the Archdiocese of Omaha) from 1859 to 1874.

== Biography ==
Born in the village of Cranna in County Tipperary, Ireland, O'Gorman professed solemn vows as a Trappist at Mount Melleray Abbey on March 25, 1841, and was ordained a priest on December 23, 1843. He emigrated to the United States and became a monk at New Melleray Monastery near Dubuque, Iowa where he became its second Prior. On January 28, 1859 Pope Pius IX appointed him as the Titular Bishop of Raphanea and Bishop of Omaha. He was consecrated a bishop by Archbishop Peter Richard Kenrick of St. Louis on May 8, 1859. The principal co-consecrators were Bishops John Baptiste Miège, S.J., the Vicar Apostolic of Kansas, and Henry Juncker of Alton. When the Vicariate was established in 1859 it covered 357,000 square miles (920,000 km^{2}) and emcopassed what are now the states of Nebraska, Wyoming, Montana, North Dakota, South Dakota, as well as northeastern Colorado, and parts of Utah. When O'Gorman arrived he had three priests to assist him and ordained another priest that year. By the time he died there were 19 priests that served 12,000 Catholics in 20 parishes and 56 missions. O'Gorman participated in the First Vatican Council (1869-1870) as one of the council fathers. He died on July 4, 1874, at the age of 69.

Catholic Church titles
Preceded by Office established	Bishop of Omaha; 1885–1890	Succeeded by James O'Connor
