= Andrew Donlevy =

Irish Catholic priest and educator

Andrew Donlevy (born c.1694) was an Irish Catholic priest and educator.

== Life ==
Little is known about his early life. He was probably born in County Sligo and went abroad to study for the priesthood, reaching Paris in 1710 and becoming a student at the Irish College (housed in the Collège des Lombards) and studied at the University of Paris. His clerical course finished, he was ordained priest, and in 1728, he was appointed prefect in the college, an office he held till 1746.

He had also attended lectures at the university, graduating both in theology and law. While holding the office of prefect, he drew up a new code of rules for the government of the college, placing it under the control of the Archbishop of Paris and subject to the University of Paris.

He is buried in the vaults of the Irish College chapel.

== Works ==
He published in 1742 an Irish-English catechism of the Christian Doctrine, an edition of which appeared in Dublin in 1848.
