= Michael Olden =

Irish priest, historian and educator

Monsignor Michael G. Olden BA, BD, DHistEccl. (1935 - 2021) was an Irish priest, historian and educator who served as President of Maynooth College from 1977 to 1985 and hosted the visit of Pope John Paul II to the college in 1979.

== Early life and education ==
He was born in Cappoquin in 1935 in the Roman Catholic Diocese of Waterford and Lismore and educated at Mount Melleray Abbey College, University College Cork and Maynooth where he was ordained in June 1960. He undertook postgraduate studies at the Gregorian University in Rome in ecclesiastical history and in Oct 1966 was appointed to the staff of St. Patrick's College, Maynooth.

He served as vice-president from 1976 to 1977 and then when Tomas O'Fiach was made Archbishop of Armagh, Michael Olden assumed the duties of president until 1985.

In that time he served as Pro-Vice-Chancellor of the National University of Ireland. During his tenure as president of Maynooth he oversaw the fundraising and planning for the building of the new library.

As a historian, Dr. Olden contributed to many academic publications such as Archivium Hibernicum.

In 2005 it was reported that he was among the college staff interviewed by Denis McCullough SC in his report into the handling of claims against Micheál Ledwith.

== Post-Maynooth Ministry ==
Monsignor Olden returned to the Diocese of Waterford and Lismore to serve in parish ministry, first as PP of Clonmel and then as Parish Priest of Tramore. He also served as Vicar General under Bishop William Lee. He was often in demand as a homilist at important diocesan liturgies. Mgr Olden delivered the homily at the Ordination Mass of Father Alphonsus Cullinan as Bishop of Waterford & Lismore.

In 2008 he contributed a chapter ‘Tobias Kirby (1804‐1895): the man who kept the papers’ to The Irish College Rome and its World edited by D. Keogh & A. McDonnell.

He retired from full-time ministry in 2009.

Maintaining his interest in History and Irish Church History in particular, Mgr. Olden presented a talk on Canon Patrick Power at a seminar in WIT, in March 2012.

In 2013 he delivered a lecture to the Waterford Archaeological and Historical Society entitled Prominent Churchmen From Waterford and Lismore in the 19th century.

He died on 30 August 2021 in Dungarvan and was buried from Mount Melleray Abbey Church.

== Publications ==
- The Parish of Tramore and Carbally by Michael Olden and Andy Taylor.
- Episcipal comments on the "Decreta pro recta regimine ecclesiarum hiberniae", 1635-6, by Michael Olden, Archivium Hibernicum 27 (1964) 1-12.
- The Faith Journey of the Déise People (Waterford, 2018).
