= Hugh Connolly (priest) =

Irish priest, President of Maynooth College 2007-2017

- Born: September 1961 (age 64); Burren, County Down
- Education: Abbey Christian Brothers' Grammar School, St Patrick's College, Maynooth, Pontifical Gregorian University, Rome
- Occupations: Priest, academic, university president, registrar
- Religion: Roman Catholic

Hugh Gerard Connolly (born 1961) is an Irish Catholic priest. He is a parish priest in the troubled Roman Catholic Diocese of Dromore and a former Aumônier des Irlandais at the Collège des Irlandais in Paris. He previously served as president of St Patrick's College, Maynooth, Ireland.

== Early life ==
Born in September 1961, Connolly is a native of Burren near Warrenpoint, County Down, and is a priest of the Diocese of Dromore. He has one sister Rosemary and grew up in a farming community.

== Ministry ==
Connolly attended the Abbey Grammar in Newry before commencing his studies for the priesthood in Maynooth, gaining a BA Honours (NUI) degree in French before studying a theology degree at Maynooth. He was ordained in Maynooth in May 1987. He completed postgraduate doctoral studies in moral theology at the Pontifical Gregorian University, Rome, in 1991.

Connolly worked as a lecturer in moral theology in Maynooth, becoming a professor in 2007. He has also lectured at St. Patrick's, Carlow College.

He was executive secretary of the Irish Catholic Bishops' Conference from 1991 to 1997. He published a book called The Irish Penitentials in 1995 and in 2002 published the volume Sin in the "New Century Theology" series.

He served as registrar (2001–2006).

== President of Maynooth College ==
On 10 August 2007, the trustees of St Patrick's College, Maynooth, announced his appointment as president in succession to Dermot Farrell.

In March 2011, Connolly denied rumours that Maynooth Seminary may be closing. "Media reports today about the possible closure of the seminary are without foundation. The media outlet leading with this incorrect story was sent a reply from us yesterday and its absence from the published copy is disappointing and damaging." A year later, when the Summary of the finding of the Apostolic Visitation in Ireland was published, there was no reference to seminary closures but there were recommendations to improve the quality of seminary formation. In his capacity as rector of the national seminary, Connolly spoke on the dearth of vocations to the diocesan priesthood in Ireland.

He was reappointed for a second term as president on 29 May 2012 at the summer meeting of the college trustees.

In June 2016, it was announced that Connolly was taking a sabbatical year for the final year of his statutory ten-year term as president which concluded on 31 August 2017, nonetheless, it was an announcement that created some reporting that needed clarification. It was noted that the move was in accordance with the new sabbatical provisions of the Pontifical University, adopted some years earlier to reflect standard practice in the third level sector. Several months later advertisements were placed seeking a new college president, to assume office on 1 September 2017.

He was succeeded in the post by Fr Michael Mullaney.

Throughout his time as president, Connolly sought to raise the international profile of the Pontifical University at Maynooth and served as one of two board members for the Continent of Europe on IFCU the umbrella body for rectors of Catholic Universities worldwide.

== Post-Maynooth Ministry ==
In March 2017, Connolly was appointed chaplain-designate at the Irish College Paris (or Aumônier, Collège des Irlandais) effective 1 September 2017. He had previously been a board member of this institution for ten years during its renovation and relaunch as a cultural centre and chaplaincy. Having completed a five-year term in this role he subsequently returned to his Diocese in August 2022 to serve as a parish priest there.

Connolly is the parish priest of the historic parish cluster of Clonallon, which is made up of St. Mary's Burren, St. Peter's Warrenpoint, and St. Patrick's Mayobridge in County Down. In the summer of 2022, as parish priest of St Patrick's, he was nominated trustee of the Dromore Diocesan Trust, and served in this role for approximately three years by which time he had been assigned responsibility for a further two parishes.
