= Mount Melleray Abbey =

Trappist monastery in Ireland

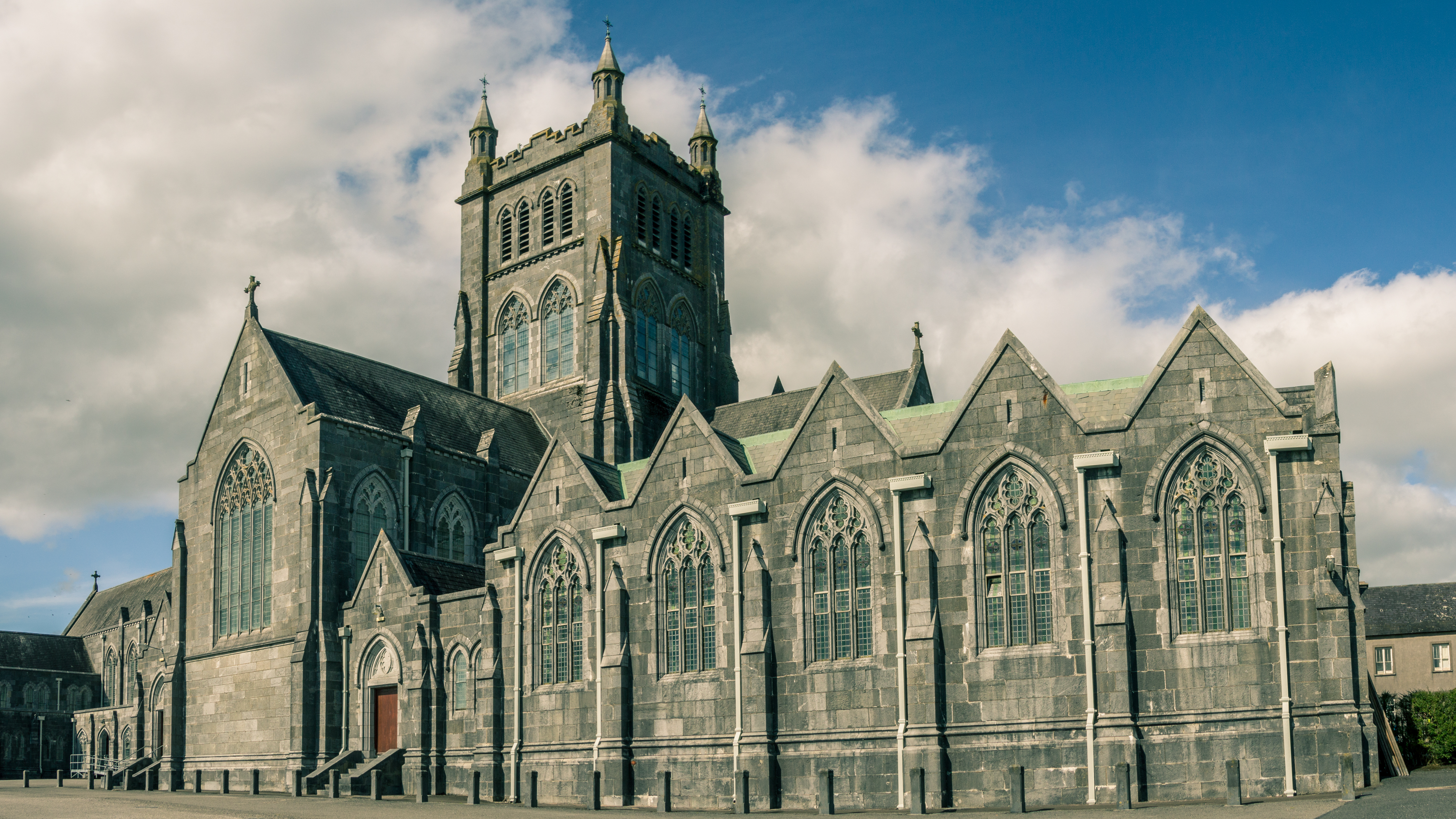

- Location within Ireland

Monastery information
- Order: Trappists
- Established: 1833
- Diocese: Waterford and Lismore

People
- Founder: Sir Richard Keane

Architecture
- Status: Active

Site
- Location: Mount Melleray, near Cappoquin, County Waterford, Ireland
- Coordinates: 52°11′15″N 7°51′27″W
- Public access: Yes

Mount Melleray Abbey (Irish: Mainistir Cnoc Mheilearaí) is a Trappist monastery in Ireland, founded in 1833. It is situated on the slopes of the Knockmealdown Mountains, near Cappoquin, Diocese of Waterford. It closed in 2025. In 2026, Mount Mellerary became a campus for Ave Maria University (AMU), a Florida-based Catholic private university, in partnership with the Cistercian Order.

== History ==
The Cistercian order itself dates back to the 12th century. Following the suppression of monasteries in France after the French Revolution, dispossessed monks had arrived in England in 1794 and established a monastic community in Lulworth, Dorset. Following the Bourbon Restoration, the monks returned to France in 1817 to re-establish the ancient Melleray Abbey in Brittany. Within ten years, the restored monastery had two hundred members, of whom around seventy were Irish. During the July Revolution of 1830, the monks were again persecuted and the French abbot of Melleray sent Waterford-born Vincent Ryan to found an abbey in Ireland.

Ryan initially rented a property in Rathmore, County Kerry. Sixty-four Cisterican monks landed at Cobh from France on 1 December 1831. The land in Rathmore proved unsuitable for housing the monastery and Ryan looked to County Waterford, where Sir Richard Keane, 2nd Baronet of Cappoquin House had offered a tract of 600 acres of barren mountain land.

The monastery was founded on 30 May 1832 at Scrahan, Cappoquin. In the work of reclaiming the soil, the brethren were assisted by the local people, among them the parish of Modeligo.

On the feast of St Bernard, 1833, the foundation stone of the new monastery was blessed by William Abraham, Bishop of Waterford and Lismore. It was called Mount Melleray in memory of the motherhouse. In 1835 the monastery was created an abbey, and Ryan, unanimously elected, received the abbatial blessing from Abraham, this being the first abbatial blessing in Ireland since the Protestant Reformation. It was from Mount Melleray that a small colony of monks was dispatched to found the English Mount Saint Bernard Abbey in 1835. Daniel O'Connell supported the endeavor, and visited the abbey in 1838.

Ryan undertook the work of completing the abbey but died on 9 December 1845. His successor, Joseph Ryan, resigned after two years. Bruno Fitzpatrick succeeded as abbot in September 1848. In 1849, he founded New Melleray Abbey, near Dubuque, Iowa, U.S.A., and, in 1878, Mount Saint Joseph Abbey, Roscrea, County Tipperary, Ireland. He also founded the Ecclesiastical Seminary of Mount Melleray. Originating in a small school formed by Ryan in 1843, it was developed by Fitzpatrick and his successors.

During his July 1849 visit to neighbouring Dromana House, Scottish essayist Thomas Carlyle paid a visit to Mount Melleray and described the abbey in some detail, noting particularly the huge vats of "stirabout" or porridge the monks prepared for a large number of famine refugees that waited for food at the entrance to the monastery: "Entrance; squalid hordes of beggars, sit waiting" and "nasty tubs of cold stirabout (coarsest I ever saw) for beggars"(p. 90). He notes that the monastery "must have accumulated several thousand pounds of property in these seventeen ... years, in spite of its continual charities to beggars."

In 1900 the "Kilgrovan Stones", five stones with Ogham inscriptions, found in 1857, were transferred to the Abbey by Patrick Power.

Fitzpatrick died 4 December 1893, and was succeeded by Carthage Delaney, who was blessed 15 January 1894, and presided over Mount Melleray for thirteen years. His successor was Marius O'Phelan, solemnly blessed by Richard Alphonsus Sheehan, Bishop of Waterford, 15 August 1908. O'Phelan resumed building on the abbey, buying the great cut limestone blocks from Mitchelstown Castle (28 miles west), which had been looted and burnt by the IRA in 1922. In 1925, the owners of Mitchelstown Castle dismantled the ruins and the stones were transported from Mitchelstown by steam lorry, two consignments a day for at least five years. As the Abbey was being laid out, O'Phelan died and his successor, Celsus O'Connell, continued to the monumental task. He opted for a more prominent site directly over the mortal remains of 180 of his fellow Cistercians. The monks ended up with far more stones than they needed and these were eventually stacked in fields around the monastery.

In 1954 six monks (eight more in 1955) went to found a small Trappist abbey in a remote, rural area of New Zealand, the Southern Star Abbey.

Eamon Fitzgerald, abbot of Mount Melleray, was abbot general of the order from 2008 to 2022.

Mount Melleray Abbey closed in January 2025. The remaining six monks joined Mount Saint Joseph Abbey, Roscrea.

=== Abbots ===
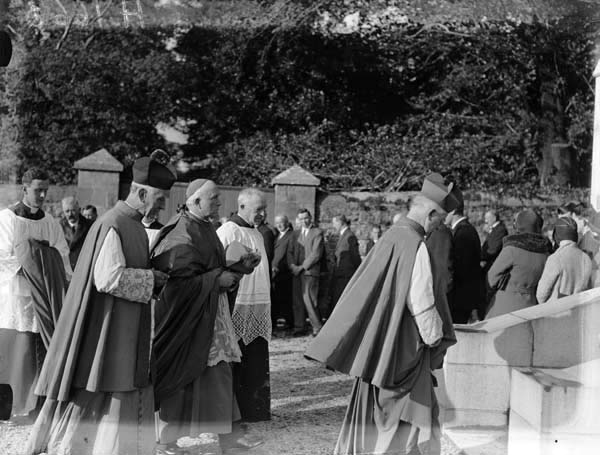
Mount Melleray Abbey on the day of the consecration of the new abbot, Stanislaus Hickey, in 1931

- Vincent de Paul Ryan (1833-1845)
- Joseph Mary Ryan (1846-1848)
- Bartholomew (Bruno) Fitzpatrick (1848-1893)
- John (Carthage) Delaney (1894-1908)
- Richard (Marius) O'Phelan (1908-1931)
- Stanislaus Hickey (1931-1933)
- Celsus O'Connell (1933-1957)
- Finbar Cashman (1957-1971)
- Pól Ó hAonusa (Paul Hennessy) (1971–75)
- Edward Ducey (1976-1980)
- Justin MacCarthy (1980-1989)
- Eamon Fitzgerald (1989 - 2008)
- Augustine McGregor (2010-2014)
- Boniface McGinley (acting abbot)
- Richard Purcell (2017–2021) previously abbot of Mount Saint Joseph Abbey, Roscrea (2009-2017).

== In literature ==
James Joyce mentions Mount Melleray in "The Dead", a short story in his 1914 collection Dubliners.

It is famous in literature due to Seán Ó Ríordáin's poem Cnoc Mellerí in Eireaball Spideoige (1952).

== Boarding school ==
Since its early days, Mount Melleray educated both clerical and lay students. In 1972 it was announced that the boarding school was to close and it closed in 1974. In June 2019 the Mount Mellery College Past Pupils held its reunion in Melleray.

In 1977 the Catholic Boy Scouts of Ireland held its jubilee celebrations at Mount Melleray and in 1979 the former boarding school was acquired by the organisation, now part of Scouting Ireland, and developed it into the Mount Melleray National Scout and Activity Centre.

=== Past pupils of Mount Melleray College ===
- Peter Callanan - former Cork County Councillor, and member of Seanad Eireann
- John Carroll - Bishop of Lismore, Australia
- Henry Doyle - medical doctor and Australian politician
- Jeremiah Doyle - Irish missionary in Australia who became a Bishop of Lismore
- John Dunne - Bishop of Bathurst, Australia
- Eamon Fitzgerald - the first Irishman to serve as Abbot General of the order of Cistercians
- William Henry Grattan Flood - author, composer and musicologist, student 1872-1876
- Tom Hayes - former minister of state, senator and TD for South Tipperary
- Michael Hurley - teacher, theologian, and co-founder of the Irish School of Ecumenics
- James Maher (1840-1905) - Bishop of Port Augusta, Australia (1896-1905)
- Bartholomew MacCarthy - historian and Irish language scholar
- Daniel Mullins (1929-2019) - Bishop in the Archdiocese of Cardiff (1987-2001)
- James O’Gorman - second prior of New Melleray Abbey
- Michael Olden - former president of Maynooth College
- Patrick Phelan - Bishop of Sale, Victoria, Australia
- Michael Kennedy Ryan - priest, teacher, and chairman of Thurles G.A.A. Club
- Thomas Ryan - Bishop of Clonfert, Ireland
- Clement Smyth — first prior of New Melleray Abbey

== See also ==
- List of abbeys and priories in Ireland (County Waterford)
- Mount Saint Joseph Abbey / Cistercian College, Roscrea - abbey and secondary school, of which Mount Melleray was the parent abbey.
- Portglenone Abbey (Bethlehem Abbey), County Antrim.
- Bolton Abbey, Moone, County Kildare.
- Mellifont Abbey, Collon, County Louth.
