= Melleray Abbey =

Abbey in La Meilleraye-de-Bretagne, France

Coordinates: 47°32′54″N 1°22′40″W

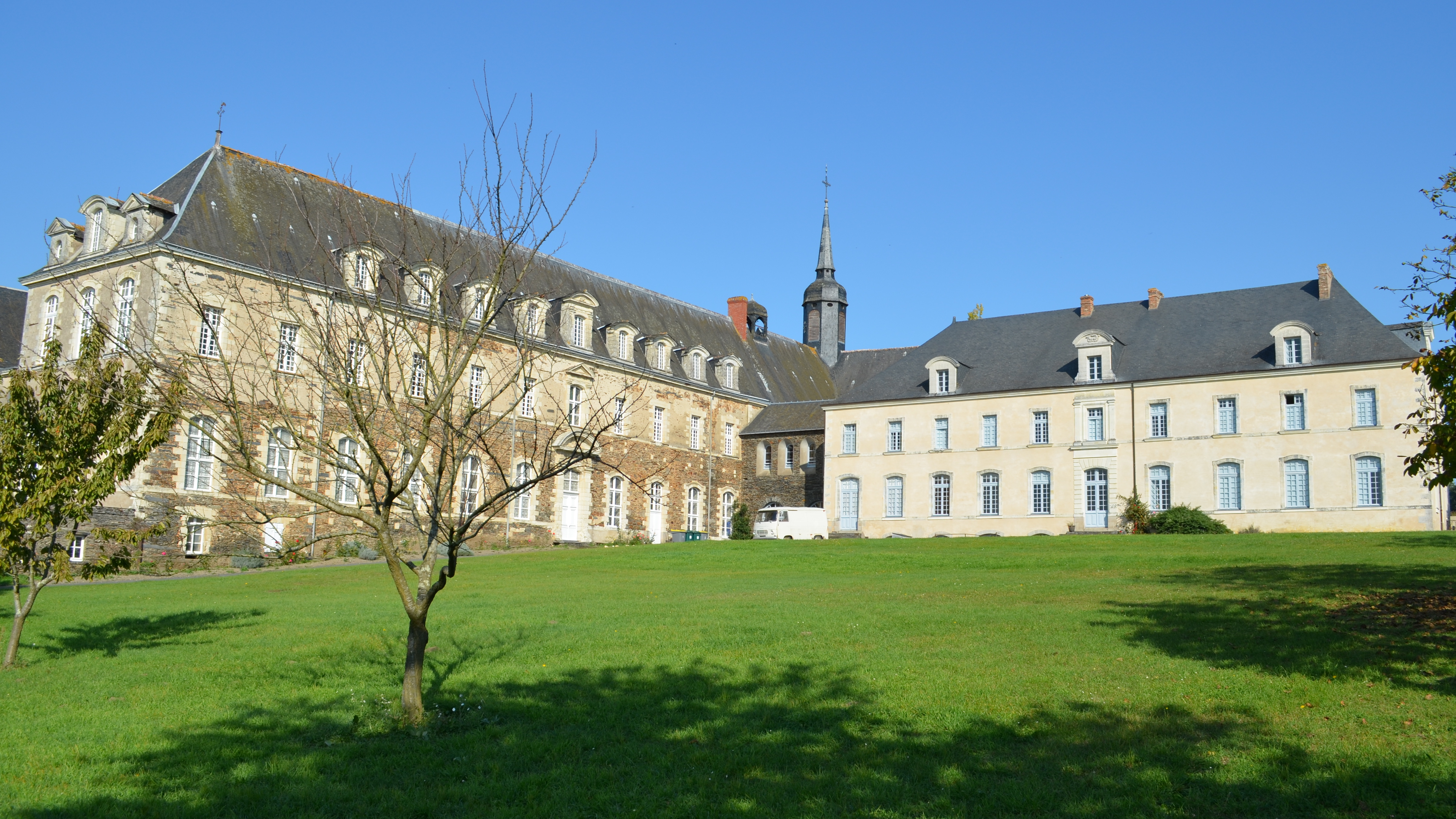
View of Melleray Abbey buildings

Melleray Abbey (French: Abbaye de Notre-Dame-de-Melleray) was a Cistercian monastery, founded about the year 1134 (892 years ago). It was situated in La Meilleraye-de-Bretagne in the vicinity of Châteaubriant in Brittany, in the present Loire-Atlantique, France, and in the Diocese of Nantes. Between 1817 and 2016 it was a house of Trappist monks. Since 2016 it has been used by the Chemin Neuf Community.

== History ==
Foulques, abbot of Pontrond in Anjou, which was founded from Louroux Abbey (itself a daughter foundation of Cîteaux), sent monks for the foundation of a monastery in Brittany. They chose a solitary location near Old Melleray, shown them by Rivallon, pastor of Auverné, which Alain de Moisdon, proprietor of the place, donated to them. According to legend, two of the founding brothers, spending the night in the forest, found in the hollow trunk of the tree under which they slept, a honeycomb, which supplied them with the food they desperately needed. This hollow tree marked the spot of the site of their new monastery, Meilleraie, which means honeycomb, and which in the long course of time has become Melleray.

Guitern, the first abbot, erected the original monastery in 1145, but the church was not completed until 1183, under Geffroy, the fourth abbot.

A small monastery built for about twelve monks, Melleray remained regular in observance until during the sixteenth and seventeenth centuries, when relaxation prevailed. Etienne de Brezé (1544) was the first commendatory abbot, and from his time the monastery declined, until toward the end of the seventeenth century when, through the efforts of Jouard, vicar-general of the order, the Rule of St. Benedict was re-introduced, and the monastic buildings restored. In 1791 it was suppressed, and the few remaining religious were dispersed.

This, however, was not the end of Melleray. The Trappists, expelled from France, took refuge at Valsainte in Switzerland; from there Augustine de Lestrange established them in various parts of the world. Through the generosity of Thomas Weld, a wealthy English Catholic and the father of Cardinal Weld, they settled (1795) at Lulworth, Dorset, England, where they established a priory, St. Susan's. This was soon created an abbey, and Antoine de Beauregard was elected the first abbot (1813). In 1817, with changed conditions and the restoration of the Bourbons, the monks of Lulworth returned to France, and settled at Melleray.

Although much of the soil of their property was stony and sterile they applied to it the skill learned from the improved methods of English farming, introducing new types of plows and the first threshing machine ever used in Brittany. The restored abbey flourished, increasing from fifty-seven to one hundred and ninety-two members in twelve years. During the Revolution of 1830 they were again persecuted, especially those of foreign birth, of whom they had a great number. To make homes for these they founded Mount Melleray Abbey (1833) in Ireland and Mount Saint Bernard Abbey (1835) in England. Abbot Antoine de Beauregard (d. 1839) was succeeded first by Abbot Maxime, then by a second Abbot Antoine, and then by Abbot Eugene Vachette.

Under Antoine II several monasteries were established, among them Gethsemani Abbey (1848) in the United States. Abbot Eugène, elected in 1875, was for many years the vicar-general of the Congregation of La Grande Trappe, and was instrumental in effecting the reunion into a single order of the three congregations into which the Trappists were then - 1892 - divided).

In 2015, the Trappist monks announced that they would leave the abbey in 2016, and give charge of it to the Chemin Neuf Community.

== See also ==
- Mount Melleray Abbey
- New Melleray Abbey
