= Irish School of Ecumenics =

Institute of Trinity College Dublin

The Irish School of Ecumenics (ISE) is an institute of Trinity College Dublin, dedicated to the study and promotion of peace and reconciliation in Ireland and throughout the world. The school is located in Dublin and Belfast, and consists of eight permanent full-time academic staff, visiting academic staff, postdoctoral fellows, and administrative staff. ISE has 82 M.Phil. students and 39 Ph.D. and M.Litt. research students.

== History ==
The Irish School of Ecumenics was co-founded in 1970 by Father Michael Hurley, S.J., a Jesuit priest and strong proponent of ecumenism, who served as the school's director until 1980. The General Secretary of the World Council of Churches, Dr. Eugene Carson Blake, attended the school's formal inauguration in Milltown. The use of the facilities of the Jesuit Milltown Park was available to the ISE.

Father Hurley and the establishment of the Irish School of Ecumenics were strongly opposed by the then Archbishop of Dublin of the Roman Catholic Archdiocese of Dublin, John Charles McQuaid.

Diocesan archival documents released in the 2000s revealed that Father Hurley and the school caused Archbishop McQuaid "anguish." Archbishop McQuaid, a deeply conservative Catholic, responded by banning Father Hurley from speaking within his "sphere of jurisdiction," meaning the Archbishop of Dublin. However, McQuaid reneged on the ban following the intervention by Fr Cecil McGarry, Dublin's Jesuit provincial (and previously Rector of Milltown), on Hurley's behalf.

From 1972 the University of Hull (and supported by Prof. Anthony Hanson of its Dept. of Theology) validated some programmes e.g. MA in Ecumenical Theology, for the ISE, this continued until 1982 when Trinity College Dublin accredited these qualifications (as the National University of Ireland had been prohibited from awarding theology degrees).

Archbishop McQuaid died in 1973. He was succeeded by Archbishop Dermot Ryan, who remained displeased by the activities of the School of Ecumenics and Father Hurley. Father Hurley stepped down as the director in 1980 saying, "towards the end of the school’s first decade it seemed best to remove myself from the scene." The relationship between Irish School of Ecumenics and the Roman Catholic Archdiocese of Dublin slowly began to improve.

Hurley's directorship would be succeeded by the Irish Presbyterian theologian Robin Boyd, from 1980 to 1987, who was formerly a missionary to India and active in interfaith dialogue.

From the 1980s, Brian Lennon SJ and later Declan Deane SJ, based in Portadown with the ISE ran certificate course in ecumenics and peace studies, at Magee College, Derry in association with the University of Ulster and Trinity College, this certificate was also available from the Columbanus Community in Belfast which became the ISE campus in Belfast. Courses were also run in connection with Queen's University Belfast.

Cardinal Desmond Connell, who served as Archbishop of Dublin between 1988 and 2004, later became the first archbishop to become a formal patron of the Irish School of Ecumenics. Archival papers related to Archbishop John Charles McQuaid's opposition to the School of Ecumenism were uncovered by the Archdiocese of Dublin in the 2000s. In 2008, Dublin Archbishop Diarmuid Martin issued an apology to Father Hurley for his treatment by Archbishop McQuaid during the late 1960s and early 1970s. The face-to-face apology, which was described as "good-humored" by the Irish Times, took place at the Milltown Park, Jesuit community in South Dublin, where the ISE was based. Archbishop Martin apologized to Hurley "for some misunderstandings on the part of my predecessors." Father Hurley, who called Martin's speech a "magnanimous apology," stated that he felt a "great sense of relief and joy and gratitude."

In 2008 the ISE purchased the Columbanus Centre on the Antrim Road, which became the ISE Belfast base.

In 2001 the ISE became formally integrated into Trinity College, in 2016, the ISE moved from the Jesuit Milltown Park to Trinity College Dublins Campus.

== Present ==
The Irish School of Ecumenics has eight full-time staff members. The Dublin location of the ISE is on the campus of Trinity College Dublin as a part of the new Loyola Institute. The Belfast location of ISE is in north Belfast in its own building. The Irish School of Ecumenics along with the Loyola Institute, which will have six full-time staff members, will compose a centre with common interests in the study of theology, peace, & reconciliation.

== Notable people ==
Directors

- 1960–1980: Fr Michael Hurley SJ
- 1980–1987: Dr Robin Boyd
- 1987–1990: Dr John D'Arcy May
- 1990–1994: Rev Alan Falconer
- 1994–1999: Sr Geraldine Smyth OP
- 1999–2004: Bishop Kenneth Kearon
- 2005: John May
- 2006–2010: Prof Linda Hogan

Alumni

- 2017: Princess Alexandra of Luxembourg
