= Matthew O'Donnell =

Irish priest and 26th President of Maynooth College

Monsignor Matthew O'Donnell MA, BD, DPh was an Irish priest who served as the 26th president of St. Patrick's College, Maynooth.

He was born in Mungret, Co Limerick, in 1932 and studied at St Mary's College, Galway, before moving to begin his studies for the priesthood at Maynooth where he was ordained for service in the diocese of Galway. His early aptitude for philosophy (his main interest was the works of David Hume) was recognised and he received his doctorate in Philosophy from University of Louvain, becoming Professor of Ethics in 1960.

His straightforward manner and capacity for thoughtful decision-making saw him appointed Dean of the Faculty of Philosophy in 1973 and later still, vice-president of Maynooth in 1980. to Monsignor Miceal Ledwith. When Ledwith resigned suddenly in 1994 in contested and perhaps controversial circumstances, it was natural that the then Irish Primate Cardinal Cahal Daly would press for his old friend and philosophical colleague Matt O'Donnell to be made College President. In that position, his generosity of service to Maynooth as it headed into its bicentenary year was notable.

Dr. O'Donnell died on 7 September 1996, having suffered a heart attack earlier that year. Two postgraduate scholarships for Maynooth College were named in his honour one in Philosophy and one in Theology. He spent some of his childhood in Maynooth where his mother was from and is buried with his parents in Grangewilliam Cemetery just outside Maynooth town.
