= Thomas Messingham =

Irish hagiologist

Thomas Messingham was an Irish hagiologist born in the Diocese of Meath. Stephen White, Henry Fitzsimon, and Messingham were "forerunners in searching for manuscripts containing Lives of Irish saints." His contributions to liturgical modernisation, history, and hagiography were significant.

== Life ==
He studied at the Irish College, Douai before going to the Irish College, Paris, proceeding to the degree of Doctor of Sacred Theology (S.T.D.). Among the Franciscan Manuscripts in Dublin is a tract sent by David Rothe, Vice-Primate of All Ireland, addressed to my "loving friend Mr. Thomas Messingham at his chambers in Paris", dated 1615. It is evident that Messingham was one of the staff of the Irish College in that city at this date and was commencing his studies on Irish saints.

In 1620, he published Offices of Saints Patrick, Brigid, Columba, and other Irish saints, and in the following year, was appointed rector of the Irish College, Paris, in succession to his friend and diocesan, Thomas Dease, who was promoted to the Bishopric of Meath, on 5 May 1621. Messingham was honoured by the Holy See, was raised to the dignity of prothonotary Apostolic and acted as an agent for many Irish bishops. His judgement was valued and sought by his colleagues in Ireland. In addition to seeking materials with a view to an ecclesiastical history of Ireland, Messingham was rector of the Irish College and organized the course of studies to send forth capable missionaries to work in their native country. He got the college affiliated formally with the University of Paris and, in 1626, got the approbation of the Archbishop of Paris for the rules he had drawn up for the government of the Irish seminary.

In 1624, he published his famous work on Irish saints, Florilegium Insulæ Sanctorum, in Paris, containing also a treatise on St. Patrick's Purgatory in Lough Derg. In the same year, he was appointed by the Holy See to the Deanery of St. Patrick's Cathedral, Dublin, in succession to Henry Byrne. Still, this position was merely honorary since the Protestant dean enjoyed all the temporalities by patent from the Crown. Messingham had a lengthy correspondence with Father Luke Wadding, O.F.M., and was frequently consulted by the Roman authorities in selecting suitable ecclesiastics to fill the vacant Irish sees. On 15 July 1630, he wrote to Wadding that he feared it was in vain to hope for any indulgences in religious disabilities from King Charles I. Between the years 1632 and 1638, he laboured for the Irish Church in various capacities, but his name disappears after the latter year.
