= Robin Boyd (theologian) =

Easy

- Born: 14 May 1924; Belfast, Northern Ireland
- Died: 14 June 2018 (aged 94); Edinburgh, Scotland
- Occupations: Theologian and missionary
- Known for: Indian Christian theology
- Spouse(s): Frances Paton, Anne Booth-Clibborn (née Forrester)

Academic background
- Education: Trinity College Dublin, New College, Edinburgh
- Doctoral advisor: T. F. Torrance and John McIntyre

Academic work
- Discipline: Christian theology
- Institutions: Irish School of Ecumenics

Robin H. S. Boyd (14 May 1924 – 14 June 2018) was an Irish theologian and missionary to India, ordained in the Irish Presbyterian Church. He also worked with the Student Christian Movement and was a presbyter in the Church of North India.

== Biography ==
Boyd was born in Belfast in 1924, to Irish missionaries to India. He pursued undergraduate studies in classics at Trinity College Dublin, which was interrupted from 1943 to 1945 for war service, and went on for theological studies at New College, Edinburgh. He worked for two years with the Student Christian Movement as secretary to theological colleges (1951–1953), studied briefly in Basel with Karl Barth and Oscar Cullmann, before marrying his first wife and SCM colleague Frances Paton (granddaughter of John Gibson Paton) and moving to India as Christian missionaries in 1954. In 1959, Boyd returned to Edinburgh to begin his PhD on the subject "The Place of Dogmatic Theology in the Indian Church."

He was appointed to the Gujarat United School of Theology in Ahmedabad in 1961 and witnessed the formation of the Church of North India in 1970. In 1974, after twenty years as a missionary in India, Boyd took up the parish ministry in Melbourne and witnessed the formation of another church union, the Uniting Church in Australia in 1977. He later served as director of the Irish School of Ecumenics (1980–1987) before returning to Melbourne for parish ministry and retiring in 1994. His wife Frances died in 1998 and, after a brief visit to Scotland, he married Anne Booth-Clibborn (née Forrester) a former Church of Scotland social worker in Kenya.

Boyd died on 14 June 2018 in Edinburgh.

== Indian Christian theology ==
Boyd is best known for his writings in Indian Christian theology. His PhD thesis was published in 1969 as An Introduction to Indian Christian Theology, and revised and expanded in 1975. In India, this work is described as the "standard textbook at the B.Th. and B.D. levels for the course in Indian Christian theology."

== Works ==
- Boyd, Robin (1975). An Introduction to Indian Christian Theology (Revised ed.). Madras: Christian Literature Society.
- ——— (1974). India and the Latin Captivity of the Church. London: Cambridge University Press. ISBN 9780521203715.
- ——— (1988). Ireland: Christianity Discredited Or Pilgrim's Progress?. Geneva: WCC Publications. ISBN 978-2-8254-0922-0.
- ——— (2007). The Witness of the Student Christian Movement. London: SPCK. ISBN 978-0-281-05877-8.
