= James Bernard Clinch =

James Bernard Clinch (1771-1834) was a professor, lawyer and pamphleteer. On the recommendation of politician and writer Edmund Burke he was appointed as one of the first professors at the newly established St. Patrick's College, Maynooth in 1795 first as chair of Humanity (Belle Lettres), then in 1798 as Professor of Rhetoric, resigning in 1802. In 1795 he was one of the four professors present in Maynooth the others being Rev. Maurice Aherne (Dogmatic Theology), Rev. Pierre-Justin Delort (Mathematics and Natural Philosophy), and Rev. John Chetwode Eustace (Rhetoric).

He was the fifth son of Joseph Clinch, a merchant of James's Street, Dublin, and Margaret Higgins. He was educated at Rev. Thomas Betagh's school and studied at the Irish College, Rome (where he had studied with some future Irish priests such as Dr. Patrick Ryan future Bishop of Ferns). Returning to Ireland choosing not to be ordained a priest, he worked as a teacher at Inch Academy, Balbriggan, before joining the staff at Maynooth. After Maynooth, he joined the Middle Temple, earned an LLB degree, and was called to the Irish bar in 1807. He married Lisa Brennan, and two of his sons, both educated at the lay college in Maynooth, also became barristers.

He died on 25 October 1834.
