= Pierre-Justin Delort =

French priest and academic

Pierre-Justin Delort (1758-1835), often anglicized to Peter, was a French priest and academic who was exiled following the French Revolution and moved to Ireland. He was born in Bordeaux in December 1748. A priest in the Archdiocese of Bordeaux in France, he held a Doctor of Laws from the University of Bordeaux. Delort was a professor of philosophy at the Collège de Guyenne, before the Revolution. Following the revolution, he emigrated to London.

== Maynooth College ==
In 1795 he was appointed the first professor of Natural Philosophy and Mathematics at the newly established Royal College, of St. Patrick, Maynooth, Ireland. Delort was one of the first four professors present in Maynooth in 1795, the others being former professor of philosophy in Paris, Maurice Aherne (Dogmatic Theology), James Bernard Clinch (Humanity), and John Chetwode Eustace (Rhetoric). Delort's first class contained only three students.

Delort was one of the four exiles from France; the others being Francois Anglade (Sorbonne, Paris), André Darré (Toulouse), and Louis-Gilles Delahogue (Sorbonne, Paris), sometimes called the French founding fathers of Maynooth.

In 1801 following the concordat between the papacy and the French government, he returned to France initially for six months on a leave of absence, but he never returned to Maynooth; his fellow Frenchman Darré became chair of natural philosophy and mathematics.

== Return to France and Eucharistic miracle of Bordeaux ==
Delort became canon and secretary to the Archdiocese of Bordeaux; he also served as Chair of Theology at the local Seminary. While saying Mass in the Church of St. Eulalia in Bordeaux on 3 February (Septuagesima Sunday) 1822, Abbot Delort, substituting for Venerable Pierre Bienvenu Noaille who usually said Mass for the nuns, consecrated the host. When he looked at the host, Jesus appeared in the host. This became known as a Eucharistic miracle.

== Legacy ==
The Delort Prize is awarded for outstanding performance in Pure Mathematics in the First Year Examinations at Maynooth University and is named in his honour.
