= James McMahon (priest) =

Irish-born priest

Monsignor James McMahon (1817–1901) was an Irish-born priest.

== Education ==
McMahon was born in County Tyrone and studied for the priesthood at Maynooth College (where his uncle - Michael Montague (priest) was president); he moved to France and joined the Society of the Priests of Saint Sulpice, and studied divinity in the Seminary in Paris, from which he was posted to Montreal, Canada, to the Suplician Seminary there.

== Career ==
In 1843, McMahon moved to the United States and spent 40 years in New York City as a priest. He was pastor in St. Mary's Church; during his time as parish priest he oversaw the building of the St. John the Evangelist's Church (Manhattan), a parish he had moved to in 1850. Being financially prudent, he managed the payment off of the debts accrued in building the new church. A musician himself, Fr. McMahon took great interest in the church pipe organ and its construction.

Although not born into wealth, he was left a small legacy which he invested in real estate, which gave him considerable wealth; he was noted for his business acumen (The New York Times called him the richest priest in American in his obituary.) He donated his wealth to Church organisations and educational bodies in his latter years.

In 1891 he moved to The Catholic University of America(CUA) in Washington and remained there until he died on 15 April 1901.

He donated money to the Catholic University of America (some $400,000), and the McMahon Hall was built (for $250,000) in 1895 for the School of Philosophy. Also in Maynooth he funded the construction of the Aula Maxima completed in 1893. His papers were left to the CUA.
