= Michael Montague =

Michael Montague may refer to:

- Michael Montague, Baron Montague of Oxford (1932–1999), British businessman and politician
- Michael Montague (priest) (1773–1845), Irish priest and educator
