= André Darré =

French priest and academic (1750–1833)[

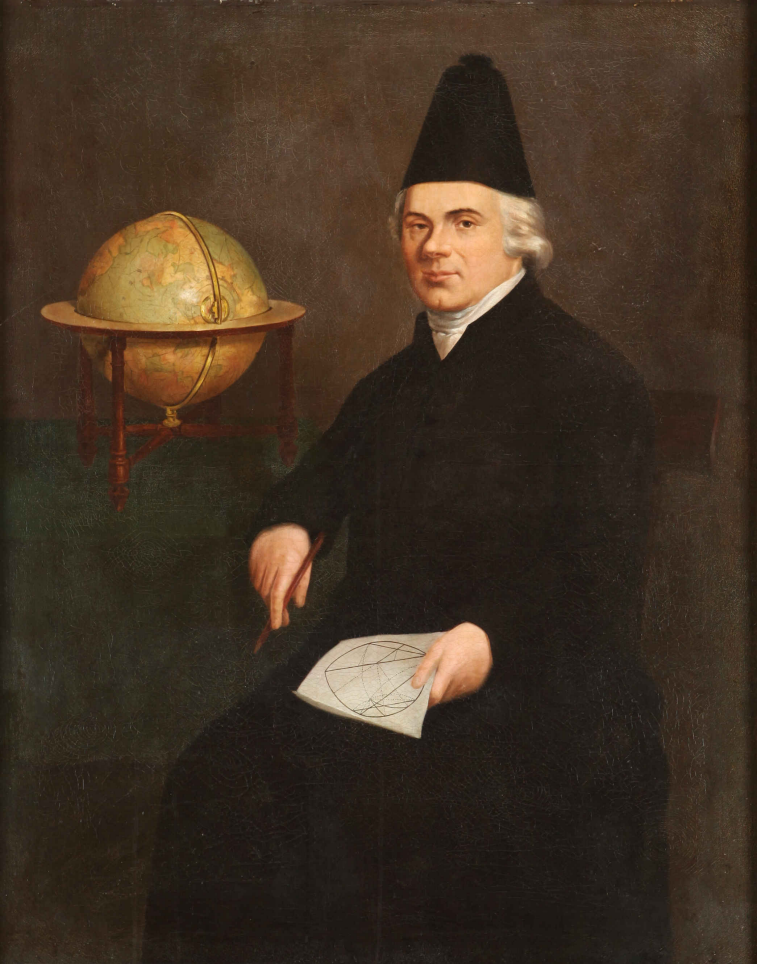
- Darré, Portrait in St. Patrick’s College, Maynooth
- Born: 5 February 1750; Montaut, near Auch, Gascony, Kingdom of France
- Died: 1833 (aged 82–83); Auch, France
- Occupations: Mathematics, natural philosophy

Academic background
- Education: University of Toulouse

Academic work
- Institutions: Royal College of St. Patrick, Maynooth
- Notable works: Elements of Geometry, with both Plane and Spherical Trigonometry (1813)

Personal life
- Known for: French exile academic

Religious life
- Religion: Catholic
- Church: Sainte-Marie d'Auch (1813–1833)
- Profession: Priest, academic
- Ordination: 1774

Senior posting
- Predecessor: Pierre-Justin Delort (as Professor of Natural Philosophy & Mathematics)
- Successor: Cornelius Denvir (as Professor of Natural Philosophy & Mathematics)
- Previous post: Professor of philosophy in Toulouse; parish priest in France

André (Andrew) Darré (1750–1833) was a French priest and academic. He was one of the four exiles from France, the others being professors Francois Anglade, Louis-Gilles Delahogue, and Pierre-Justin Delort, sometimes called the French "founding fathers" of Maynooth College in Ireland.

== Life ==
A native of the small town of Montaut, Auch near Toulouse in Gascony, France, he was born on 5 February 1750. Darré studied philosophy and theology at the University of Toulouse, was ordained a priest in Auch in 1774, and became a professor of philosophy in Toulouse.

Darré was exiled following the French Revolution and moved to Ireland in 1793, where he was appointed Professor of Logic, Metaphysics and Ethics in 1795 at the newly established Royal College of St. Patrick, Maynooth, and Professor of Mathematics and Natural Philosophy from 1801 to 1813. He succeeded fellow French exile, the Rev. Pierre-Justin Delort, who had returned to France in 1801, as Chair of Natural Philosophy and Mathematics.

During the Irish rebellion of 1803, which occurred close to the college, Darre helped negotiate the surrender of the local rebels. He returned to France in 1813 (and was succeeded in the Chair of Natural Philosophy and Mathematics by his former pupil Cornelius Denvir), and was serving as canon of Sainte-Marie d'Auch when he died in 1833.

== Publications ==
A copy of his work is stored in the Russell Library, Maynooth.

- Elements of Geometry, with both Plane and Spherical Trigonometry. Designed for the use of the Students at the R. C. College, Maynooth, by André Darré, printed and published by H. Fitzpatrick of 4, Capel Street, Dublin 1813.

== Legacy ==
His textbook was used by his successors in Maynooth Professors Denvir and Callan, and Rev. Dr. Callan produced a revised edition in 1844. The Darré Exhibitions prize, named in his honour, is awarded to students based on their leaving certificate results, on entry to first-year Mathematics at Maynooth University.
