= James McCaffrey =

James McCaffrey may refer to:

- James McCaffrey (actor) (1959–2023), American actor
- James D. McCaffrey, American software researcher and author
- Jim McCaffrey (footballer) (born 1951), English footballer
- Jim McCaffrey (basketball), American basketball player

== See also ==
- James MacCaffrey (1875–1935), Irish priest
- James P. McCaffrey Trophy, a Canadian Football League trophy
