= Gerard Mitchell (priest) =

Catholic priest and university administrator (d. 1990)

Gerard Mitchell was a senior Irish Catholic priest, a priest of the Archdiocese of Tuam and President of Maynooth College from 1959–1967. Thereafter he became parish priest of Ballinrobe until his death in 1990.

Mitchell was appointed Professor of Dogmatic and Moral Theology at Maynooth in 1932, and served as Vice-President from 1958 until his appointment as president in 1959 following the death of Edward Kissane.

His time as President of the National Seminary was marked by the Second Vatican Council and an opening up the College to wider Irish life, including the introduction of lay i.e. non-seminarians to the College. In 1966 he welcome veterans of the 1916 Easter Rising to the College.

Academic offices
Preceded by Rev. Edward Kissane	President of St. Patrick's College, Maynooth; 1959–1967	Succeeded by Rev. Patrick Corish
Preceded by Rev. William J Conway	Vice-president of St. Patrick's College, Maynooth; 1958–1959	Succeeded by Rev. Patrick J. Hamell
