= Francois Anglade =

French priest and academic

Francois (Francis) Anglade (1758–1834), was a French priest and academic, who was exiled following the French revolution and moved to Ireland.

== Life ==
=== Pre-revolution ===
Anglade from Millau (in Occitan, Milhau), studied at the College of Rodez before going to Paris where he graduated from the Sorbonne in Theology and Philosophy, and became a Professor of Divinity at the University of Paris, Sorbonne, in 1791, just before the revolution.

=== Exile in Wales ===
Finding refuge in Britain, he worked as a gardener for a Protestant family in Wales, where he would regularly return to holiday while teaching in Maynooth, maintaining his passion for gardening he would return with plants unavailable in Ireland for the college.

=== Professor at Maynooth ===
In 1802, he was appointed the professor of Logic and Metaphysics and Ethics, at the newly established Royal College, of St. Patrick, Maynooth, Ireland, succeeding fellow French exile André Darré. In 1810, he moved to the chair of Moral Theology succeeding his fellow Frenchman, Sorbonne alumni, and faculty, Louis-Gilles Delahogue who recommended him. He wrote the moral theology textbook that was used in Maynooth.

Anglade was one of the four exiles from France, the others being Louis-Gilles Delahogue(Sorbonne, Paris), André Darré (Toulouse), and Pierre-Justin Delort (Bordeaux), sometimes called the French "founding fathers" of Maynooth.

Anglade was credited with bringing the Presentation Sisters to Maynooth, setting up their school in the former Charter School, and assisted with the building of the convent chapel in 1832. The Presentation Sisters would later provide laundry services to the college, and a hostel for sisters studying in Maynooth. Anglade, along with Delahouge, Brown, and John MacHale, were signatories to the because of the two French clerics, the so-called Sorbonne Manifesto, in Maynooth, which stated that the training they gave to priests in Maynooth was not in conflict with the government.

=== Legacies and death ===
Anglade was the executor of Delahogue's will. Charles McNally Bishop of Clogher was executor of Anglade's will, his papers were placed in the Clogher Diocesan Archive. He remained in Maynooth until his death in 1834, and he is buried in the college cemetery.
