= Walter McDonald (professor) =

Walter McDonald was an Irish Roman Catholic priest, theologian and Professor.

== Life and education ==
McDonald was born in 1854 in Nicholastown, Mooncoin, County Kilkenny. He was educated at St Kieran's College, Kilkenny, and St. Patrick's College, Maynooth, and was ordained to the priesthood in 1876 for the Diocese of Ossory.

He taught first at St Kieran's College before being appointed Professor of Dogmatic Theology at Maynooth where he taught for over 40 years until his death in 1920. Dr McDonald served as prefect of the Postgraduate students in Dunboyne Establishment in Maynooth, founding the Irish Theological Quarterly in 1909, which ceased publication after his death, but was re-published from 1954 on, and still published today from Maynooth College.

== Professional work and reputation ==
He was known for his opposition to the use of violence in the Irish Nationalist struggle for an independent Ireland and addressed the War of Independence (Ireland) in Some Ethical Questions on War and Peace, with Special References to Ireland in 1919. He maintained a wide circle of friends including the playwright Sean O'Casey and other figures in Irish cultural life.

In the bicentenary history of Maynooth by Patrick Corish one reviewer assesses McDonald's place in that history as merited because he was "the only original theologian Maynooth produced in its first century" who had to "resort to extraordinary means so that his criticisms of seminary education could be published posthumously."

This is a reference to his posthumously published reminiscences in which the independent, outspoken and greatly loved scholar-priest, deplored teaching through Latin and the absence of "free and open competition in all appointments to the staff."

== Publications ==
- History of the Parish of Mooncoin by Rev. Walter McDonald, D. D., Maynooth.
- Reminiscences of a Maynooth Professor, by Dr. Walter McDonald, edited by Denis Rolleston Gwynn (1925)
- Some Ethical Questions on War and Peace, by Rev. Dr. Walter McDonald, (1919)
