= Archivium Hibernicum =

- Discipline: History
- Language: English
- Edited by: Thomas O'Connor

Publication details
- History: 1912–present
- Publisher: Catholic Historical Society of Ireland (Ireland)
- Frequency: Annually

Standard abbreviations
- ISO 4: Arch. Hibernicum

Indexing
- ISSN: 0044-8745
- JSTOR: 00448745
- OCLC no.: 448043079

Links
- Journal homepage

Archivium Hibernicum is a peer-reviewed history journal that publishes archival sources and scholarly articles on Irish religious, cultural and political history and on the Irish abroad. It is published annually by the Catholic Historical Society of Ireland in co-operation with the history departments of St Patrick's College, Maynooth and Maynooth University.

The journal began publication in 1912 under the editorship of Dr James MacCaffrey, professor of ecclesiastical history at St Patrick's College, Maynooth. Its editor is the historian Thomas O'Connor of Maynooth University.

The Catholic Historical Society of Ireland, which publishes the journal, promotes the study of Irish ecclesiastical history and Irish history in general and organises an annual public conference in cooperation with its academic partners.

The society and its journal is associated with the history departments of St Patrick's College, Maynooth, and NUI Maynooth. It sponsors and promotes seminars and lectures on historical subjects.
