= Louis-Gilles Delahogue =

Louis-Gilles Delahogue (1739-1827) was a French priest and academic, who was exiled following the French Revolution and moved to Ireland. His surname particularly in French is sometimes written as De La Hogue. Delahogue graduated from the Sorbonne and was a Professor of Sacred Scripture at the University of Paris, Sorbonne and Royal Censor from 1772 until after the revolution (some 20 years). Initially, after the September massacres in Paris in 1792, Delahogue found refuge and employment in London, England, where he spent six years before he moved to Ireland. In 1798, he was appointed the professor of Moral Theology, at the newly established Royal College of St. Patrick, Maynooth, Ireland. In 1801 he moved from Moral Theology to succeed Rev. Maurice Aherne as Professor of Dogmatic Theology.

Delahogue was one of the four exiles from France the others being Francois Anglade (Sorbonne, Paris), André Darré (Toulouse), and Pierre-Justin Delort (Bordeaux), sometimes called the French founding fathers of Maynooth. As a result the early Maynooth was seen to have a French view or even Gallicanism, as opposed to Ultramontanism and in opposition to the Nationalist rebellions on 1798 and 1803.

He sought Anglade (a fellow Sorbonne exile) as his replacement as Professor of Theology, in 1810.

Delahogue along with Anglade, James Brown, and surprisingly considering his nationalism and agitation, McHale, were signatories in Maynooth to the Sorbonne Manifesto (so called because of the two French clerics), which stated that the training they gave to priests in Maynooth was not in conflict with the government.

Delahogue declined a chance to return to the Sorbonne in 1816, and remained at the Maynooth after his retirement in 1820, and died there on 9 May 1827, at the age of 88. He is buried in the College graveyard. Anglade was named as the executor of his will. As Charles McNally Bishop of Clogher, was executor of Anglade's will, Delahogue's papers were placed in the Diocesan Archive.

== Publications ==
His Tractatus was re-published and used in Maynooth throughout the nineteenth century.

- Tractatus de sacramentis in genere et de Eucharistia by Ludovicus Aegidius Delahogue, Dublin 1810.
- Tractatus de sacramento poenitentiae: ad usum theologiae candidatorum. Tres accedunt appendices, de purgatorio, de indulgentiis, et de censuris by Ludovicus Aegidius Delahogue. Published by Hugonis Fitzpatrick, 1813.
- Tractatus de ecclesia Christi, ad usum theologiae candidatorum: accedunt duae appendices, de traditione, et conciliis generalibus by Ludovicus Aegidius Delahogue. Published by Le Clere, 1816.
- Tractatus de religione: ad usum theologiæ candidatorum : Apud Maynooth, by Ludovicus Aegidius Delahogue, Published by R. Coyne, Dublin, 1835.
- Tractatus de mysterio SS. Trinitatis ad usum theologiae candidatorum by Ludovicus Aegidius Delahogue. Published by Richardi Coyne, 1822

He also published Exposé des motifs qui ont determiné le clergé de France à fuir la persécution et à se retirer en pays étrangers (London, 1794).
