= Denis Gargan =

Irish Catholic cleric, and educator

Denis Gargan was an Irish Catholic cleric, and educator, who served as St Patrick's College, Maynooth (Maynooth College).

== Early life and education ==
Born in 1819 in County Meath, where his father Patrick Gargan was a farmer, he was educated privately then at the Diocesan School in Navan, entering Maynooth College in 1836. He was ordained to the priesthood in 1843 for service in the Diocese of Meath, and was appointed professor of metaphysics at the Irish College in Paris.

== Career ==
Gargan was appointed professor of Humanity at Maynooth in 1845 and in 1859 to the chair of Ecclesiastical History. He served as vice president from 1885 to 1894, when he took up the position of president. He led the college during its centenary celebrations and was still in office at the time of his death.

Gargan briefly was appointed in 1863 to the parish of Duleek, Co. Meath, but resigned and returned to Maynooth.

Gargan served Vicar General of his native diocese and, upon being pointed College President was appointed Monsignor. He was a member of the Society for the Preservation of the Irish Language and the Royal Historical and Archaeological Society of Ireland.

Gargan died aged 84 on 28 August 1903, and buried on 1 September 1903.

== Publications ==
- The Ancient Church of Ireland By Denis Gargan, D.D., James Duffy Ltd., Dublin, 1864.
- The charity of the church, a proof of her divinity by Cardinal Gaetano Baluffi, (Introduction by Rev. Denis Gargan), M.H. Gill and Son, Dublin, 1885.

== See also ==
- Catholic Church in Ireland
