= Laurence F. Renehan =

Irish historian, author, administrator and Roman Catholic priest

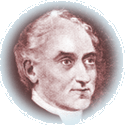
Laurence Renehan

Laurence F. Renehan (1797–1857) was an Irish historian, author, administrator and Roman Catholic priest who served as president of St Patrick's College, Maynooth from 1845 to 1857.

Renehan conducted extensive research on the history of Catholicism in Ireland.

== Biography ==
Renehan was born in 1797 at Longford Pass in the parish of Gurtnahoe, County Tipperary. He was educated first at Freshfield and then at Kilkenny. In September 1819, Renehan entered St Patrick's College as a student for the Archdiocese of Cashel to study logic. In 1825, Renehan was elected a Dunboyne student. On 15 September 1825, Renehan was appointed junior dean, and a few weeks later was ordained a priest.

On 27 July 1827 Renehan was elected professor of scripture at St Patrick's. He held this position until June 1834, when he became vice-president of the college. From 4 June 1841 to 24 June 1843, Renehan also filled the office of bursar and was instrumental in extricating the college from financial difficulties. In 1845, Renehan became president of St. Patrick's

While college president, Renehan commissioned Augustus Pugin to construct the buildings on St Mary's Square at the college. These buildings include the Russell Library and a large meeting-room that was later named after Renehan.

Renehan was a historian of the development of Catholicism in Ireland. He collected 79 volumes of early Irish Church manuscripts, housed today in the Russell Library.

Renehan served as St Patrick's president until his death on 27 July 1857. He is buried in a small cemetery on the campus.

== Works ==
- Collections on Irish Church History, Vol. 1: Irish Archbishops, not published during his lifetime. It was later edited by his colleague Daniel McCarthy and published in 1861 by C.M. Warren and Thomas Richardson, Dublin.
- Requiem Office
- Choir Manual of Sacred Music
- History of Music.
