= Aula Maxima, Maynooth =

Aula Maxima
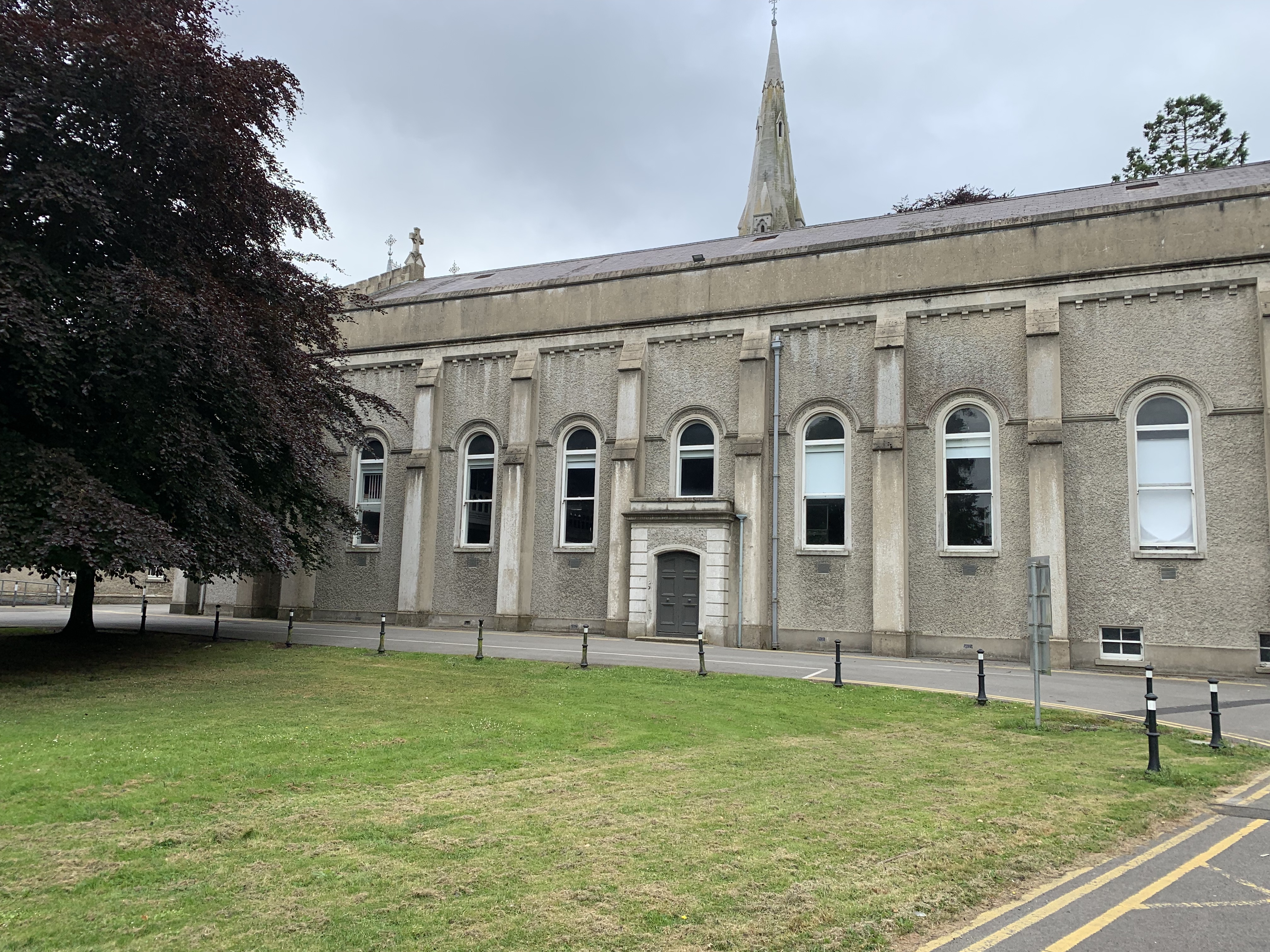
- The Aula Maxima

- Location within Ireland
- Full name: McMahon Hall
- Address: Maynooth University South Campus
- Location: Maynooth, County Kildare, Ireland
- Coordinates: 53.3803°N 6.5979°W
- Owner: Maynooth University
- Capacity: 350
- Type: Theatre
- Public transit: Maynooth railway station (1 km walk); Maynooth University bus stop (Bus Éireann route 115)

Construction
- Built: 1893
- Renovated: 1940 and 1985
- Cost: £3,000 (original building)

Aula Maxima (Latin pronunciation: [ˈau̯la ˈmaksɪma]), officially the McMahon Hall, is a theatre building in Maynooth, County Kildare, Ireland. It was built in 1893.

Aula Maxima comes from Latin, meaning great hall. The building is also known simply as "The Aula". It is situated on the south campus of Maynooth University and St Patrick's College, Maynooth and is the main theatre for the university, college and surrounding area. It also serves as the conferring hall of the university where the annual graduations take place. The Aula was also used as a cinema for students of the college, with the Maynooth Students' Union screening films there.

== History ==
Monsignor James McMahon of the Catholic University of America in Washington, DC originally gifted the building to St Patrick's College, his alma mater, and its construction was completed under the presidency of Bishop Robert Browne. The Aula Maxima, an exam hall, was completed between 1892 and 1893, and was renovated in the 1940s and again in the 1980s.

== Dramatic performances ==
Maynooth University's Drama Society (also known as the Roscian Players) is the resident company of Aula Maxima.

The venue has also hosted performances by St Patrick's College's dramatic society, Maynooth University Chamber Orchestra and Maynooth Community Players:

== Folklore ==
There are numerous stories relating to the reputed presence of a ghost in Aula Maxima. Simply known as the Aula Ghost, he is reputed to be the spirit of a projectionist who fell to his death from the projectionist's box in the 1940s. A number of superstitions exist regarding the Aula Ghost, including one in which the ghost reputedly turns a chair, placed near the Aula Maxima's projection box, to face away from the stage if he does not like a performance or its staging.

== See also ==
- Irish theatre
- List of Irish theatres and theatre companies
