= Irish Theological Quarterly =

- Discipline: Theology
- Language: English
- Edited by: Salvador Ryan

Publication details
- History: 1951–present
- Publisher: SAGE Publications on behalf of St Patrick's College, Maynooth
- Frequency: Quarterly

Standard abbreviations
- ISO 4: Ir. Theol. Q.

Indexing
- ISSN: 0021-1400
- LCCN: 82050425
- OCLC no.: 60626549

Links
- Journal homepage; Online access; Online archive

Irish Theological Quarterly is a quarterly peer-reviewed academic journal that publishes systematic, moral, and historical theology as well as sacred scripture. It was established by Walter McDonald and Dr. John Harty in 1906, published by M.H. Gill & Son in Dublin, but ceased publication after his death. A new series was started in 1951. SAGE Publications published it on behalf of St Patrick's College, Maynooth.

== Editors ==
The editor-in-chief since 2024 is Salvador Ryan, professor of ecclesiastical history at St Patrick's Pontifical University, Maynooth. Previous editors have included John Harty, James MacCaffrey, M.J. O'Donnell, Martin O'Callaghan, and Vincent Twomey SVD (1997-2006). Bishop William Philbin for a time, served as a joint-editor of the journal.

== Contributors ==
The Irish Theological Quarterly contributors include Thomas L. Brodie OP, Brian Davies OP, John Navone SJ, Thomas O'Loughlin and Janet E. Smith. Many other theologians, philosophers, and church figures have contributed articles to the journal, including Bishop Thomas Gilmartin, Enda McDonagh and Hugh Pope OP. Review editors are Maynooth lecturers, church historian Professor Salvador Ryan was appointed in 2015 and Liam Tracey OSM.

== Abstracting and indexing ==
The journal is abstracted and indexed in ATLA Religion Database, Scopus, and ZETOC.
