= Hugh Pope =

English Dominican and theologian (1869–1946)

The Very Reverend Hugh Pope OP STM
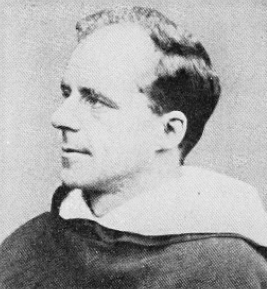
- Born: Henry Vincent Pope; 6 August 1869; Kenilworth, England
- Died: 23 November 1946 (aged 77); Edinburgh, Scotland
- Occupation: Theologian

Henry Vincent Pope (1869–1946), better known as Fr. Hugh Pope, was an English Dominican biblical scholar, Professor of New Testament Exegesis at the Pontificium Collegium Internationale Angelicum, the future Pontifical University of Saint Thomas Aquinas, Angelicum in Rome.

== Early biography ==
Henry Vincent Pope was born at Kenilworth on 6 August 1869, the first son of Richard Vercoe Pope by his second wife, Elizabeth A. Phillips. His father was a convert to Roman Catholicism who taught at the Oratory School in Birmingham.

== Formation ==
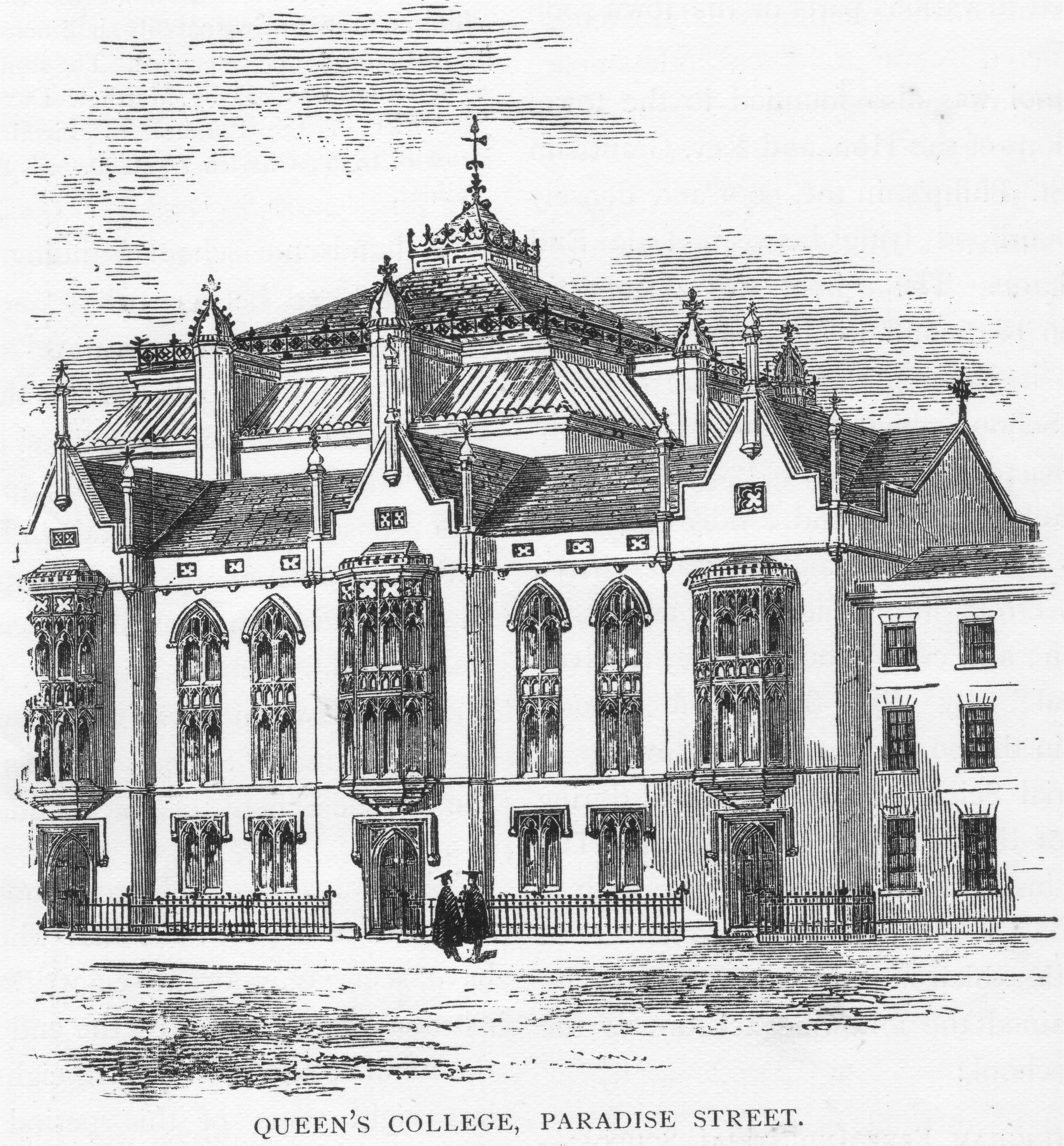
Queen's College, Birmingham, a predecessor college of Birmingham University

Pope was educated at the Oratory School, Birmingham, and at Queen's College, Birmingham (a predecessor college of Birmingham University), where he studied medicine.

Pope entered the Dominican Order at Woodchester 29 September 1891. He studied philosophy at Woodchester until 1894. In 1894 he was transferred to Hawkesyard as a member of the first community there. He was ordained to the priesthood by Bishop Ilsley of Birmingham in September 1896. Pope was sent to Louvain to complete his theological studies becoming a lector in sacred theology there in 1898.

== Career ==
Pope was assigned to Hawkesyard as professor of sacred Scripture in 1898 also serving as librarian. From 1904 to 1907 he was subprior of Hawkesyard. In 1909 he passed the examination in Sacred Scripture before the Biblical Commission in Rome and received a doctorate in sacred theology.

In 1908 Hyacinthe-Marie Cormier, O.P., the 76th Master General of the Order of Preachers appointed Pope professor of New Testament Exegesis at the Pontificium Collegium Internationale Angelicum, the future Pontifical University of Saint Thomas Aquinas, Angelicum in Rome. Cormier created Pope a Master of Sacred Theology in 1911. However, in 1913 Pope was accused of modernism and had to leave Rome. He returned to England. In 1914 he became prior of Woodchester.

=== Woodchester Wayside Cross ===
In 1915 after the deaths in World War I of two parishioners and the Priory's garden boy, who had been adopted by the Dominican Brothers, Father Pope sought to memorialize these men. A Wayside Cross was placed on high ground by the side of the road running by the Priory. The cross came to memorialize not only the fallen residents of the village, but soldiers from South Africa, Australia, Canada and France. Dedicated on 3 June 1917, it was likely the first World War I memorial erected in Britain. On its centennial anniversary the memorial was rededicated, the Princess Royal and other local dignitaries attending.

Pope died in Edinburgh on 23 November 1946. A memorial volume was published as Kieran Mulvey, Hugh Pope of the Order of Preachers (London: Blackfriars Publications, 1954).

== Publications ==
=== Articles and published lectures ===
- "What Are We to Think of Modern Spiritualism?", American Ecclesiastical Review 27(1902), pp. 284–300
- "A Possible View of Romans x 13—21", The Journal of Theological Studies, Vol. 4, No. 14 (January 1903), pp. 273-279
- "The Teaching of the New Testament and of the Church regarding Divorce", The American Catholic Quarterly Review, Vol. XXVIII, 1903.
- "Who was St. Mary Magdalen?", The American Catholic Quarterly Review, Vol. XXIX, 1904.
- "The Condemnation of Four Works by Abbé Loisy", The American Catholic Quarterly Review, Vol. XXIX, 1904..
- "The Influence of the Cuneiform Inscriptions upon Biblical Criticism", American Ecclesiastical Review 29 (1903), pp. 352–363.
- "The Doctrine of the Immaculate Conception of the Mother of God and the Teaching of St. Thomas Aquinas", American Ecclesiastical Review 31 (1904), pp. 566–581.
- "The Formation of a Great Preacher", American Ecclesiastical Review 39 (1908), pp. 140–148; 257-269. (On St Augustine of Hippo.)
- "The Scholastic View of Biblical Inspiration", Irish Theological Quarterly (1911).
- "Why Divorce our Teaching of Theology from our Teaching of the Bible?", in: Irish Theological Quarterly 8 (1913), pp. 47–64.
- "St. Thomas Aquinas as an Interpreter of Holy Scripture". Oxford : Basil Blackwell, 1924. (Lecture)
- 'Isaias: Prophet, Poet, Politician' Studies: An Irish Quarterly Review, Vol. 23, No. 92 (December 1934), pp. 649-663
- "The Apocryphal Books of the New Testament", The New Testament (Papers read at the Summer School of Catholic Studies, held at Cambridge, 31 July to 9 August 1937) London Burns Oates & Washbourne 1938, pp. 242-295.
- "The Origin of the Rheims and Douay Version of the Bible" Studies: An Irish Quarterly Review, Vol. 28, No. 109 (March 1939), pp. 105-114
- "A Brief History of the English Version of the New Testament first published at Rheims in 1582, continued down to the present day", The Library, Transactions of the Bibliographical Society (March 1940), pp. 351–376

=== Pamphlets ===
- Can I stay where I am? An inquiry addressed to "Anglo-Catholics" in doubt. London: Catholic Truth Society, 1911.
- The Godhead of Christ as Portrayed in the Gospels. London: Catholic Truth Society, 1924.
- Why Believe the Bible? London: Catholic Truth Society, 1924.
- The Catholic Doctrine of Indulgences. London: Catholic Truth Society, 1932 (several times reprinted).

=== Books ===
- The Date of the Composition of Deuteronomy: A Critical Study, Rome: F. Pustet, 1910.
- The Catholic Student's "Aids" to the Bible. 3 vols., New York: Benziger Brothers, 1913.
- (translator) The Friar Preacher Yesterday and To-day, London:R & T Washbourne Ltd., 1915.
- The Laymen's New Testament, London: Sheed & Ward, 1927.
- The Catholic Church and the Bible, New York: The Macmillan Company, 1928.
- Saint Augustine of Hippo: Essays Dealing with his Life and Times and some features of his Work. London: Sands, 1937 (several further editions).
- English Versions of the Bible, revised and amplified by Sebastian Bullough. St. Louis: Herder, 1952.

=== Translations and editions ===
- Psalm CXVIII: A Meditation on the Law of God, edited by the Rev. Hugh Pope, O.P. London: Catholic Truth Society, 1901.
- Fifty-two Psalms, Selected from the Psalter, edited with notes by Father Hugh Pope, O.P. London: Catholic Truth Society, 1902.
- On Prayer and the Contemplative Life, by S. Thomas Aquinas; tr. by Hugh Pope, with a preface by Vincent McNabb. London: Washbourne, 1914.
- The Friar Preacher: Yesterday and To-day, translated from the French of Père Jacquin by Hugh Pope. London: Washbourne, 1915.
- A Manual for Dominican Lay-Brothers. Ditchling, Sussex: St. Dominic's Press, 1926.
- The Layman's New Testament, being the Rheims text as first revised by Bishop Challoner, edited with introduction & notes by Hugh Pope. London: Sheed & Ward, 1927 (several times reprinted).
- The Teaching of St. Augustine on Prayer & the Contemplative Life, a translation of various passages from the Saint's sermons and other writings by Father Hugh Pope. London: Burns, Oates & Washbourne ltd, 1935.

== Bibliography ==
- Elias H. Füllenbach: Die Dominikaner zwischen Thomismus und Modernismusverdacht. Die Studienhäuser des Ordens in Europa und ihre Verbindungen, in: Claus Arnold / Johannes Wischmeyer (ed.), Transnationale Dimensionen wissenschaftlicher Theologie, Göttingen 2013 (Veröffentlichungen des Instituts für Europäische Geschichte Mainz, Abteilung für Abendländische Religionsgeschichte, vol. 101), pp. 169-193.
- Kieran Mulvey: Hugh Pope of the Order of Preachers, London 1954.
