= Kairos Communications =

Irish media production and training company

Kairos Communications is a not-for-profit media production and training company based in Maynooth, Co. Kildare, Ireland. It has produced programmes for multiple channels and other clients, and has its own studios.

== History ==
Kairos was set up in 1983 by the Irish branch of the Society of the Divine Word, in Maynooth, Co. Kildare. Fr Michael Melvin SVD, was the founder of Kairos. Kairos (Greek καιρός, "the right time") was the name of a magazine produced by the Divine Word Missionaries for schools, in the 1970s and the Communications company grew out of that. Kairos started producing religious programming for RTE in the 1990s first when it produced the 'Prayer at Bedtime'. In 1990, the Karios Communications Institute, commenced a one-year media course, this developed into a Diploma and Higher Diploma in Christian Communications and Media, accredited by Maynooth.

New studios and facilities for Kairos were officially opened by President Mary McAleese on 11 December 1998.

== Production ==
Kairos produces many programmes with a religious theme for RTÉ Irish Television, including broadcast Sunday Mass and Services, iWitness and The Angelus, as well as documentaries and other programmes for TG4, BBC, EWTN, Trócaire and CURA. Kairos has also produced live European Broadcasts such as the 2017 Christmas Eve mass broadcast by RTÉ and the European Broadcasting Union(EBU). They also produce masses and services on Radio for RTE, broadcast on RTE Radio 1 Extra and Long Wave.

== Education and training ==
Since 2003 Kairos has worked in partnership with Maynooth University (NUI) delivering media production modules for students of degree & masters programmes in media studies. Kairos has 2 studios available for production and for education. Kairos runs post-graduate courses in Christian Communications for St. Patrick's College, Maynooth (Pontifical University). As part of their studies with Maynooth and Kairos, students run a radio station every year during Radio Week. Secondary school students, particularly in transition year, visit the studios and produce, direct and create their own T.V. show on the day, using the Kairos T.V. studio and equipment.

Kairos, with Maynooth University Library, created The Ken Saro-Wiwa Audio-Archive.

== Productions ==
- Every Ancient Every New, produced by Kairos Communications, 1998.
- Faith Hope and Plastic, produced by Kairos Communications Ltd., 2000.
- The Dubliners 40th Birthday Party, at the Gaiety Theatre, Dublin, produced by Kairos Communications Ltd., 2002.
- Know Racism, The National Anti-racism Awareness Programme, produced with RTÉ, for Dept. of Education, 2002.
- Horses In The Blood, produced by Kairos Communications Ltd., 2005.
- As Go Brách Linn, two programmes, produced in association with Ocarina Productions, for Dept. of Education, 2005.
- Osman's Run, (aired on Bebo), produced for Trócaire by Kairos Communications Ltd., 2009.
- A Shadow from the Darkness, Short film for IMU and CORI, produced by Kairos Communications Ltd., 2015.
- An Chaille Bhrídeoige: The Wedding veil of the Prince of Connacht, TG4, produced by Kairos Communications Ltd.
- Strings (Short Film), produced by Kairos Communications Ltd., 2016.
- Mono (2002-2005), presented by Shalini Sinha, produced for RTÉ Diversity by Kairos Communications Ltd.
