= John Chetwode Eustace =

Anglo-Irish Catholic priest and antiquary

Tour through Italy, 1813

John Chetwode Eustace (c. 1762 in Ireland – 1 August 1815 at Naples, Italy) was an Anglo-Irish Catholic priest and antiquary.

== Life ==
His family was English, his mother being one of the Chetwodes of Cheshire. He was educated at Sedgley Park School, and after 1774 at the Benedictine house, St. Gregory's, Douai. He did not become a Benedictine, but he always retained an attachment to the order.

He went to Ireland where he taught rhetoric at Maynooth College, where he was ordained priest. Out of sympathy with Ireland, he returned to England to assist Dr. Collins in his school at Southall Park. From there he went to be chaplain to Sir William Jerningham at Costessey. In 1802 he travelled through Italy with three pupils, John Cust (grandson of John Cust, Lord Brownlow), Robert Rushbroke, and Philip Roche.

During these travels he wrote a journal which subsequently became celebrated in his "Classical Tour". In 1805 he resided in Jesus College, Cambridge, as tutor to George Petre. This was an unusual position for a Catholic priest, and Eustace's intercourse with leading members of the university led to his being charged with indifferentism. John Milner, then vicar Apostolic, charged him with laying aside "the distinctive worship of his priesthood".

When Petre left Cambridge, Eustace accompanied him on another tour to Greece, Sicily, and Malta.

In 1813 the publication of his "Classical Tour" obtained for him sudden celebrity, and he became a prominent figure in literary society. A short tour in France, in 1814, led to his "Letter from Paris", and in 1815 he travelled again to Italy to collect fresh materials, but he was seized with malaria at Naples and died there.

== Works ==
His works were:

- A Political Catechism adapted to the present Moment (1810).
- An Answer to the Charge delivered by the Bishop of Lincoln to the Clergy of that Diocese at the Triennial Visitation in 1812.
- A Tour through Italy, London, J. Mawman, 1813, 1st ed. (1814, 2nd ed.), 2 vols 4to.
- A Classical Tour through Italy, an. MDCCCII, London, J. Mawman, 1815, 3rd ed. revised and enlarged of the previous work, 4 vols 8vo.
- The Proofs of Christianity (1814).
