= James MacCaffrey =

Irish historian, theologian, President of Maynooth College 1918-1935

Monsignor James MacCaffrey STL, PhD

Personal life
- Born: 1875 Fivemiletown, County Tyrone, British Ireland
- Died: 1 November 1935 (aged 59–60) Maynooth, County Kildare, Ireland

Religious life
- Religion: Roman Catholic
- Ordination: 1899

James MacCaffrey (c. 1875 – 1 November 1935) was an Irish Catholic priest, theologian, and historian.

== Biography ==
MacCaffrey was born in 1875, at Fivemiletown, County Tyrone, the son of Francis MacCaffrey of Alderwood, Clogher, County Tyrone. He was educated at St. Macartan's Seminary, Monaghan, before going to St. Patrick's College, Maynooth, and was ordained there in 1899.

He was awarded a Doctorate by the University of Freiburg. At Maynooth, he went on to serve as Professor of Ecclesiastical History from 1901, vice-president (1915–1918), and president of the college from 1918 until 1935.

A noted historian, MacCaffrey edited the early editions of the Historical Journal published in Maynooth Archivium Hibernicum. He served on the editorial board of the Irish Theological Quarterly. MacCaffrey was also Pro-Vice-Chancellor of the National University of Ireland He died on 1 November 1935, while still president of Maynooth.

== Publications ==
- "Louis Veuillot," The Irish Ecclesiastical Record 16 (1904); Part II, Part III, The Irish Ecclesiastical Record 17 (1905)
- The Black Book of Limerick (1906)
- History of the Catholic Church in the Nineteenth-century (1909)
- History of the Catholic Church: From the Renaissance to the French Revolution (1915)
