= Russell Library (St Patrick's College) =

Library in Maynooth, County Kildare, Ireland

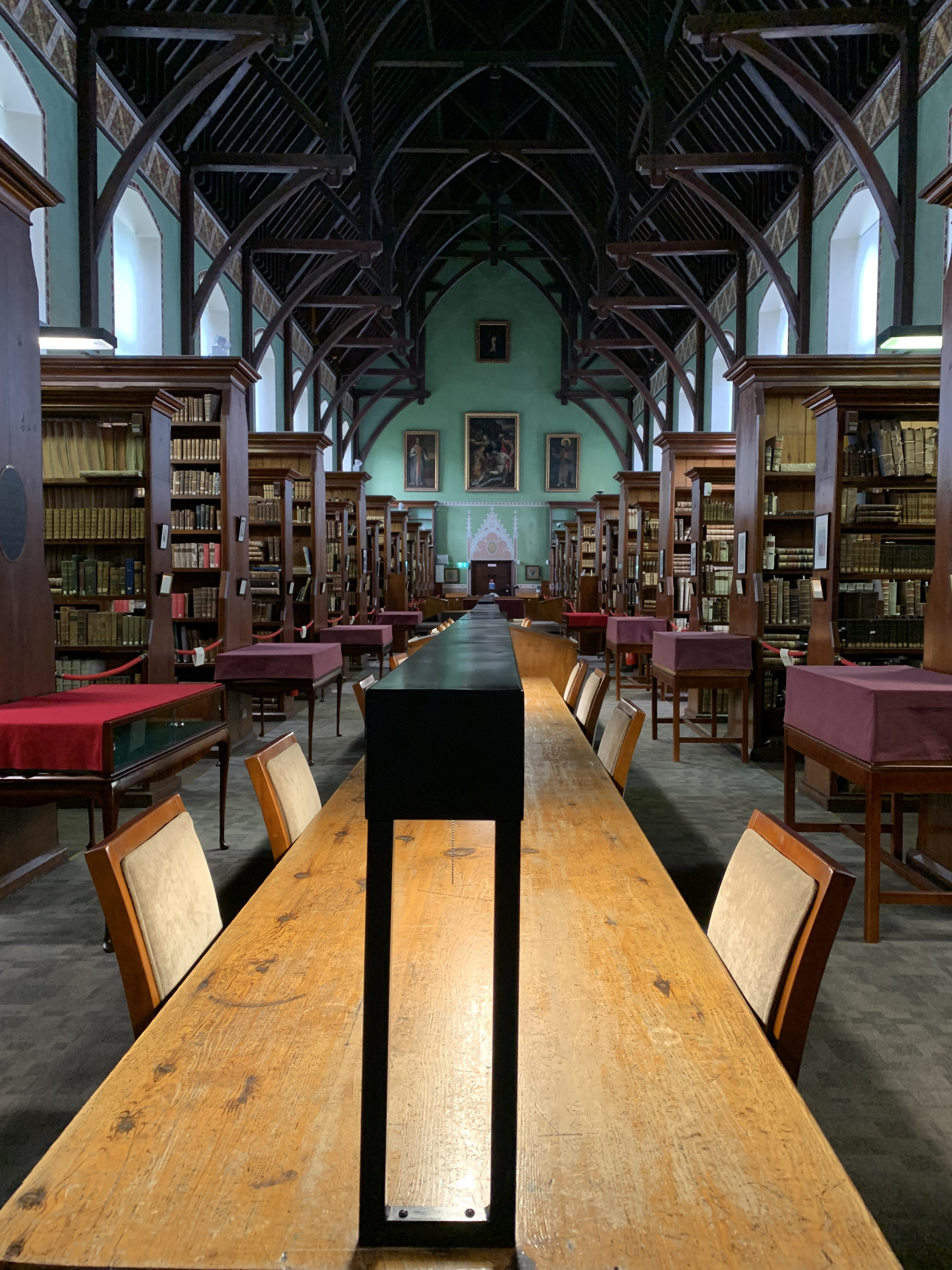
- The Russell Library
- 53.37895377984254°N 6.5974442288345445°W
- Location: Maynooth, Kildare, Ireland
- Type: Academic library
- Established: 1861
- Architect: Augustus Pugin

Collection
- Items collected: Salamanca Archive, Gaelic, Latin, French and English Manuscripts

Access and use
- Access requirements: By appointment

Other information
- Website: www.maynoothuniversity.ie/library/collections/russell-library

The Russell Library (Irish: Leabharlann an Ruiséalaigh) is situated in Maynooth, County Kildare, Ireland on the campus of St Patrick's College, Maynooth. It houses the historical collections of St Patrick's College, which was established in 1795. The Russell Library is home to significant collections, manuscripts, and archival holdings, notably the Salamanca archive documents which date back to 1751. There is also a collection of incunabula (pre-1501 printing) such as a 1482 volume set on moveable type and an illuminated collection of medieval and Gaelic manuscripts. There are over 2,500 bibles, which include 493 long bibles. The Russell Library was the main library in Maynooth until the opening of the John Paul II Library in 1981 which is now the main library for both students of Maynooth University and St Patrick's College. Access to the Russell Library is by appointment only. However, during the summer the library holds exhibitions which are open to the public. The exhibitions typically last from the end of June to the end of July.

== History ==
The Russell library, named after former president and professor at Maynooth College, Charles William Russell, was completed in 1861, taking sixteen years to construct in total. The library was designed by renowned British architect Augustus Welby Northmore Pugin (1812–1852), who did not live to see its completion. Work on the library began in 1845 when the grant received by the college increased dramatically. The President at the time, Lawrence Renehan decided to renovate and expand the colleges library facilities, and opted for the reputed talents of Pugin to realize his vision. The final design included popular contemporary features such as high Gothic windows and an open timbered roof. The library initially served St Patrick's College Maynooth, a seminary for the education of priests, founded in 1795. The entrance hall of the library contains a large stone statue of King George III, a tribute to the man who approved the establishment of St Patrick's college and the library within, in 1795. The Russell library houses the historical collections of St Patrick's College, and also the archives of the Irish college in Salamanca. These archives, numbering some 50,000 documents dating from the foundation of the college in 1592, were relocated to Maynooth college in 1951, following the closure of the Irish college. Maynooth University hosted an exhibition at the Russell library on 18 April 2018, to commemorate the centenary of a protest against compulsory conscription during the second world war. The library, today, serves as a research library for Maynooth University.

== Mathematics collection ==
The mathematics collection of the library includes many rare collections and older printed books. There is information available about items in the collection from the early 19th century and their substantial connection with the teaching of mathematics. In the mathematics collection there is an example of André Darré's Elements of Geometry with both Plane and Spherical Trigonometry (Dublin, 1813). Darré produced the book to help reform the study of mathematics in the college at that time.

== The Salamanca archive ==
From the mid-16th century, due to the anti catholic legislation that restricted the education of Catholics in Ireland, young Irishmen with academic aspirations traveled to continental Europe to begin their education. The Catholics relief acts of 1782 and 1793 finally allowed Catholics to be educated in Ireland, ending the immediate need for Irish colleges abroad. The first Irish college on the continent was established in Paris in 1578, followed by the first Irish college in Salamanca, Spain, in 1592. The Irish college at Salamanca was founded by Rev. Thomas White from Tipperary, Ireland, by royal decree of King Phillip the second, who also provided initial financial support for the students who attended the college. The students resided at the college whilst attending lectures at the University of Salamanca. In 1608 the Irish college was incorporated into the University of Salamanca, and was subsequently administered by the Society of Jesus until their expulsion from Spain in 1767 by King Charles III. The Irish college at Salamanca was closed between 1807 and 1838, due to the peninsula war, and again in 1936 due to the outbreak of the Spanish Civil War. Many records were lost due to damage caused by conflict, and by looting. Those records that escaped undamaged were sent to St Patrick's College, Maynooth, when, after over 360 years, the Irish College at Salamanca closed permanently in 1952. The documents rescued include over 50,000 administrative records, dating as far back as the mid 16th century. They also include some documents from Irish colleges at Lisbon, Valladolid, Seville, Madrid, Alcala de Henares, and Santiago de Compostela. At their height, Irish colleges on the continent numbered 480 students, across twelve locations, most of whom were based in France or the Austrian Netherlands. The Catholic Relief Acts ended the need for foreign education, and led to the establishment of Maynooth college, and the archives were sent here in recognition of the historical links between the need for home based education and the establishment of the college.

== Pamphlets ==
The collection of pamphlets stored in the Russell Library is approximately 12,000 in number showcasing all topics dating from approximately the 18th and 19th centuries made of Irish Language and Catholic Truth Society pamphlets. They display a large range of controversial yet topical issues: political satire, writers reacting to government policy, parliamentary speeches, charity sermons, comic operas, associations for developing as a society, developments in agriculture, inventions, military expedition accounts, medical theories, art exhibitions and finally court cases.

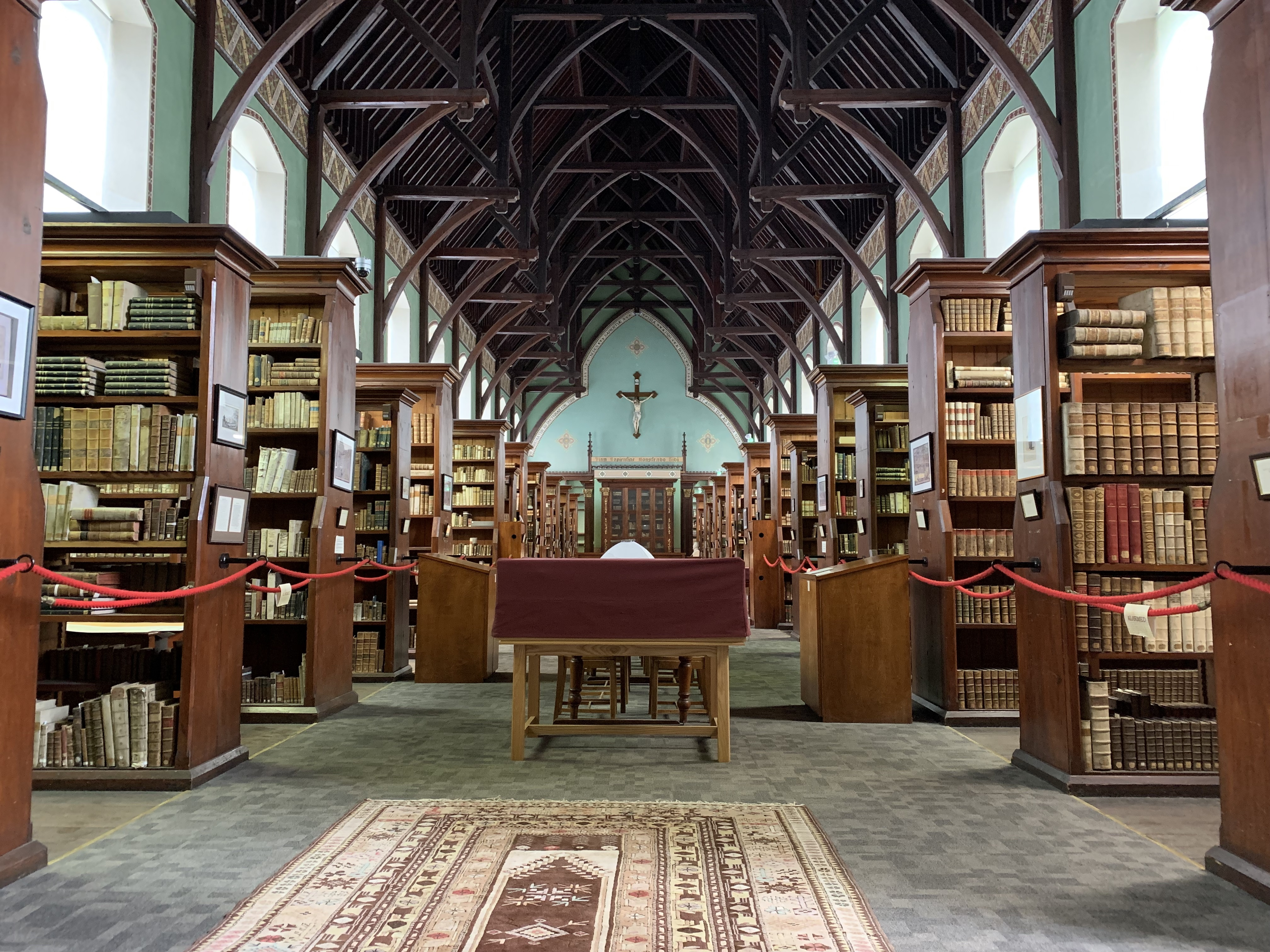
The Russell Library in Maynooth, looking from the east

== See also ==
- List of libraries in the Republic of Ireland
