= St Patrick's Pontifical University, Maynooth =

Catholic college and pontifical university in County Kildare, Ireland

Saint Patrick's Pontifical University, Maynooth
- Coláiste Phádraig, Má Nuad
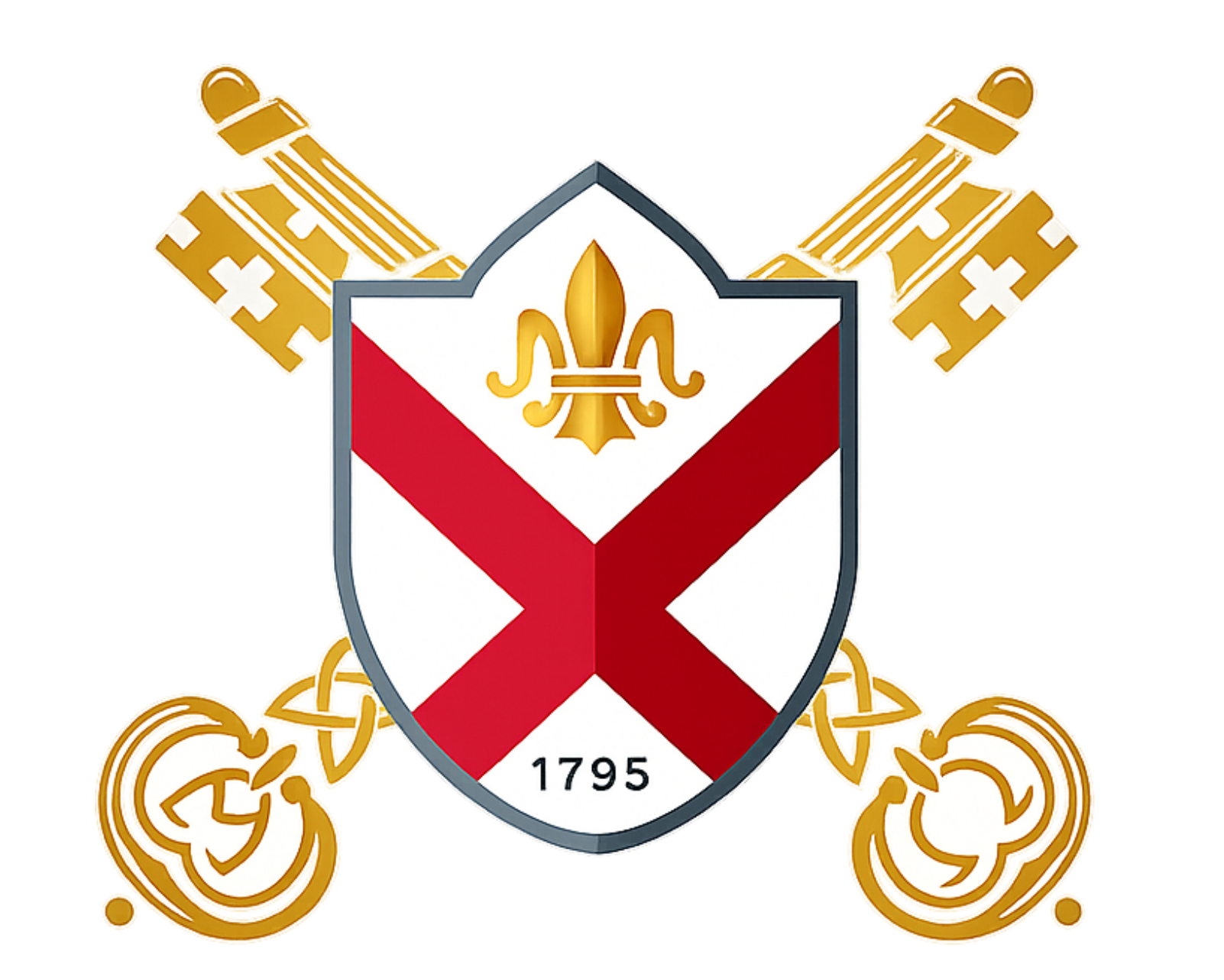
- Latin: Collegium Sancti Patricii apud Manutium
- Other name: Maynooth College
- Former name: Royal College of Saint Patrick Maynooth
- Type: Roman Catholic, private
- Established: 1795; 231 years ago
- Academic affiliations: Maynooth University (1997–present), National University of Ireland (1910–1997), Royal University of Ireland (1882–1909); Catholic University of Ireland (1876–1882), IFCU
- Undergraduates: 360
- Postgraduates: 120
- Doctoral students: 18
- Other students: 620
- Location: Maynooth, Ireland; 53.3804°N 6.5961°W
- Website: sppu.ie

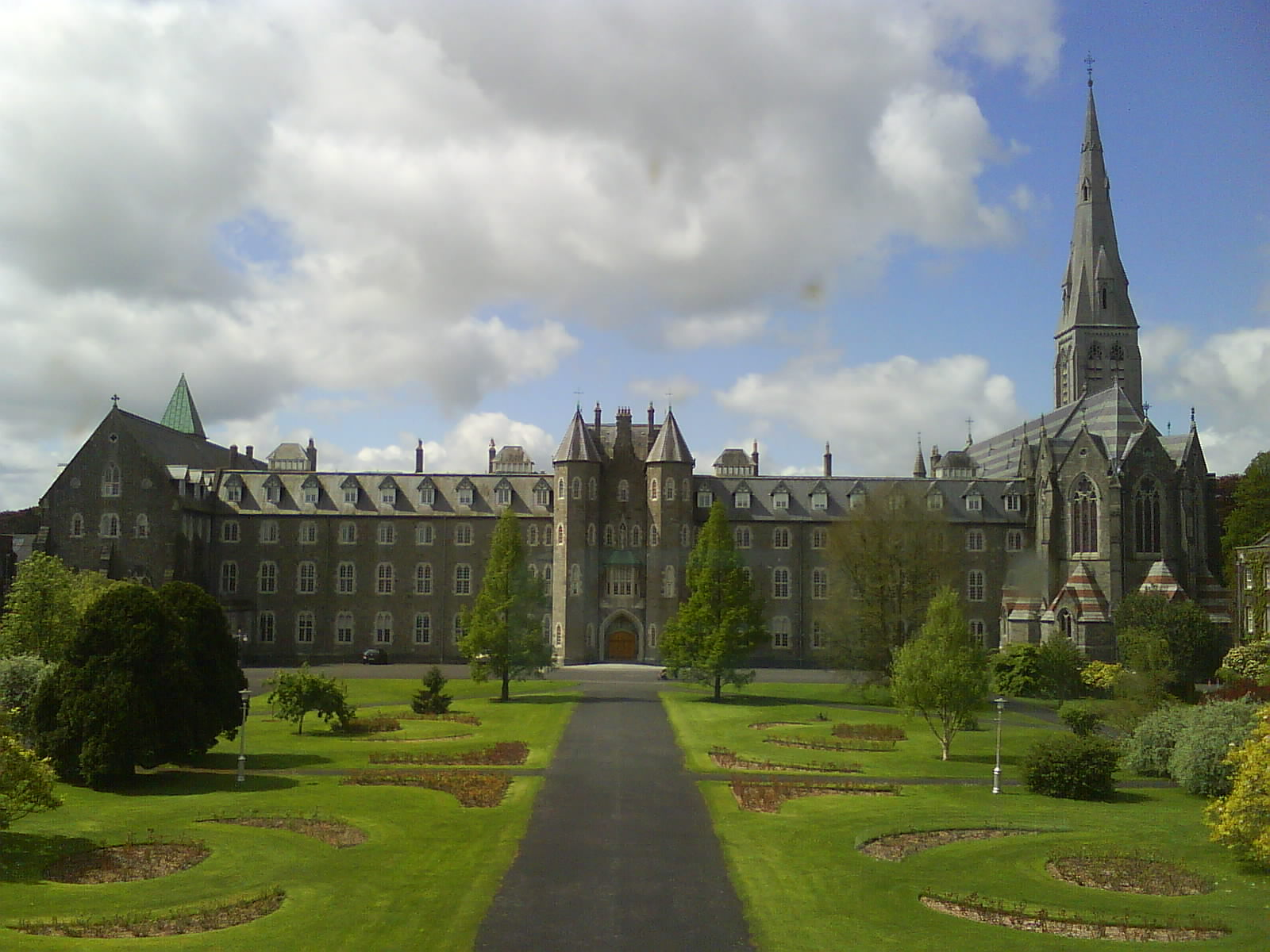
View of St Joseph's Square

St Patrick's Pontifical University, Maynooth (Irish: Coláiste Naoimh Phádraig, Maigh Nuad), is a pontifical Catholic university in the town of Maynooth near Dublin, Ireland. The college and national seminary on its grounds are often referred to as Maynooth College.

The college was officially established as the Royal College of St Patrick by Maynooth College Act 1795. Thomas Pelham, the Chief Secretary for Ireland, introduced a bill for the foundation of a Catholic college, and this was enacted by parliament. It was opened to hold up to 500 students for the Catholic priesthood of whom up to 90 would be ordained each year, and was once the largest seminary in the world.

Degrees are awarded by the Pontifical University at Maynooth, which was established by a pontifical charter of 1896. The pontifical charter entitles the university to grant degrees in canon law, philosophy and theology.

The college is associated with the state-run Maynooth University, with which it shares an historic campus, as well as certain facilities.

== History ==
=== 16th century foundation ===
The town of Maynooth, County Kildare, was the seat of the Fitzgeralds, Earls of Kildare. The ivy-covered tower attached to St Mary's Church of Ireland is all that remains of the ancient college of St Mary of Maynooth, founded and endowed by Gerald, 8th Earl of Kildare, and dedicated to the Blessed Virgin Mary. On 7 October 1515 Henry VIII granted licence for the establishment of a college. In 1518, the 9th Earl presented a petition to the Archbishop of Dublin, William Rokeby, for a license to found and endow a college at Maynooth: the College of the Blessed Virgin Mary. In 1535 the college was suppressed and its endowments and lands confiscated as part of the Reformation.

=== 1795 re-establishment ===
The present college was created in the 1790s against the background of the upheaval during the French Revolution and the gradual removal of the penal laws. The college was particularly intended to provide for the education of Catholic priests in Ireland, who until this Act had to go to continental Europe for their formation and theological education. Many were educated in France, and the church and government were concerned at the Dechristianization of France during the French Revolution, and at the same time at the risk of revolutionary thinking arising from training in revolutionary France (with whom Britain was at war). A number of the early lecturers in Maynooth, were exiles from France (such as sometimes called the French founding fathers, Professors Francois Anglade, André Darré, Louis-Gilles Delahogue, and Pierre-Justin Delort), also among the first professors was a layman James Bernard Clinch recommended by Edmund Burke. Also relevant was the enactment of the Roman Catholic Relief Act 1793.

The college was legally established on 5 June 1795 by the Maynooth College Act 1795 as The Royal College of St Patrick, by act of the Parliament of Ireland, to provide "for the better education of persons professing the popish or Roman Catholic religion". The college was originally established to provide a university education for Catholic lay and ecclesiastical students, the lay college was based in Riverstown House on the south campus from 1802. With the opening of Clongowes Wood in 1814, the lay college (which had lay trustees) was closed and the college functioned solely as a Catholic seminary for almost 150 years.

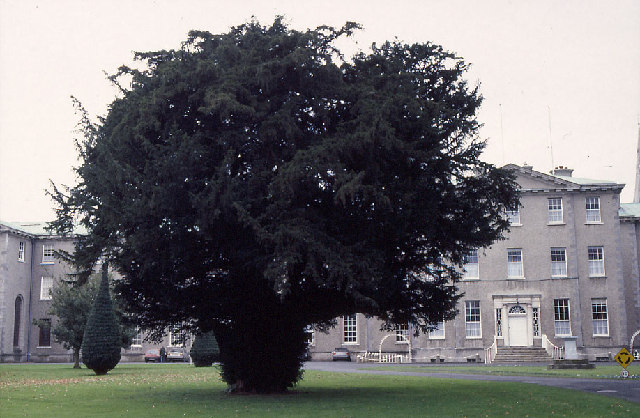
Ireland's oldest tree, the Silken Thomas Yew, is 700–800 years old.

In 1800, John Butler, 12th Baron Dunboyne, died and left a substantial fortune to the college. Butler had been a Roman Catholic, and Bishop of Cork, who had embraced Protestantism in order to marry and guarantee the succession to his hereditary title. However, there were no children to his marriage and it was alleged that he had been reconciled to the Catholic Church at his death. Were this the case, a Penal Law demanded that the will was invalid and his wealth would pass to his family. Much litigation followed before a negotiated settlement in 1808 that led to the establishment of a Dunboyne scholarship fund.

The land was donated by William FitzGerald, 2nd Duke of Leinster, who had argued in favour of Catholic Emancipation in the Irish House of Lords. He lived nearby at Carton and also at Leinster House. The building work was paid for by the British Government; parliament continued to give it an annual grant until the Irish Church Act 1869. When this law was passed the college received a capital sum of £369,000. The trustees invested 75% of this in mortgages to Irish landowners at a yield of 4.25% or 4.75% per annum. This would have been considered a secure investment at that time but agitation for land reform and the depression of the 1870s eroded this security. The largest single mortgage was granted to the Earl of Granard. Accumulated losses on these transactions reached £35,000 by 1906.

The first building to go up on this site was designed by, and named after, John Stoyte; Stoyte House, which can still be seen from the entrance to the old campus, is a well-known building to Maynooth students and stands very close to the very historic Maynooth Castle. Over the next 15 years, the site at Maynooth underwent rapid construction so as to cater for the influx of new students, and the buildings which now border St Joseph's Square (to the rear of Stoyte House) were completed by 1824.

The Rev. Laurence F. Renehan (1797–1857), a noted antiquarian, church historian, and cleric, served as president of St Patrick's from 1845 until 1857. Under Renehan, many of the college's most important buildings were constructed by Augustus Pugin.

=== Maynooth Grant ===
Following the controversy regarding the Maynooth Grant, the college received a higher annual grant from the British Government, as well as a sum for repairs. In 1845, the British government under Robert Peel increased the annual grant to Maynooth College from £9,000 to £26,000, and provided a capital grant of £30,000 for building extensions again. However this was controversial as Roman Catholics saw it as a bribe, while most Protestants were not in favour of the government funding Roman Catholic education. For example, the Anti-Maynooth Conference was hosted in London in May 1845 by Conservatives, evangelical Anglicans and the Protestant Association to campaign against the Maynooth Grant.

=== Oath of Allegiance ===
As part of the Act on which Maynooth College was founded, students and trustees of the college were expected to take an Oath of Allegiance to the Crown. Some clerical students did not attend since they objected to pledging allegiance to the head of the Anglican church.

=== Michael O'Hickey ===
In 1909, Irish language activist and scholar Micheál Pádraig Ó hIcí (1860–1916) was dismissed from his position as Professor of Irish for his conduct in the controversy over Irish as a matriculation subject for the new National University of Ireland. He was supported by such Maynooth figures as the college president, Daniel Mannix, and the Professor of Theology, Walter McDonald (1854–1920).

In An Linn Bhuí, the Irish-language journal of Co Waterford, O'Hickey's home county, Mícheál Briody, lecturer at the Languages Centre, Helsinki University, Finland, says that O'Hickey was a prominent member of the Gaelic League and fiercely in favour of compulsory Irish for the new University of Ireland, whereas Mannix, then President of St Patrick's College, Maynooth, together with most of the Catholic bishops, was opposed. This was the cause of O'Hickey's sacking. Briody says that the senate of the new university, one year after O'Hickey's sacking, agreed to Irish being compulsory for matriculation and not long after that Mannix was posted as the Archbishop of Melbourne in Australia against his own will. Mannix, however, later became a strong supporter of Irish republicanism and something of a thorn in the side of the authorities both ecclesiastical and civil, in Australia as well as Britain.

=== Expansion ===
In 1876 the college became a constituent college of the Catholic University of Ireland, and later offered Royal University of Ireland degrees in arts and science. Even after the granting of the Pontifical Charter in 1896 the college became a recognised college of the National University of Ireland in 1910, and from this time its arts and science degrees were awarded by the National University of Ireland. However, during this time the Pontifical University of Maynooth continued to confer its degrees in theology, because until 1997 theology degrees were prohibited by the Royal University of Ireland and its successor the National University of Ireland.

=== Lay entry ===
In 1966 after a gap of nearly 150 years lay students again entered the college, these being the members of lay religious institutes, and in 1968 all laity were accepted; by 1977 they outnumbered religious students.

=== Separation of NUI Maynooth / Maynooth University ===
In 1997 the Universities Act, 1997 was passed by the Oireachtas. Chapter IX of the Act provided for the creation of the separate Maynooth University. This new university was created from the college's faculties of Arts, Celtic Studies and Philosophy, and Science.

In 1994, W. J. Smyth had been appointed to the position of Master of St Patrick's College Maynooth (NUI). In 1997 this position was converted into President of MU. After his 10-year term ended in 2004, he was replaced by John Hughes as president of Maynooth University and a new line of heads for the college.

=== Seminary in 21st century ===
By 2016, the number of resident seminarians dropped from several hundreds to just 40 to 60. In August 2016 it was revealed that, due to frequent use of Grindr by college students, the then Archbishop of Dublin Diarmuid Martin decided to transfer the students from his diocese to the Irish Pontifical College in Rome. According to Martin, "there are allegations on different sides", one of which of an "atmosphere that was growing in Maynooth" of a "homosexual, a gay culture, that students have been using an app called Grindr", which "would be fostering promiscuous sexuality, which is certainly not in any way the mature vision of sexuality one would expect a priest to understand".

Subsequently, the college trustees had ordered a review of the college's policy on social media use.

=== Timeline ===
- 1518 – Garret Óg Fitzgerald, Earl of Kildare, founded the College of St Mary, in Maynooth
- 1535 – College of St. Mary confiscated as part of Henry VIII's religious policies
- 1795 – The Royal College of St Patrick established on 5 June 1795
- 1800 – Act of Union 1800 results in the transfer of Maynooth grant from Dublin to London
- 1808 – Dunboyne Establishment case settled between the Maynooth Trustees and Butler family
- 1817 - Maynooth College Cemetery opened
- 1869–71 – Disestablishment of the Church of Ireland by the British parliament (promoted by Gladstone), Maynooth was disendowed, and the lay trustees left the board.
- 1875 – Second National Synod held in Maynooth
- 1876 – Maynooth became a constituent college of the Catholic University of Ireland
- 1891 – College Chapel built by J. J. McCarthy opened
- 1896 – Maynooth granted pontifical university status by Papal Charter from Pope Leo XIII
- 1910 – St. Patrick's College, Maynooth officially became a recognised college of the National University of Ireland
- 1911 – Coronation Visit of King George V to the Royal College of St Patrick, Maynooth
- 1918 – Maynooth Mission to China founded
- 1979 – Visit of Pope John Paul II
- 1981 – Publication of An Bíobla Naofa, the first complete Irish Language version of The Bible
- 1996 – National Centre for Liturgy moves to Maynooth from Carlow College.
- 1997 – Maynooth University founded from the faculties of Science, Arts and Celtic studies, with the faculties of Philosophy, Canon Law and Theology remaining as St. Patrick's College, degrees awarded by the Pontifical University.

== Student activities and alumni ==
Maynooth Students' Union represents students of St Patrick's College, Maynooth and NUI Maynooth.

The Maynooth Union was founded in 1895 during the centenary and the constitution agreed in 1896, to "foster a spirit of mutual sympathy between the College and its past students and friends", it hosts an annual reunion. Maynooth Alumni Association provides graduates of the St. Patrick's College, Maynooth and NUI Maynooth, with a channel to keep in touch with their alma mater as well as with friends and classmates from their time in Maynooth it is based in Riverstown Lodge on the south campus.

In 1972 Maynooth entered the Gaelic Football Sigerson Cup for the first time and won it in 1976. They also participate in the Hurling competition, the Fitzgibbon Cup and won it in 1973 and 1974.

== Emblem ==
St. Patrick's Flag is used as the emblem of the college, and the flag has flown above Stoyte House, a new logo was used for the buildup and since the bicentennial of the college based on the Gothic buildings. The St. Patrick's flag is on the coat of arms of the Duke of Leinster who donated the land for Maynooth College. The St. Patrick's flag is also contained in the logo of St. Patrick's Pontifical University Maynooth, the Maynooth logo, with the papal keys symbol behind it.

== Governance ==
From its foundation 1795 Maynooth had been governed by a board of clerical (long-serving Catholic bishops of Ireland) and lay trustees appointed by the government. The lay trustees were prominent Catholic Lords, such as the Earl of Fingall Arthur James Plunkett and the Lord Chancellor of Ireland. One of the side effects of the act to disestablish the Church of Ireland, was that Maynooth's governance and funding changed, leaving only the Bishops on the board of trustees.(Vic., C.25)

== Buildings ==
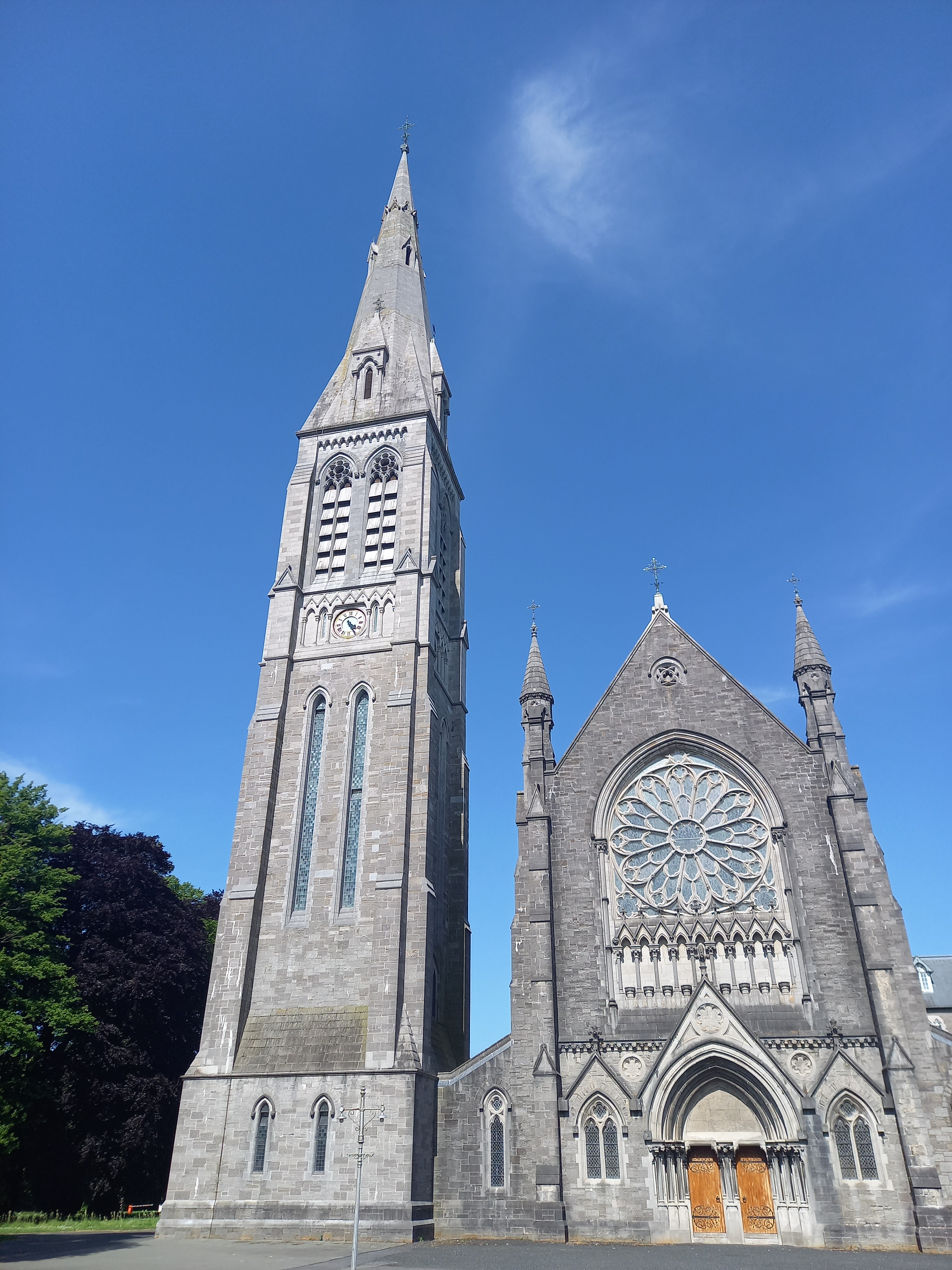
St Patricks's Collegiate Chapel, Maynooth, 2023

The historic buildings of Maynooth.

- Stoyte House – dating from 1780, originally the home of the steward of the Leinster estate.
- College Chapel - arguably the most precious building of all on the entire campus, the foundation stone was laid in 1875 and it was opened for worship in 1891 in preparation for the college's first centenary.
- St. Joseph's Square – the square is laid out as a formal garden. The eastern side of the square contains Callan Hall and Physics Hall.
- Dunboyne House – South wing of St. Joseph's Square.
- Humanity House – Extension to Dunboyne completing south wing of St. Joseph's Square.
- New House – North wing of St. Joseph's Square, completed in 1809 and rebuilt after being burnt down in the 1940s.
- St. Mary's Square
- St. Mary's
- St. Patrick's
- Russell Library – designed by Augustus Welby Pugin and completed in 1861.
- Pugin Hall
- Aula Maxima – opened in 1893, was the gift to his alma mater of the Right Rev. Mgr. James McMahon of The Catholic University of America in Washington, D.C.
- Riverstown House – used by the lay college from 1801 to 1817. Now Alumni office for both St. Patrick's College, and MU.
- Logic House – Mathematics and Music Departments (MU).
- Rhetoric House – History, Geography and Economics Departments (MU).
- Loftus Halls – Examination halls.
- Senior Infirmary/Columba Centre – designed in the early 1860s by JJ McCarthy is today used as office space by Irish Bishops' Conference, Accord and CURA.
- Staff Dining Hall
- Museum – The museum houses many beautiful ecclesiastical and scientific artifacts.
- John Paul II Library – was opened in 1983, extension completed in 2012.
- St Mary's (Church of Ireland) – was the chapel for the Fitzgeralds, later incorporated into the outer wall of the college.

=== Library ===
Prior to the establishment of the college, students for the diocesan priesthood had to travel to the European mainland, to one of the many Irish colleges based principally in France, Spain, and the Low Countries. The continental background of early members of staff, some of whom were native French refugees from the French Revolution, is reflected in the Library's holdings. A large proportion of the 22,000 pre-1850 books were published abroad. Several professors and eminent churchmen were great collectors, and their collections ultimately came to the Library. At the beginning, the Library was small and there were no text books for the students. Many professors decided to go into print and to write their own, having their students subscribe in advance. Printing by subscription was a common practice and the subscription lists still show the names of students and staff from this early period in the college's history.

When the annual grant received by the college was increased threefold in 1845, the president at the time, Laurence Renehan, started much needed renovations. Augustus Welby Pugin was brought in to design new buildings, which included a library with high gothic windows and an open timbered roof, completed in 1861. The tall wooden stacks and long center tables hardly changed for over a century, and daylight was considered sufficient to work by until 1970, when electric lighting was finally introduced. It now houses the pre-1850 books and manuscripts and is known as the Russell Library. It is home to a fine collection of Gaelic manuscripts, as well as non-Gaelic manuscripts that are largely the literary contributions of staff and students. When the last Irish college in Spain (Salamanca) closed in 1951, the archives were transferred to Maynooth. These included documents from other Irish colleges (Alcalá, Santiago, and Seville) and administrative records dating back to the end of the sixteenth century. The Russell Library housed two-thirds of the book stock and most readers until 1984.

Prior to October 1984, the Library of Maynooth College occupied eight locations. Two of these had been principal locations: the Main Library, located in the building complex built by Pugin for the Seminary in the mid-nineteenth century, and the New Arts Library in the new campus, created in the middle of the twentieth century. A shortage of space in the Library and the lack of modern facilities led the college and its then President Monsignor Olden to build a new library from donations in Ireland and abroad, mainly the United States. The foundation stone of the new building was blessed by Pope John Paul II during his visit to Ireland in 1979 and in 1983 the John Paul II Library opened its doors. The former eight locations were reduced to three: the old "Main Library" became, in 1984, the Russell Library for old and rare books and manuscripts, the new John Paul II Library became the main working academic library, and a separate Chemistry Store for a surfeit of chemistry periodicals. In November 2010, the construction of an extension to the existing library began, which opened in 2012. It incorporated the former Chemistry Store, thus reducing the library locations to two.

=== National Science Museum and Museum of Ecclesiology ===
The museum in Maynooth College established in 1934 contains many items from the college's history, including ecclesiastical artifacts and scientific apparatus such as that of the physicist Nicholas Callan. Nicholas Callan figure in the study of electromagnetism, inventing the induction coil and Maynooth Battery. Callan is buried in the college grounds. Apparatus associated with telegraphy, notably items used by Marconi are also stored in the Museum.

== Presidents of Maynooth College ==
- Reverend Thomas Hussey F.R.S. (25 June 1795)
- Reverend Peter Flood (17 January 1798)
- Reverend Andrew Dunne (24 February 1803)
- Reverend Patrick Byrne (27 June 1807)
- Reverend Patrick Everard (29 June 1810)
- Most Reverend Daniel Murray (Coadjutor Archbishop of Dublin) (29 June 1812)
- Reverend Bartholomew Crotty (13 November 1813)
- Reverend Michael Slattery (19 June 1832)
- Reverend Michael Montague (25 June 1834)
- Reverend Laurence Renehan (25 June 1845)
- Reverend Charles W. Russell (20 October 1857)
- Reverend William J Walsh (22 June 1880)
- Reverend Robert Browne (7 October 1885)
- Rt Reverend Monsignor Denis Gargan (9 October 1894)
- Reverend Daniel Mannix (13 October 1903)
- Rt Reverend John F Hogan (8 October 1912)
- Rt Reverend Monsignor James MacCaffrey (8 October 1918)
- Rt Reverend Monsignor John D'Alton (23 June 1936)
- Rt Reverend Monsignor Edward Kissane PA (23 June 1942)
- Rt Reverend Monsignor Gerard Mitchell (23 June 1959)
- Rt Reverend Monsignor Patrick Corish (23 November 1967)
- Rt Reverend Monsignor Jeremiah Newman (8 October 1968)
- Rt Reverend Monsignor Tomás Ó Fiaich (12 June 1974)
- Rt Reverend Monsignor Michael Olden (26 September 1977)
- Rt Reverend Monsignor Micheál Ledwith (13 March 1985)
- Rt Reverend Monsignor Matthew O'Donnell (22 June 1994)
- Rt Reverend Monsignor Dermot Farrell (9 December 1996)
- Rt Reverend Monsignor Hugh Connolly (1 September 2007)
- Reverend Michael Mullaney (1 September 2017)
- Reverend Michael Shortall (10 October 2024)

== People ==
The University has a wealth of illustrious alumni. For a comprehensive list, see: Alumni of St Patrick's Pontifical University, Maynooth

== Today ==
Any student of the college, prior to the passing of the Universities Act, 1997, upon whom a degree of the National University of Ireland was conferred is now legally considered to be a graduate of Maynooth University. The college continues to share its campus with the National University of Ireland, but Maynooth remains a separate legal entity with training in canon law, philosophy and theology and awards the degrees of the Pontifical University and is associated with several other colleges. Pontifical University BA undergraduate students can take their degree in Theology along with an Arts subject from the National University. BA in Theology and BA in Theology with Arts is available on the CAO system.

Students who graduate from MU in philosophy can on submission of a subsequent different thesis can be conferred with a B.Phil. by the Pontifical University.

The Postgraduate Diploma in Christian Communications and Media Practice is provided by the college, in conjunction with Kairos Communications in Maynooth, where classes and training on the course take place.

Since October 2011, all academic awards from the Pontifical University of Maynooth have been aligned to the Irish National Framework of Qualifications by the NQAI.

As part of the Erasmus university exchange programme, Saint Patrick's College, Maynooth has bilateral agreements with Faculties of Theology in Belgium, Czech Republic, Finland, France, Germany, Malta, Portugal, Slovakia, Spain (Salamanca) and Switzerland (Freiburg).

In 2014–2015, the college had 69 resident seminarians and a significant number of non-resident seminarians travelling in by day for lectures. A further five Irish seminarians were studying in St. Malachy's Seminary in Belfast (the only other Catholic seminary in Ireland until its closure in 2018) and maintained close links with their counterparts in Maynooth. There are approximately 80 post-graduate students of theology and 250 undergraduate philosophy and theology students who are registered as full-time students of the college.

Following Froebel College of Education's move to Maynooth in 2013, and continuing its ethos and heritage, Religious Education and Theology modules are delivered by the Froebel Department of Early Childhood and Primary Education(NUIM) and St. Patrick's College, Maynooth's, Faculty of Theology, running alongside the Degree and Masters programmes, leading to a Certificate awarded by Maynooth and qualifying to teach in Catholic Schools.

Seminarians from Redemptoris Mater Seminary study philosophy and theology in Maynooth, since its formation in 2012.

In 2013, a new Diploma in Catholic Education (DCE) was offered to students, in association with Maynooth University's Department of Education and the University of Notre Dame, 2014 saw the Diploma being delivered in St. Kieran's College, Kilkenny, and 2019 seen the diploma being offered in Cork by the Christian Leadership in Education Office (CLEO).

The Shekinah Certificate and Diploma Spirituality - Applied Youth Ministry and Facilitation, delivered online and blended learning, is accredited by Maynooth, the programmes evolved out of the Salesian, Shekinah Youth Retreat Training Course which commenced in 2005, and these programmes before 2016 were run with and awarded by All Hallows College, Dublin.

In 2022, a new Diploma in Spirituality and Youth Ministry and Spirituality programme commenced in partnership with Salesian Ireland.

Since September 2019, Maynooth College has run a Higher Diploma in Healthcare Chaplaincy.

=== Affiliated programmes ===
Up to 120 further students are registered on courses validated by the college including permanent diaconate programmes and partnership programmes with the National Liturgy Institute, St. Patrick's College, Thurles, Accord, Kairos Communications and others. The Diploma in Spirituality is run at the Manresa Jesuit Centre of Spirituality in Dublin.

St. Patrick's College, Maynooth accredits a number of certificate courses at the MU Kilkenny Campus at St. Kieran's College, 2011 saw the commencement of a Certificate in Theological Studies in association with the Catholic Diocese of Ossory. Since 2010 at the Kilkenny campus a Certificate in Christian Studies for lay Anglicans, in association with the Church of Ireland Diocese of Cashel and Ossory has also been accredited. In 2018 the Certificate in Christian Studies was run in the Anglican Diocese of Cork, Ross and Cloyne. St. Patrick's College, Maynooth also teaches the Theology modules in St. Kieran's as part of the NUIM BA programme, and can progress to a BA Th from the Pontifical University.

Since 2015, Maynooth (Pontifical University) also accredits an undergraduate BTh degree and postgraduate MTh degree in Carmelite Studies for the Carmelite Institute of Britain and Ireland.

In September 2017, Maynooth began offering a joint distance learning Licentiate in Canon Law (JCL) and joint civil masters in canon law with Saint Paul University, Ottawa, Canada.

A two-year Certificate in Theology, Adult Education and Pastoral Ministry (THAEPM), commenced in 2019 in Dundalk and Armagh and is run in partnership with the Archdiocese of Armagh and the college.

Maynooth validates the Diploma in Pastoral Theology run in association with the Roman Catholic Diocese of Derry, and the Drumalis Retreat Centre, in Larne.

Maynooth also supports the Tarsus Scripture School.

==== Former Affiliated Programmes ====
- Dominican Biblical Institute, Limerick (2000–2015), closure.
- Holy Ghost Missionary College (Kimmage Manor), Dublin, in the 1980s, Maynooth award a BD to graduates.
- Maryvale Institute, Birmingham (1980–2015), programmes replaced by Faculté de Notre Dame, Paris programmes
- Mater Dei Institute of Education (1966–1999), validated agreement with Dublin City University
- Scotus College, Glasgow (1993–2009), college closed.
- St. Patrick's College, Thurles (1973–2002), seminary ceased, transferred to Maynooth.

=== Aspal ===
Aspal (called and sent) is a collaboration between the Pontifical University and the Adult Faith Development Team in the Diocese of Ossory, and based in St. Kieran's College, Kilkenny, to provide a digital platform for faith formation, launched in 2021. It is supported by the Benefact Trust, and provides a number of free and paid courses online and via a mobile phone app. Aimed at both groups and individuals Aspal provides courses in Parish Administration, Ministers of the Word and Eucharist, and pathways to ministry.

=== Annual events ===
The graduation ceremony for the conferral of Pontifical University degrees normally takes place on the first Saturday after the October Reading Week each year in the college chapel.

One of the major events in the college calendar is the annual Christmas carol service in the college chapel. Started in 1969, this is a now a joint event between the two universities and seminary.

Every year open days are held in conjunction with Maynooth University, when students can view the facilities of the common campus, student services and see what courses are available at both institutions.

=== Public lectures ===
The college hosts a number of public lectures, often with international speakers invited, The Michael Devlin Lecture, The Trocaire Lecture (in association with Trocaire), The Newman Lecture (after John Henry Newman; in association with NUIM and An Foras Feasa), Thomas Gilmartin Lecture, and The Corish Lecture.

== Publications ==
- Archivium Hibernicum : founded in 1911; annual historical journal published by St. Patrick's College and the Department of Modern History, National University of Ireland Maynooth
- The Bridge: biannual magazine for Maynooth and NUIM alumni
- The Furrow : founded in 1950; a monthly journal for the contemporary Church
- Irish Theological Quarterly: quarterly journal of theology, and scripture
- Irish Ecclesiastical Record, a monthly journal, was published from 1880 until 1968 from Maynooth
- Kalendarium: the annual publication of Maynooth College for the Seminary and Pontifical University
- Maynooth Theological Journal (MTJ): biannual journal of theological studies, founded in 2010
- Intercom: a pastoral and liturgical resource magazine published by Veritas, edited by Fr. Chris Hayden, Catholic Communications office, Maynooth.

== See also ==
- Alumni of St Patrick's Pontifical University, Maynooth
- Education in the Republic of Ireland
- List of universities in the Republic of Ireland
