= Edward Kissane =

Irish priest and academic, President of Maynooth College 1942-1959

Edward J. Kissane (1886–1959) was an Irish priest, biblical scholar and President of St Patrick's College, Maynooth

== Early life and education ==
Born in Killomeroe, Lisselton, County Kerry, he was educated at St Michael's College, Listowel and St. Brendan's College, Killarney before entering Maynooth in 1903. He was ordained a priest in 1910 before pursuing further study in the (then) newly established) Biblical Institute in Rome, where he was awarded the degree of L.S.S. He travelled to the Holy Land pursuing his Old Testament studies, and was much published on the subject. In 1913 Dr. Kissane took up a post at St. Augustine's Seminary, Toronto, Canada, as Professor of Sacred Scripture.

== Staff of Maynooth College ==
In 1917 he returned to Ireland to take up the post of Professor of Sacred Scripture and Oriental Languages in St. Patrick's College, Maynooth.

Kissane was appointed vice-president of Maynooth College in 1941 in succession to Canon P O'Neill who had been made Parish Priest of Bruff, County Limerick.

== College President ==
In June 1942 he became the College president when John D'Alton was appointed Bishop of Meath and in 1945 was appointed Domestic Prelate by Pope Pius XII. He was further honoured in June 1953 when he was appointed a Protonotary Apostolic, the highest college of prelates in the Roman curia.

Elected to the Royal Irish Academy in 1942, Monsignor Kissane was appointed pro-vice chancellor of the National University of Ireland in 1949.

He represented Ireland on KLM's inaugural flight from Amsterdam over the North Pole to Japan in November 1958.

He died in a nursing home in February 1959, and was succeeded by Monsignor Gerard Mitchell from the Archdiocese of Tuam.

== Publications ==
- Book of Job by Rev. Edward J. Kissane, D.D., L.S.S., Browne and Nolan Ltd, 1939.
- Book of Psalms by Rev. Edward J. Kissane, D.D., L.S.S., Browne and Nolan Ltd, 1954.
- Book of Issiah by Rev. Edward J. Kissane, D.D., L.S.S., Browne and Nolan Ltd, 1941.
