= Michael Montague (priest) =

Irish Catholic priest, President of Maynooth College 1834-1854

Rev. Michael Montague (1773–1845) was an Irish Roman Catholic priest and educator, from the parish of Errigal-Kiernan in County Tyrone. He was educated for the priesthood first at Clare Castle Seminary, Tandragee, County Armagh, and then at St. Patrick's College, Maynooth, County Kildare, where he was to spend his adult life. He was a student at Maynooth from the college's opening in November 1795. He was ordained deacon for the Armagh Archdiocese by Archbishop O'Reilly, ordained priest by the president of the college at Maynooth, Dr. Peter Flood, and encouraged to take up a position in the college. He served as bursar and vice-president from 1816, and was elevated to president in 1834, the first Maynooth educated President of the College. He resigned the office of president in 1845 due to ill health, and died in October that year.
